= Burial places of Portuguese royalty =

These burial places of Portuguese royalty record the known graves of monarchs who have reigned in Portugal, as well as members of their royal families.

== Monarchs of Portugal (since 1139) ==
Name	Death	Place of burial	Image
Afonso I	1185	Monastery of the Holy Cross, Coimbra	
Sancho I	1211	Monastery of the Holy Cross, Coimbra	
Afonso II	1223	Alcobaça Monastery	
Sancho II	1247	Toledo Cathedral, Toledo, Spain; The exact location of his burial is unknown.	
Afonso III	1279	Alcobaça Monastery; Initially buried in the Convent of Saint Dominic, in Lisbon.	
Denis I	1325	Monastery of Saint Denis, Odivelas	
Afonso IV	1357	Lisbon Cathedral	
Peter I	1367	Alcobaça Monastery	
Ferdinand I	1383	Convent of Carmo, Lisbon; Initially buried in the Convent of Saint Francis, in Santarém. His remains were lost during the French Invasions.	
Beatrice (disputed)	c. 1420	Monastery of Sanctu Spiritus, Toro, Spain	
John I	1433	Batalha Monastery (Founders' Chapel)	
Edward I	1438	Batalha Monastery (Unfinished Chapels)	
Afonso V	1481	Batalha Monastery (Founders' Chapel)	
John II	1495	Batalha Monastery (Founders' Chapel); Originally buried in Silves Cathedral.	
Manuel I	1521	Hieronymites Monastery, Lisbon	
John III	1557	Hieronymites Monastery, Lisbon	
Sebastian I	1578	Hieronymites Monastery, Lisbon	
Henry I	1580	Hieronymites Monastery, Lisbon	
Anthony (disputed)	1595	Convent of the Cordeliers, Paris, France; His tomb is lost.	
Philip I	1598	El Escorial, San Lorenzo de El Escorial, Spain	
Philip II	1621	El Escorial, San Lorenzo de El Escorial, Spain	
Philip III	1665	El Escorial, San Lorenzo de El Escorial, Spain	
John IV	1656	Monastery of São Vicente de Fora (Pantheon of the House of Braganza), Lisbon	
Afonso VI	1683	Monastery of São Vicente de Fora (Pantheon of the House of Braganza), Lisbon	
Peter II	1706	Monastery of São Vicente de Fora (Pantheon of the House of Braganza), Lisbon	
John V	1750	Monastery of São Vicente de Fora (Pantheon of the House of Braganza), Lisbon; His organs are in the Palhavã Children's Chapel, in the same monastery.	
Joseph I	1777	Monastery of São Vicente de Fora (Pantheon of the House of Braganza), Lisbon	
Mary I	1816	Estrela Basilica, Lisbon; Originally buried in the Convent of Ajuda, in Rio de Janeiro, Brazil.	
John VI	1826	Monastery of São Vicente de Fora (Pantheon of the House of Braganza), Lisbon; His organs are in the Palhavã Children's Chapel, in the same monastery.	
Peter IV	1834	Monument to the Independence of Brazil, São Paulo, Brazil; Originally buried in the Pantheon of the House of Braganza. His heart is kept in the Lapa Church, in Porto.	
Michael	1866	Monastery of São Vicente de Fora (Pantheon of the House of Braganza), Lisbon; Originally buried in the Engelberg Friary, in Großheubach, Germany.	
Mary II	1853	Monastery of São Vicente de Fora (Pantheon of the House of Braganza), Lisbon	
Peter V	1861	Monastery of São Vicente de Fora (Pantheon of the House of Braganza), Lisbon	
Louis I	1889	Monastery of São Vicente de Fora (Pantheon of the House of Braganza), Lisbon	
Charles I	1908	Monastery of São Vicente de Fora (Pantheon of the House of Braganza), Lisbon	
Manuel II	1932	Monastery of São Vicente de Fora (Pantheon of the House of Braganza), Lisbon	

== Other royal burials (by place) ==
=== In Portugal ===
Place of burial	Image	Royals buried there
Monastery of the Holy Cross, Coimbra		Matilda of Savoy, Queen of Portugal (1157); Sancha of Portugal (c. 1167); Henry of Portugal (1189); Dulce of Aragon, Queen of Portugal (1198); Blanche of Portugal, Lady of Guadalajara (c. 1240)
Alcobaça Monastery		Urraca of Castile, Queen of Portugal (1220); Ferdinand of Portugal (c. 1262); Vincent of Portugal (1268); Sancha of Portugal (c. 1284); Beatrice of Castile, Queen of Portugal (1303); Inês de Castro, posthumously Queen of Portugal (1355)
Lorvão Abbey, Penacova		Constance of Portugal (1202); Sancha, Titular Queen of Portugal (1229); Theresa, Queen of Leon and Titular Queen of Portugal (1250)
Arouca Abbey		Mafalda, Queen of Castile and Titular Queen of Portugal (1256)
Convent of Saint Dominic, Lisbon		Afonso, Lord of Portalegre (1312)
Monastery of Saint Denis, Odivelas		Denis of Portugal (1317)
Monastery of Santa Clara-a-Nova, Coimbra		Elizabeth of Aragon, Queen of Portugal (1336)
Carmo Convent, Lisbon		Constance Manuel of Villena (1349); Catherine of Portugal (1463); Maria Anna of Austria, Queen of Portugal (1754)
Lisbon Cathedral		Louis of Portugal (1344); Beatrice of Castile, Queen of Portugal (1359); Blanche of Portugal (1389)
Monastery of Santa Clara-a-Velha, Coimbra		Maria, Marchioness of Tortosa (1377)
Braga Cathedral		Afonso, Prince of Portugal (1400)
Batalha Monastery		Philippa of Lancaster, Queen of Portugal (1415); John, Constable of Portugal (1442); Ferdinand of Portugal (1443); Eleanor of Aragon, Queen of Portugal (1445); Peter, Duke of Coimbra (1449); John, Prince of Portugal (1451); Isabella of Coimbra, Queen of Portugal (1455); Henry, Duke of Viseu (1460); Afonso, Prince of Portugal (1491)
Convent of Our Lady of the Conception, Beja		Ferdinand, Duke of Beja (1470)
Convent of Jesus, Aveiro		Joanna, Princess of Portugal (1490)
Madre de Deus Convent, Lisbon		Eleanor of Viseu, Queen of Portugal (1525)
Convent of Saint Claire, Lisbon		Joanna of Castile, Queen of Portugal and disputed Queen of Castile (1530)
Hieronymites Monastery, Lisbon		Anthony of Portugal (1516); Maria of Aragon, Queen of Portugal (1517); Charles of Portugal (1521); Afonso, Prince of Portugal (1526); Ferdinand, Duke of Guarda (1534); Denis of Portugal (1537); Manuel, Prince of Portugal (1537); Philip, Prince of Portugal (1539); Anthony of Portugal (1540); Afonso, Cardinal-Archbishop of Lisbon (1540); Edward, Duke of Guimarães (1540); John Manuel, Prince of Portugal (1554); Louis, Duke of Beja (1555); Catherine of Austria, Queen of Portugal (1578)
Our Lady of Light Church, Lisbon		Maria, Duchess of Viseu (1577)
Monastery of São Vicente de Fora, Lisbon		Anne of Braganza (1635); Teodósio, Prince of Brazil (1653); Joanna, Princess of Beira (1653); Louise de Guzmán, Queen of Portugal (1666); Maria Francesca of Savoy, Queen of Portugal (1683); John, Prince of Brazil (1688); Isabella Louise, Princess of Beira (1690); Maria Sophia of Neuburg, Queen of Portugal (1699); Theresa of Braganza (1704); Catherine, Queen of England (1705); Peter, Prince of Brazil (1714); Alexander of Braganza (1728); Charles of Braganza (1736); Francisca Josefa of Braganza (1736); Francis, Duke of Beja (1742); Anthony of Braganza (1757); John Francis of Braganza (1763); Manuel, Count of Ourém (1766); Maria Dorothea of Braganza (1771); Maria Clementina of Braganza (1776); Maria Isabella of Braganza (1777); Mariana Victoria of Spain, Queen of Portugal (1781); Peter III, King-consort of Portugal (1786); Joseph, Prince of Brazil (1788); Francis Anthony, Prince of Beira (1801); Maria Anne of Braganza (1813); Maria Benedita of Braganza (1829); Carlota Joaquina of Spain, Queen of Portugal (1830); Maria da Assunção of Braganza (1834); Auguste, Prince-consort of Portugal (1835); Maria of Braganza (1840); Leopoldo of Braganza (1849); Maria da Glória of Braganza (1851); Eugénia of Braganza (1853); Stephanie of Hohenzollern-Sigmaringen, Queen of Portugal (1859); Ferdinand of Portugal (1861); John, Duke of Beja (1861); Isabella Maria of Braganza (1876); Ferdinand II, King-consort of Portugal (1885); Maria Anna of Braganza (1888); Augusto, Duke of Coimbra (1889); Louis Philip, Prince Royal of Portugal (1908); Adelaide of Löwenstein-Wertheim-Rosenberg (1909); Afonso, Duke of Porto (1920); Amélie of Orléans, Queen of Portugal (1951)
Convent of the Augustines, Vila Viçosa		Michael of Braganza (1640); Duarte Nuno of Braganza (1976)
Convent of Chagas, Vila Viçosa		Maria Francisca of Orléans-Braganza (1968)

=== Outside Portugal ===
Place of burial	Image	Royals buried there
Saint Mary Church, Wamba, Spain		Urraca, Queen of Leon (1211)
Clairvaux Abbey, Ville-sous-la-Ferté, France		Theresa, Countess of Flanders (1218)
Saint Bendt Church, Ringsted, Denmark		Berengaria, Queen of Denmark (1221); Eleanor, Queen of Denmark (1231)
Marquette Abbey, Lille, France		Ferdinand, Count-consort of Flanders (1233)
Convent of Saint Francis, Palma de Mallorca, Spain		Peter, Lord of Balearic Islands (1258)
Monastery of Saint Mary, Nájera, Spain		Mencía López de Haro, Queen of Portugal (c. 1270)
Monastery of Saint Benedict, Sahagún, Spain		Constance, Queen of Castile (1313)
Abbey of Las Huelgas, Burgos, Spain		Blanche of Portugal (1321)
Poblet Abbey, Vimbodí i Poblet, Spain		Eleanor, Queen of Aragon (1348)
Monastery of Saint Clement, Seville, Spain		Maria, Queen of Castile (1357)
Burgos Cathedral, Spain		Beatrice, Countess of Alburquerque (1381)
Convent of Saint Stephen, Salamanca, Spain		John, Duke of Valencia de Campos (c. 1396)
Monastery of Saint Mary, Guadalupe, Spain		Denis, Lord of Cifuentes (c. 1403)
Convent of Our Lady of Mercy, Valladolid, Spain		Leonor Teles, Queen of Portugal (c. 1405)
Neukloster Abbey, Wiener Neustadt, Austria		Eleanor, Holy Roman Empress (1467)
Champmol Monastery, Dijon, France		Isabella, Duchess of Burgundy (1471)
Basilica of Saint Francis the Great, Madrid, Spain		Joanna, Queen of Castile (1475)
Santa Isabel de Los Reyes Convent, Toledo, Spain		Isabella of Aragon, Queen of Portugal (1498)
Granada Cathedral, Spain		Miguel da Paz, Prince of Portugal and Asturias (1500)
Cimiez Cathedral, Nice, France		Beatrice of Portugal, Duchess of Savoy (1538)
El Escorial, San Lorenzo de El Escorial, Spain		Isabella, Holy Roman Empress (1539); Maria Manuela, Princess of Portugal (1545); Eleanor of Austria, Queen of Portugal and France (1558); Margaret of Austria, Queen of Spain and Portugal (1611); Elisabeth of France, Queen of Spain and Portugal (1644); Mariana Victoria of Braganza (1788); Maria Isabella, Queen of Spain (1818)
Convent of the Salesas Reales, Madrid, Spain		Barbara, Queen of Spain (1758)
Trieste Cathedral, Italy		Maria Francesca, Countess of Molina (1834); Maria Theresa, Princess of Beira (1874)
Church of Saint Anthony of the Portuguese, Rome, Italy		Ana de Jesus, Marquise of Loulé (1857)
Convent of Saint Anthony, Rio de Janeiro, Brazil		John Charles, Prince of Beira (1822)
Monument to the Independence of Brazil, São Paulo, Brazil		Maria Leopoldina of Austria, Empress of Brazil and Queen of Portugal (1826)
Dresden Cathedral, Germany		Maria Anne of Braganza (1884)
Basilica of Superga, Turin, Italy		Maria Pia of Savoy, Queen of Portugal (1911)
Hedinger Church, Sigmaringen, Germany		Antónia, Princess of Hohenzollern (1913)
Langenstein Castle, Orsingen-Nenzingen, Germany		Augusta Victoria of Hohenzollern (1966)
Verona Monumental Cemetery, Verona, Italy		Maria Pia of Saxe-Coburg Braganza (1995)

== See also ==
- Burial places of British royalty
- Burial places of members of the Brazilian imperial family
