= Infante Alexandre of Portugal =

Infante Alexandre
- Born: 24 September 1723; Ribeira Palace, Lisbon, Portugal
- Died: 2 August 1728 (aged 4); Ribeira Palace, Lisbon, Portugal
- Burial: Royal Pantheon of the House of Braganza, Lisbon, Portugal
Names
- Portuguese: Alexandre Francisco José António Nicolau de Bragança; English: Alexander Francis Joseph Anthony Nicholas of Braganza
- House: House of Braganza
- Father: John V of Portugal
- Mother: Maria Anna of Austria

Infante Alexandre of Portugal (Alexandre Francisco José António Nicolau; English: Alexander Francis Joseph Anthony Nicholas, 24 September 1723 – 2 August 1728) was a Portuguese infante, the sixth and last child of King John V of Portugal and his wife Maria Anna of Austria.

== Biography ==
Born on 24 September 1723 in the Ribeira Palace, in Lisbon, the infante was baptized on 6 December as Alexandre Francisco José António Nicolau de Bragança.

In his short life, he revealed an advanced intelligence for his age, through his prompt and ingenious observations, as described by the genealogist António Caetano de Sousa.

He died in the same Palace where he was born on 2 August 1728, at the age of 4, victim of smallpox. He is buried in the Royal Pantheon of the House of Braganza.

== Ancestry ==
Ancestors of Infante Alexandre of Portugal

16. Teodósio II, Duke of Braganza
8. John IV of Portugal
17. Ana de Velasco y Girón
4. Peter II of Portugal
18. Juan Manuel de Guzmán y Silva, VIII Duke of Medina Sidonia
9. Luisa de Guzmán
19. Juana de Sandoval y la Cerda
2. John V of Portugal
20. Wolfgang William, Count Palatine of Neuburg
10. Philip William, Elector Palatine
21. Magdalene of Bavaria
5. Maria Sophia of Neuburg
22. George II, Landgrave of Hesse-Darmstadt
11. Elisabeth Amalie of Hesse-Darmstadt
23. Sophia Eleonore of Saxony
1. Alexandre of Braganza
24. Ferdinand II, Holy Roman Emperor
12. Ferdinand III, Holy Roman Emperor
25. Maria Anna of Bavaria
6. Leopold I, Holy Roman Emperor
26. Philip III of Spain
13. Maria Anna of Austria
27. Margaret of Austria
3. Maria Anna of Austria
28. Wolfgang William, Count Palatine of Neuburg (= 20)
14. Philip William, Elector Palatine (= 10)
29. Magdalene of Bavaria (= 21)
7. Eleonor Magdalene of Neuburg
30. George II, Landgrave of Hesse-Darmstadt (= 22)
15. Elisabeth Amalie of Hesse-Darmstadt (= 11)
31. Sophia Eleonore of Saxony (= 23)
