= Joan of Portugal (disambiguation) =

Joan of Portugal, or Joanna, may refer to:

- Joan of Portugal (1439–1475), repudiated consort of Henry IV of Castile
- Joanna, Princess of Portugal (1452–1490), beatified nun
- Joanna of Austria, Princess of Portugal, 1535-1572, sister of Philip II of Spain, married to João Manuel, Prince of Portugal.
- Joana, Princess of Beira (1635–1653), daughter of John IV of Portugal
