= Infante Manuel, Count of Ourém =

Portuguese infante (1697–1766)

Infante Manuel
- Count of Ourém
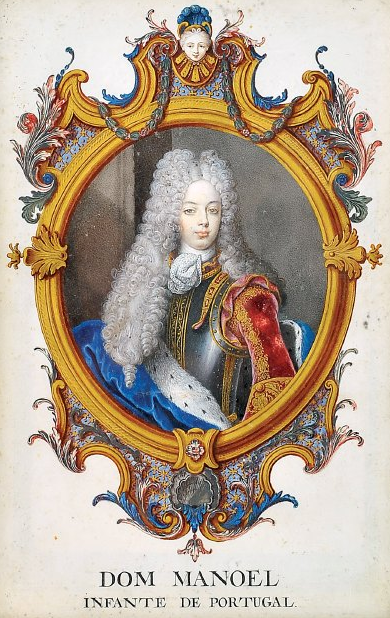
- Born: 3 August 1697; Ribeira Palace, Lisbon, Portugal
- Died: 3 August 1766 (aged 69); Royal Palace of Belas, Sintra, Portugal
- Burial: Pantheon of the House of Braganza, Lisbon, Portugal
Names
- Manuel José Francisco António Caetano Estêvão Bartolomeu
- House: Braganza
- Father: Peter II of Portugal
- Mother: Maria Sophia of Neuburg

Infante Manuel, Count of Ourém, KGF (Portuguese pronunciation: [mɐnuˈɛl]; Manuel José Francisco António Caetano Estêvão Bartolomeu; (3 August 1697 - 3 August 1766) was a Portuguese infante (prince), seventh child of Peter II, King of Portugal, and his wife Maria Sophia of Neuburg. He was the brother of King John V of Portugal. He was a candidate for the Polish throne.

== Biography ==
=== Early life and background ===
Born in Lisbon on 3 August 1697, Infante Manuel was the son of Peter II of Portugal and Maria Sophia of Neuburg. His aunt, Eleonore Magdalene, was the wife of Holy Roman Emperor Leopold I. Manuel was the favorite child of his father, who died in 1706 and was succeeded by Manuel's older brother John V of Portugal.

=== Career abroad ===
In his youth Manuel harbored a strong desire to travel abroad and pursue a military career. On the night of 4 November 1715, the Infante embarked in secret on an English ship to the Netherlands. Ignoring King John V's orders to return home, Manuel partied in The Hague for three months and subsequently travelled to Paris and Austria.

During the Austro-Turkish War, Manuel entered the service of Prince Eugene of Savoy. The Infante participated in the Battle of Petrovaradin in 1716 and the conquest of Belgrade in 1717. In 1718, at the age of twenty-one, he rose to the rank of Maréchal de Camp.

After the war he traveled from court to court, living a life of pleasure, inspiring several contemporary writers. In 1721 he received the Order of the Golden Fleece.

In 1728 he became one of the candidates for the hand of the wealthy Maria Zofia Sieniawska supported by the Habsburgs in attempt to gain a strong position in Poland before the Royal Election of 1733. Well known at the Austrian and Russian court, he was even proposed as the next King of Poland for a short time in 1733, in the onset of the War of the Polish Succession.

=== Return to Portugal ===
After nineteen years of absence, Manuel returned to Portugal in 1734. He spent the last years of his life in Quinta de Belas, leading a socially active life, surrounded by writers and artists. He died unmarried and without legitimate issue at the Quinta de Belas on his 69th birthday. Manuel is buried at the Royal Pantheon of the Braganza Dynasty in Lisbon.

== Ancestry ==
Ancestors of Infante Manuel, Count of Ourém

8. Teodósio II, Duke of Braganza
4. John IV of Portugal
9. Ana de Velasco y Girón
2. Peter II of Portugal
10. Manuel, 8th Duke of Medina Sidonia
5. Luisa de Guzmán
11. Juana de Sandoval y de la Cerda
1. Manuel of Braganza
12. Wolfgang William, Count Palatine of Neuburg
6. Philip William, Elector Palatine
13. Magdalene of Bavaria
3. Maria Sophia of Neuburg
14. George II, Landgrave of Hesse-Darmstadt
7. Elisabeth Amalie of Hesse-Darmstadt
15. Sophia Eleonore of Saxony

== See also ==
- Treaty of the Three Black Eagles
