= João, Prince of Brazil =

Heir apparent to Peter II of Portugal (1688)

João
- Prince of Brazil, Duke of Braganza (more...)
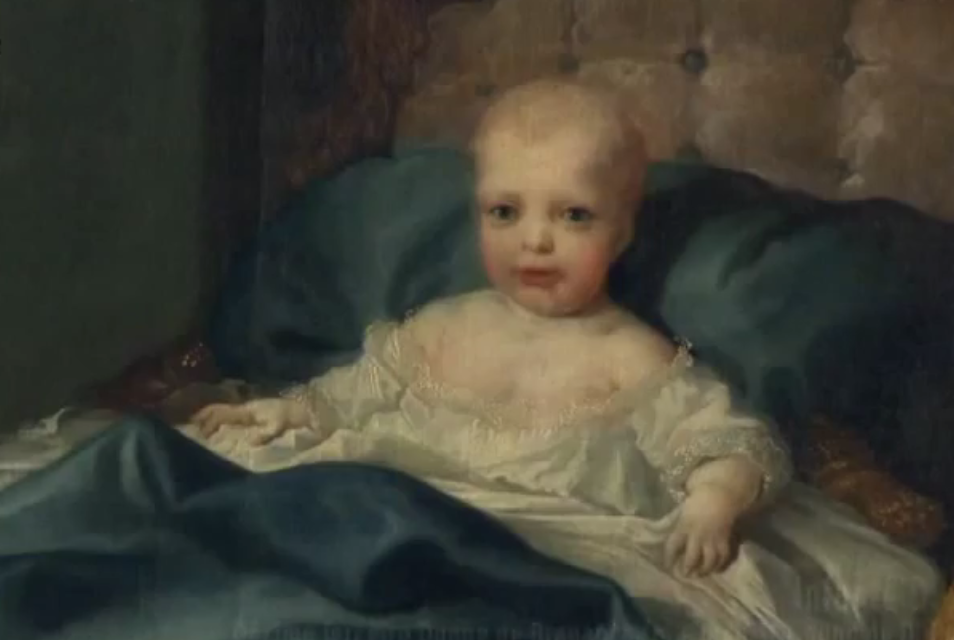
- John, Duke of Braganza, by Domenico Duprà
- Born: 30 August 1688; Lisbon, Portugal
- Died: 17 September 1688 (aged 18 days); Lisbon, Portugal
- Burial: Royal Pantheon, Lisbon, Portugal
Names
- João Carlos Francisco António Xavier de Paula Domingos Miguel Gabriel Rafael
- House: Braganza
- Father: Peter II of Portugal
- Mother: Maria Sophia of Neuburg

João, Prince of Brazil (30 August 1688 – 17 September 1688) was the first child of Peter II of Portugal and Maria Sophia of Neuburg. He was made Prince of Brazil and Duke of Braganza upon his birth.

== Ancestry ==
Ancestors of João, Prince of Brazil

8. Teodósio II, Duke of Braganza
4. John IV of Portugal
9. Ana de Velasco y Girón
2. Peter II of Portugal
10. Manuel, 8th Duke of Medina Sidonia
5. Luisa de Guzmán
11. Juana de Sandoval y de la Cerda
1. João, Prince of Brazil
12. Wolfgang William, Count Palatine of Neuburg
6. Philip William, Elector Palatine
13. Magdalene of Bavaria
3. Maria Sophia of Neuburg
14. George II, Landgrave of Hesse-Darmstadt
7. Elisabeth Amalie of Hesse-Darmstadt
15. Sophia Eleonore of Saxony
