= Infante António of Portugal =

Portuguese infante (1695–1757)

Infante António
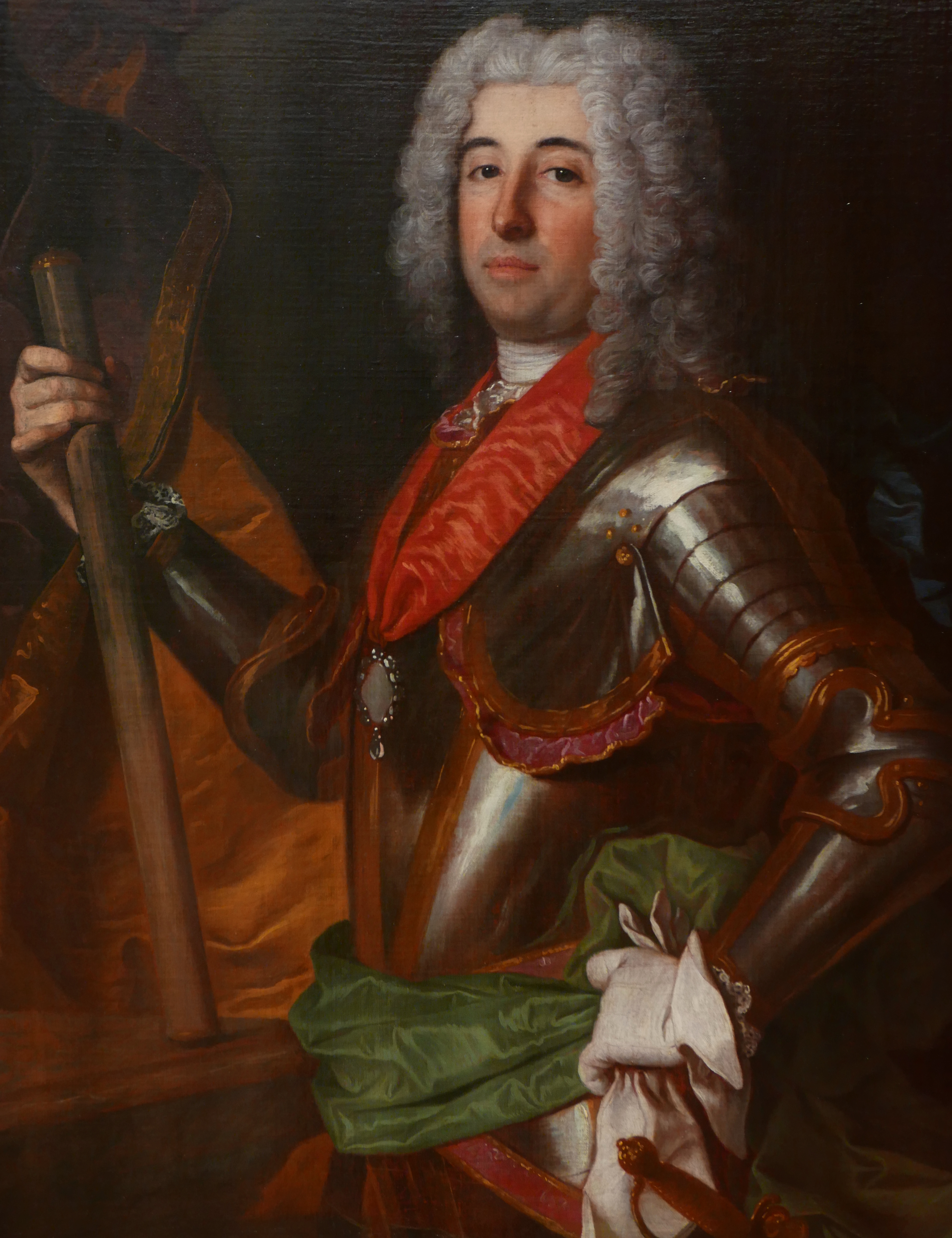
- Portrait by Jean Ranc, 1729
- Born: 15 March 1695; Ribeira Palace, Lisbon, Kingdom of Portugal
- Died: 20 October 1757 (aged 62); Royal Palace of Alcântara, Alcântara, Lisbon, Kingdom of Portugal
- Burial: Pantheon of the House of Braganza, Lisbon, Portugal
Names
- António Francisco Xavier Benedito Teodósio Leopoldo Henrique
- House: Braganza
- Father: Peter II
- Mother: Maria Sophia of Neuburg

Infante António of Portugal (European Portuguese pronunciation: [ɐ̃ˈtɔni.u, ɐ̃ˈtɔnju]; 15 March 1695 – 20 October 1757) was a Portuguese infante (prince), the third surviving son of Peter II, King of Portugal, and his wife Maria Sophia of Neuburg.

== Life ==
António Francisco Xavier Benedito Teodósio Leopoldo Henrique was born in Lisbon on 15 March 1695.

== Death ==
He died unmarried and without legitimate issue in the same city, on 20 October 1757, of apoplexy and is buried at the Royal Pantheon of the Braganza Dynasty, in Lisbon.

== Ancestry ==
Ancestors of Infante António of Portugal

8. Teodósio II, Duke of Braganza
4. John IV of Portugal
9. Ana de Velasco Girón
2. Peter II of Portugal
10. Manuel de Guzmán Silva, Duke of Medina Sidonia
5. Luisa de Guzmán
11. Juana de Sandoval de la Cerda
1. António of Braganza
12. Wolfgang William, Count Palatine of Neuburg
6. Philip William, Elector Palatine
13. Magdalene of Bavaria
3. Maria Sophia of Neuburg
14. George II, Landgrave of Hesse-Darmstadt
7. Elisabeth Amalie of Hesse-Darmstadt
15. Sophia Eleonore of Saxony
