= Francisca of Portugal =

Franscisca of Portugal can refer to:

- Infanta Francisca Josefa of Portugal (1699–1736), daughter of Peter II of Portugal and Marie Sophie of Neuberg
- Princess Francisca of Brazil (1824–1898), daughter of Pedro I of Brazil and Maria Leopoldina of Austria.
