= Infanta Maria da Assunção of Braganza =

Portuguese princess

Infanta Maria da Assunção
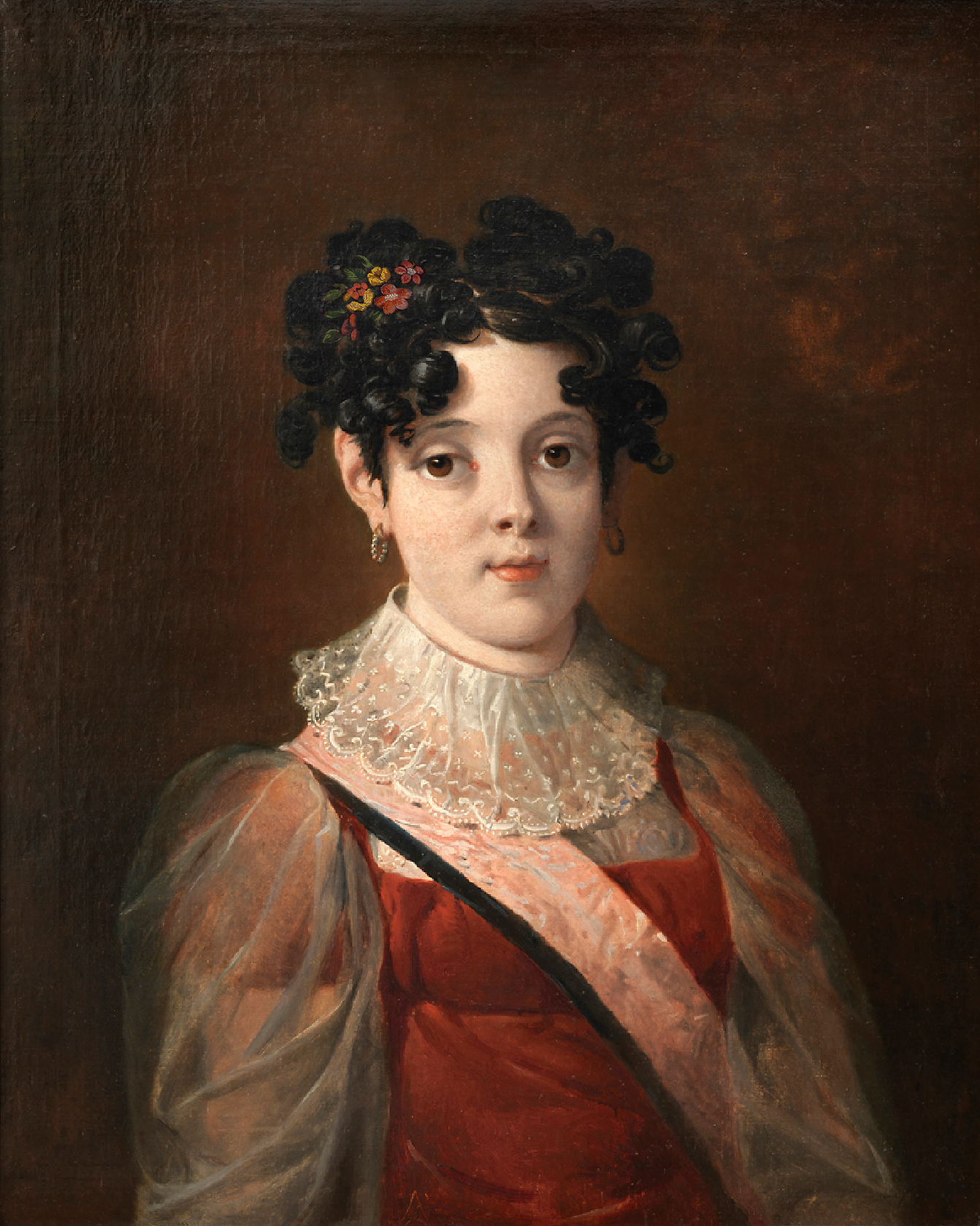
- Portrait, c. 1820
- Born: 25 June 1805; Queluz, Portugal
- Died: 7 January 1834 (aged 28); Santarém, Portugal
- Burial: Royal Pantheon of the House of Braganza
Names
- Maria da Assunção Ana Joana Josefa Luísa Gonzaga Francisca de Assis Xavier de Paula Joaquina Antónia de S. Tiago
- House: House of Braganza
- Father: John VI of Portugal and Brazil
- Mother: Carlota Joaquina of Spain

Infanta Maria da Assunção of Braganza (Portuguese pronunciation: [mɐˈɾiɐ ðasũˈsɐ̃w]; English: Mary of the Assumption); Queluz, 25 June 1805 – Santarém, 7 January 1834) was a Portuguese infanta (princess), daughter of King John VI of Portugal and Carlota Joaquina of Borbón.

== Early years and Brazilian exile ==
Born at the Queluz National Palace during a period of escalating Napoleonic threats, Maria da Assunção's childhood was uprooted by the French invasion of 1807. At the age of two, she joined the royal family in their historic flight to Rio de Janeiro. She spent nearly fifteen years in South America, receiving an education shaped by the traditionalist and highly religious atmosphere of the São Cristóvão Palace, before returning to Lisbon with the court in 1821.

== Political role in the Liberal Wars ==
Following the death of her father in 1826, Maria da Assunção emerged as a staunch defender of the absolutist cause during the Liberal Wars. She remained a committed partisan of her brother, the traditionalist monarch Dom Miguel, and was closely aligned with the reactionary faction led by her mother, Queen Carlota Joaquina.

Unlike her liberal-leaning relatives, she rejected the Constitutional Charter of 1826, viewing the shift toward constitutionalism as a betrayal of the Braganza legacy. Her presence in Dom Miguel's court at Santarém provided a symbol of dynastic continuity for the absolutist regime throughout the civil conflict.

== Death and interment ==
Maria da Assunção died unmarried at the age of 28 in Santarém on 7 January 1834. Her death occurred amid the cholera epidemic that ravaged the country during the closing stages of the civil war.

Initially interred at the Church of the Miracle (Igreja do Milagre) in Santarém, her remains were eventually moved following the cessation of hostilities. She was transferred to the Royal Pantheon of the House of Braganza in Lisbon, where she was interred alongside other members of her dynasty.

== Ancestry ==
Ancestors of Infanta Maria da Assunção of Braganza

8. John V of Portugal
4. Pedro III of Portugal
9. Maria Anna of Austria
2. João VI of Portugal and Brazil
10. Joseph I of Portugal
5. Maria I of Portugal and Brazil
11. Mariana Victoria of Spain
1. Infanta Maria da Assunção
12. Charles III of Spain
6. Charles IV of Spain
13. Maria Amalia of Saxony
3. Carlota Joaquina of Spain
14. Philip, Duke of Parma
7. Maria Luisa of Parma
15. Louise Élisabeth of France
