= Marianna of Austria =

Marianna of Austria may refer to:

- Mariana of Austria, Queen of Spain
- Maria Anna of Austria, Queen of Portugal
