= Burial places of British royalty =

These burial places of British royalty record the known graves of monarchs who have reigned in some part of the British Isles (currently includes only the monarchs of Scotland, England, native princes of Wales to 1283, or monarchs of Great Britain, and the United Kingdom), as well as members of their royal families.

== Monarchs of England (to 1603) ==
=== Pre-conquest ===
Name	Death	Place of burial	Image
Egbert	839	Old Minster, Winchester; Bones now thought to be in one of the six mortuary caskets in Winchester Cathedral	Winchester Cathedral
Æthelwulf	855	Steyning Church, then the Old Minster, Winchester; Bones now thought to be in one of the six mortuary caskets in Winchester Cathedral	Ethelwulf's tombstone, from St Andrew's Church, Steyning
Æthelbald	860	Sherborne Abbey, Dorset	Sherborne Abbey
Æthelbert	866	Sherborne Abbey, Dorset	Sherborne Abbey
Æthelred I	871	Wimborne Minster, Dorset	Wimborne Minster
Alfred the Great	899	Originally Old Minster, Winchester; Moved to New Minster then Hyde Abbey; His remains were lost after the ruin of the abbey following the English Reformation	Hyde Abbey
Edward the Elder	924	New Minster, Winchester; Moved to Hyde Abbey; His remains were lost after the ruin of the abbey following the Reformation	
Æthelstan	939	Malmesbury Abbey, Wiltshire; His remains were lost after the ruin of the abbey following the Reformation. The tomb and effigy survived.	The (now empty) tomb of Athelstan in Malmesbury Abbey
Edmund I	946	Glastonbury Abbey	Glastonbury Abbey
Eadred	955	Old Minster, Winchester; Bones now thought to be in one of the six mortuary caskets in Winchester Cathedral	Winchester Cathedral
Eadwig (Edwy)	959	Bones now thought to be in one of the six mortuary caskets in Winchester Cathedral	Winchester Cathedral
Edgar	975	Glastonbury Abbey	Glastonbury Abbey
Edward the Martyr	978	Shaftesbury Abbey, Dorset; Bones reputed to be his now reside in the Church of St. Edward the Martyr, Brookwood.	Shrine of St. Edward the Martyr
Æthelred the Unready	1016	Old St Paul's Cathedral; Tomb lost in the Great Fire of London, referenced as such on a plaque outside the crypt of the present church.	Old St Paul's
Edmund Ironside	1016	Glastonbury Abbey	Glastonbury Abbey
Sweyn Forkbeard	1014	Roskilde Cathedral, Denmark	Roskilde Cathedral
Cnut the Great	1035	Old Minster, Winchester; Bones now thought to be in one of the six mortuary caskets in Winchester Cathedral	Winchester Cathedral
Harold Harefoot	1040	St Clement Danes, London	St Clement Danes
Harthacnut	1042	Bones now thought to be in one of the six mortuary caskets in Winchester Cathedral	Winchester Cathedral
Edward the Confessor	1066	Westminster Abbey. Edward was the first king buried in the church. In the 13th century, Henry III had his remains transferred to a shrine in the rebuilt abbey, in the new chapel named after him.	.
Harold Godwinson	1066	Waltham Abbey, Essex (by repute)	Waltham Abbey

=== Post-conquest ===
Name	Death	Place of burial	Images
William I	1087	Abbaye-aux-Hommes, Caen, Normandy; His remains were destroyed in 1562 & 1793. The tomb survived.	Men's abbey, St Etienne church, chevet
William II	1100	Winchester Cathedral	Winchester Cathedral
Henry I	1135	Reading Abbey, Berkshire; His remains were lost after the ruin of the abbey following the Reformation.	Reading Abbey
Stephen	1154	Faversham Abbey, Kent; The abbey was demolished after the Reformation in 1538 and Stephen's grave and remains were destroyed, reportedly thrown into the nearby Faversham Creek when the abbey was demolished.	
Matilda	1167	Rouen Cathedral, Normandy, France; Remains transferred from Bec Abbey in Normandy following the French Revolution.	Rouen Cathedral
Henry II	1189	Fontevraud Abbey, Anjou, France; The graves no longer exist and their remains were probably destroyed during the French Revolution. Their tombs and effigies survived.	Henry II
Richard I	1199	Fontevraud Abbey, Anjou, France; The graves no longer exist and their remains were probably destroyed during the French Revolution. Their tombs and effigies survived.	Tomb of Richard I and Isabella of Angoulême
John	1216	Worcester Cathedral	Tomb in Worcester Cathedral
Henry III	1272	Edward the Confessor's Chapel, Westminster Abbey	Tomb in Westminster Abbey
Edward I	1307	Edward the Confessor's Chapel, Westminster Abbey	Tomb in Westminster Abbey
Edward II	1327	Gloucester Cathedral	Tomb in Gloucester Cathedral
Edward III	1377	Edward the Confessor's Chapel, Westminster Abbey	Tomb in Westminster Abbey
Richard II	1400	Kings Langley Priory (reburied Edward the Confessor's Chapel, Westminster Abbey 1413)	Tomb in Westminster Abbey
Henry IV	1413	Canterbury Cathedral	Canterbury Cathedral
Henry V	1422	Westminster Abbey	Tomb in Westminster Abbey
Henry VI	1471	Windsor Castle (reburied in St George's Chapel 1484)	St George's Chapel
Edward IV	1483	St George's Chapel at Windsor Castle	Tomb in St. George's Chapel
Edward V	1483?	Traditionally believed to have been murdered and buried secretly in the Tower of London. Bones presumed to be his and those of his brother Richard, Duke of York were unearthed in the Tower in 1674 and re-buried in Westminster Abbey four years later.	
Richard III	1485	Leicester Cathedral; Originally buried across the street in Greyfriars, but the original tomb was lost when the friary was demolished in 1538. The remains of Richard III were recovered by an archaeological dig in 2012 and re-interred in 2015.	
Henry VII	1509	Henry VII Lady Chapel, Westminster Abbey	Tomb in Westminster Abbey
Henry VIII	1547	St George's Chapel at Windsor Castle	
Edward VI	1553	Henry VII Lady Chapel, Westminster Abbey	Tomb in Westminster Abbey
Jane	1554	St Peter ad Vincula, Tower of London	St Peter ad Vincula - resting place of those executed for treason
Mary I	1558	Henry VII Lady Chapel, Westminster Abbey	
Elizabeth I	1603	Henry VII Lady Chapel, Westminster Abbey	

== Monarchs of Scotland (to 1603) ==
Name	Death	Place of burial	Image
Kenneth MacAlpin	858	Iona Abbey	Iona Abbey
Donald I	862	Iona Abbey	Iona Abbey
Constantine I	877	Iona Abbey	Iona Abbey
Áed	878	Iona Abbey	Iona Abbey
Eochaid	Unknown	Unknown	
Giric	889	Iona Abbey	Iona Abbey
Donald II	900	Iona Abbey	Iona Abbey
Constantine II	952	Culdee monastery at St Andrews (probable)	
Malcolm I	954	Iona Abbey	Iona Abbey
Indulf	962	Iona Abbey	Iona Abbey
Dub	967	Iona Abbey	Iona Abbey
Cuilén	972	Iona Abbey	Iona Abbey
Kenneth II	995	Iona Abbey	Iona Abbey
Constantine III	997	Iona Abbey	Iona Abbey
Kenneth III	1005	Iona Abbey	Iona Abbey
Malcolm II	1034	Iona Abbey	Iona Abbey
Duncan I	1040	Iona Abbey	Iona Abbey
Macbeth	1057	Iona Abbey	Iona Abbey
Lulach	1058	Iona Abbey	Iona Abbey
Malcolm Canmore	1093	Tynemouth, then moved to Dunfermline Abbey	Dunfermline Abbey
Donald III	after 1097	Iona Abbey	Iona Abbey
Duncan II	1094	Dunfermline Abbey	Dunfermline Abbey
Edgar	1107	Dunfermline Abbey	Dunfermline Abbey
Alexander I	1124	Dunfermline Abbey	Dunfermline Abbey
David I	1153	Dunfermline Abbey	Dunfermline Abbey
Malcolm IV	1165	Dunfermline Abbey	Dunfermline Abbey
William I	1214	Arbroath Abbey	Arbroath Abbey
Alexander II	1249	Melrose Abbey	Melrose Abbey
Alexander III	1286	Dunfermline Abbey	
Margaret, Maid of Norway	1290	Christ's Kirk, Bergen	Christ's Kirk, Bergen
John Balliol	1313	France?	
Robert the Bruce	1329	Body interred at Dunfermline Abbey; His heart was removed, taken on Crusade, then buried at Melrose Abbey	Marker for Heart burial of Bruce
David II	1371	Holyrood Abbey, Edinburgh	Holyrood Abbey, Edinburgh
Robert II	1390	Scone Abbey	
Robert III	1406	Paisley Abbey	Paisley Abbey
James I	1437	Perth Charterhouse, Perth	
James II	1460	Holyrood Abbey, Edinburgh	
James III	1488	Cambuskenneth Abbey	The tomb of James III, funded by Queen Victoria
James IV	1513	Probably displayed at Monastery of Sheen, London; Afterwards unknown	
James V	1542	Holyrood Abbey, Edinburgh	
Mary I	1587	Peterborough Cathedral (1588–1612) then Westminster Abbey	a replica of Mary's tombstone in Westminster abbey at the Museum of Scotland, Edinburgh

== Native princes of Wales (to 1283) ==
Name	Death	Place of burial	Image
Owain Gwynedd	1170	Bangor Cathedral	
Dafydd ab Owain Gwynedd (prince of north Wales only)	1203	England?	
The Lord Rhys (prince of south Wales only)	1197	St. David's Cathedral	
Llywelyn ab Iorwerth	1240	Body interred at Aberconwy Abbey; Later (apparently) removed to Maenan Abbey; sarcophagus now found at St Grwst's Church, Llanrwst	
Dafydd ap Llywelyn	1246	Body interred at Aberconwy Abbey; current whereabouts unknown	
Llywelyn ap Gruffudd	1282	Cwmhir Abbey	
Dafydd ap Gruffudd	1283	Hanged, drawn and quartered at Shrewsbury	

== Monarchs since 1603 ==
(of England, and Scotland (1603–1707); of Great Britain (1707–1801); of United Kingdom (1801–present))

Name	Death	Place of burial	Image
James VI and I	1625	Henry VII Chapel, Westminster Abbey	
Charles I	1649	St George's Chapel, Windsor Castle	

=== Interregnum ===
As Lords Protector the Cromwells served as heads of state and exercised monarchical power

Name	Death	Place of burial	Image
Oliver Cromwell (Protector)	1658	Tyburn, London. Moved from Westminster Abbey in 1660 and dumped in a pit after posthumous execution. Reputed head buried at Sidney Sussex College in 1960.	
Richard Cromwell (Protector)	1712	All Saints Church, Hursley, Hampshire	

=== Restored monarchy ===
Name	Death	Place of burial	Image
Charles II	1685	Henry VII Chapel, Westminster Abbey	
James II and VII	1701	Chapel of St Edmund, Church of the English Benedictines, Rue St. Jacques, Paris (lost at the French Revolution)	
Mary II	1694	Henry VII Chapel, Westminster Abbey	
William III and II	1702	Henry VII Chapel, Westminster Abbey	
Anne	1714	Henry VII Chapel, Westminster Abbey	
George I	1727	Chapel of Leine Castle in Hanover, Germany; moved from the crypt to the Welfenmausoleum at Herrenhausen on 5 December 1957. He was the last British monarch buried outside of the British Isles.	Welfenmausoleum
George II	1760	Henry VII Chapel, Westminster Abbey	
George III	1820	St George's Chapel, Windsor Castle	
George IV	1830	St George's Chapel, Windsor Castle	
William IV	1837	St George's Chapel, Windsor Castle	
Victoria	1901	Royal Mausoleum, Frogmore, Windsor	Mausoleum in Frogmore Gardens, Windsor of Queen Victoria and her consort Prince Albert
Edward VII	1910	St George's Chapel, Windsor Castle	
George V	1936	St George's Chapel, Windsor Castle	
Edward VIII	1972	Royal Burial Ground, Frogmore, Windsor	
George VI	1952	King George VI Memorial Chapel, St George's Chapel, Windsor Castle	
Elizabeth II	2022	King George VI Memorial Chapel, St George's Chapel, Windsor Castle	

== Jacobite pretenders ==
Name	Death	Place of burial	Image
James Stuart ("Old Pretender") Charles Edward Stuart ("Bonnie Prince Charlie") Henry Benedict Stuart	1766 1788 1807	St. Peter's Basilica, Vatican (see also Monument to the Royal Stuarts)	Tomb of James Francis Edward Stuart, Charles Edward Stuart and Henry Benedict Stuart, "grotte vaticane" monument to the Royal Stuarts, Rome

== Other Royal burials (by place) ==
Cemetery location	Cemetery image	Name of royals buried there	Grave image
York Minster		William of Hatfield (1337)	
Duchess of Kent's Mausoleum, Frogmore	Duchess of Kent's Mausoleum	Princess Victoria, Duchess of Kent (1861)	
Royal Mausoleum, Frogmore		Prince Albert (1861) Edward, Duke of Windsor, formerly Edward VIII (1972)	
St George's Chapel at Windsor Castle		Elizabeth Woodville (1492) Jane Seymour (1537) Princess Amelia (1810) Princess Augusta, Dowager Duchess of Brunswick-Lüneburg (1813) Princess Charlotte (1817) Queen Charlotte (1818) Prince Edward, Duke of Kent and Strathearn (1820) Prince Frederick, Duke of York and Albany (1827) Princess Augusta (1840) Adelaide of Saxe-Meiningen (1849) Prince Leopold, Duke of Albany (1884) Prince Albert Victor, Duke of Clarence and Avondale (1892) Princess Mary Adelaide of Cambridge (1897) Prince Francis, Duke of Teck (1900) Alexandra of Denmark (1925) Prince Adolphus, Duke of Cambridge (re-interred 1930) Princess Augusta, Duchess of Cambridge (re-interred 1930) Mary of Teck (1953) Princess Margaret, Countess of Snowdon (ashes 2002) Elizabeth Bowes-Lyon (2002) Prince Philip, Duke of Edinburgh (2021)	
Royal burial ground, Frogmore	Royal Burial Ground	Princess Helena Prince Arthur of Connaught Prince Arthur, Duke of Connaught Princess Louise, Duchess of Argyll Prince William of Gloucester (1972) Prince Henry, Duke of Gloucester Princess Alice, Duchess of Gloucester Prince George, Duke of Kent Princess Marina, Duchess of Kent (1968) Katharine, Duchess of Kent (2025) Princess Victoria (1936) Wallis, Duchess of Windsor (1986) Princess Alice, Countess of Athlone The Earl of Athlone Viscount Trematon Lady May Abel Smith Sir Henry Abel Smith Sir Angus Ogilvy	
St Ninian's Chapel, Braemar	St Ninian's Chapel	Alexander Duff, 1st Duke of Fife (1912) Princess Alexandra, 2nd Duchess of Fife (1959, ashes) The Princess Royal, Duchess of Fife (1931) Alastair Windsor, 2nd Duke of Connaught and Strathearn (1943)	
Althorp		Diana, Princess of Wales (1997)	
Westminster Abbey	Westminster Abbey	Edith of Wessex (1079) Matilda of Scotland (1118) Eleanor of Castile Philippa of Hainault Anne of Bohemia Catherine of Valois Anne Neville (1485) Elizabeth of York Anne of Cleves (1557) Henry Frederick, Prince of Wales (1612) Anne of Denmark (1619) Mary, Princess Royal and Princess of Orange (1660) Elizabeth of Bohemia (1662) Prince George of Denmark (1708) Caroline of Ansbach (1737) Frederick, Prince of Wales (1751) Princess Augusta of Saxe-Gotha (1772)	
Peterborough Cathedral	Peterborough Cathedral	Catherine of Aragon (1536)	
St Peter ad Vincula, Tower of London	St Peter ad Vincula is the resting place of those executed in the Tower	Anne Boleyn (1536) Catherine Howard (1542) Lady Jane Grey (1554) Guildford Dudley (1554)	
Sudeley Castle		Catherine Parr (1548)	
St Mildred's Church, Whippingham, Isle of Wight		Princess Beatrice (1944) and Prince Henry of Battenberg (1896)	
St Mary Magdalene Church, Sandringham, Norfolk		Prince John (1919)	
Vadstena Abbey, Sweden		Queen Philippa of Denmark, Norway and Sweden (1430)	
The Royal Cemetery, Solna, Sweden		Crown Princess Margareta of Sweden (1922)	
Ypres Town Cemetery and Extension, Ypres, Belgium.		Prince Maurice of Battenberg (1914)	
Brunswick Cathedral, Braunschweig (Brunswick), Germany.		Caroline of Brunswick (1821)	
Convent of the Visitations, Chaillot, near Paris		Mary of Modena (1718)	
Monastery of São Vicente de Fora (Pantheon of the House of Braganza), Lisbon, Portugal		Catherine of Braganza (1705/6)	
Basilica of St Denis, Paris, France		Francis II of France (husband of Mary Queen of Scots) (1560) Henrietta Maria of France (1669)	
El Escorial, San Lorenzo de El Escorial, Spain		Philip II of Spain (widower of Mary I of England) (1598)	
Holyrood Abbey, Edinburgh, Scotland	Holyrood Abbey, Edinburgh	Henry Stuart, Lord Darnley (1567)	
Church of St John, Mirow, Germany	Church of St John, Mirow	Princess Augusta of Cambridge (1916)	
Old Minster, Winchester	Winchester Cathedral	Ælfgifu; Emma of Normandy (1052; bones now thought to be in one of the six mortuary caskets in Winchester Cathedral)	
Canterbury Cathedral	Canterbury Cathedral	Edward the Black Prince (1376)	
Tewkesbury Abbey	Tewkesbury Abbey	Edward of Westminster, Prince of Wales (1471)	
Worcester Cathedral	Worcester Cathedral	Arthur, Prince of Wales (1502)	
New Minster, Winchester		Ealhswith (902)	
Shaftesbury Abbey	Shaftesbury Abbey	Ælfgifu of Shaftesbury (944)	
Abbey of Sainte-Trinité, Caen, France	Abbey of Sainte-Trinité	Matilda of Flanders (1083)	
Le Mans Cathedral, Le Mans, France	Le Mans Cathedral	Geoffrey V of Anjou (1151)	
Faversham Abbey	Faversham Abbey	Matilda I, Countess of Boulogne (1152) Eustace IV, Count of Boulogne (1153)	
Rouen Cathedral, Normandy, France	Rouen Cathedral	Henry the Young King (1183)	
Crusader Cathedral of Tyre		Margaret of France, Queen of England and Hungary (1197)	
Fontevraud Abbey, Chinon, France		Eleanor of Aquitaine (1204) Isabella of Angoulême (1246)	
L'Épau Abbey, Le Mans, France	L'Épau Abbey	Berengaria of Navarre (1230)	
Amesbury Priory	Blue plaque marking the site of the London Greyfriars	Eleanor of Provence (1291; heart buried at Greyfriars, London)	
Christ Church Greyfriars	Christ Church Greyfriars	Margaret of France, Queen of England (1318; tomb destroyed during the Reformation) Isabella of France (1358)	
Greyfriars, Stamford, Lincolnshire		Joan of Kent (1386)	
Couvent des Célestins, Paris, France		Isabella of Valois (1409; remains lost during the French Revolution)	
Canterbury Cathedral	Canterbury Cathedral	Joan of Navarre, Queen of England (1437)	
Angers Cathedral	Angers Cathedral	Margaret of Anjou (1482; remains lost during the French Revolution)	
Nieuwe Kerk, Delft, The Netherlands	Nieuwe Kerk	Anne, Princess Royal and Princess of Orange (1759)	
Ludwigsburg Palace, Germany	Schloss Ludwigsberg	Charlotte, Princess Royal (1828)	
Church of Peace, Potsdam, Germany	Friedenskirche	Victoria, Princess Royal (1901)	
All Saints' Church, Harewood	All Saints' Church	Mary, Princess Royal and Countess of Harewood (1965) Henry Lascelles, 6th Earl of Harewood (1947) George Lascelles, 7th Earl of Harewood (2011)	
St Baglan's Church, Llanfaglan	St Baglan's Church	Antony Armstrong-Jones, 1st Earl of Snowdon (2017)	
Akershus Fortress, Oslo, Norway	Akershus Fortress	Maud of Wales (1938)	

== Sources ==
- Burial Places of the Kings & Queens of Britain britannia.com (Accessed 20 June 2007 – NB contains errors)
