= Infanta Francisca Josefa of Portugal =

Portuguese infanta (1699–1736)

Francisca Josefa
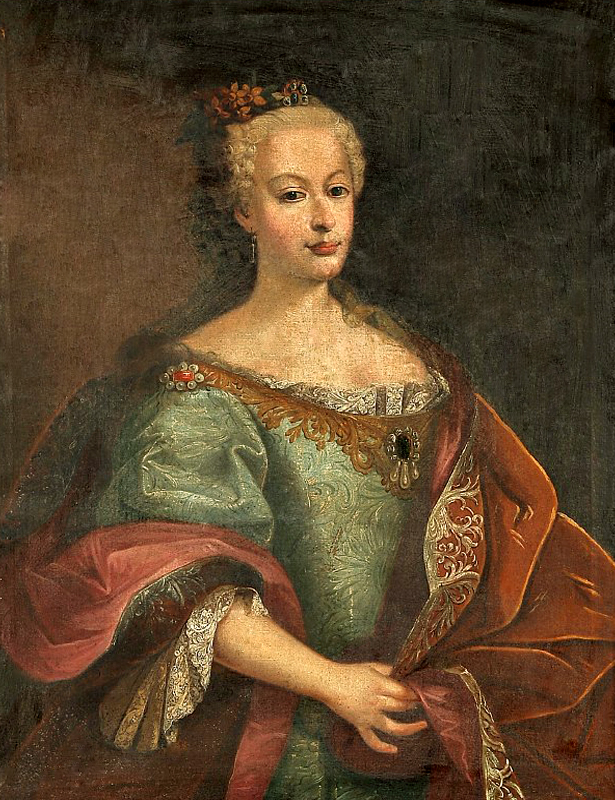
- Born: 30 January 1699; Ribeira Palace, Lisbon, Portugal
- Died: 15 July 1736 (aged 37); Ribeira Palace, Lisbon, Portugal
- Burial: Pantheon of the House of Braganza, Lisbon, Portugal
- House: Braganza
- Father: Peter II of Portugal
- Mother: Maria Sophia of Neuburg

Infanta Francisca Josefa Maria Xaviera(Portuguese pronunciation: [fɾɐ̃ˈsiʃkɐ ʒuˈzɛfɐ]; English: Frances Josepha) (30 January 1699 – 15 July 1736) was a Portuguese infanta (princess) and the last of eight children of King Peter II of Portugal and his second wife Marie Sophie of Neuburg.

Francisca Josefa was born and died in Lisbon. Charles Emmanuel III of Sardinia was proposed as a possible marriage for the infanta in 1720–21, but nothing came of it. She never married nor had issue and she died when she was 37 years old. She is buried at the Royal Pantheon of the Braganza Dynasty.

== Ancestry ==
Ancestors of Infanta Francisca Josefa of Portugal

8. Teodósio II, Duke of Braganza
4. John IV of Portugal
9. Ana de Velasco y Girón
2. Peter II of Portugal
10. Manuel, 8th Duke of Medina Sidonia
5. Luisa de Guzmán
11. Juana de Sandoval y de la Cerda
1. Francisca Josefa of Braganza
12. Wolfgang William, Count Palatine of Neuburg
6. Philip William, Elector Palatine
13. Magdalene of Bavaria
3. Maria Sophia of Neuburg
14. George II, Landgrave of Hesse-Darmstadt
7. Elisabeth Amalie of Hesse-Darmstadt
15. Sophia Eleonore of Saxony

== Bibliography ==
- Raggi, Giuseppina (2019). "The Lost Opportunity: Two Projects of Filippo Juvarra Concerning Royal Theaters and the Marriage Policy between the Courts of Turin and Lisbon (1719-1722)". Music in Art: International Journal for Music Iconography. 44 (1–2): 119–137. ISSN 1522-7464.
