= Joana, Princess of Beira =

Joana
- Princess of Beira
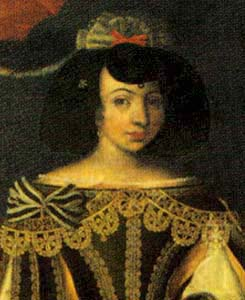
- Born: 18 September 1636; Ducal Palace of Vila Viçosa, Vila Viçosa, Portugal
- Died: 17 November 1653 (aged 18); Ribeira Palace, Lisbon, Portugal
- Burial: Pantheon of the House of Braganza
- House: Braganza
- Father: John IV of Portugal
- Mother: Luisa de Guzmán

Joana, Princess of Beira (18 September 1636 – 17 November 1653; Portuguese pronunciation: [ʒuˈɐnɐ]; English: Joan) was a Portuguese infanta (princess), and the eldest surviving daughter of John IV, King of Portugal (the first of the House of Braganza) and his wife Luisa de Guzmán.

== Life ==
Joana was born in Vila Viçosa on 18 September 1636. Her father created her Princess of Beira, a title subsequently used by the eldest daughter of the monarch. She died unmarried in Lisbon at the age of 18 on 17 November 1653. She was first buried at the Jerónimos Monastery and then moved to the Monastery of São Vicente de Fora.

== Ancestry ==
Ancestors of Joana, Princess of Beira

8. João, 6th Duke of Braganza
4. Teodósio, 7th Duke of Braganza
9. Catherine of Portugal
2. John IV of Portugal
10. Juan, 5th Duke of Frías
5. Ana de Velasco y Girón
11. María Téllez-Girón y Guzmán
1. Joana, Princess of Beira
12. Alonso, 7th Duke of Medina Sidonia
6. Manuel, 8th Duke of Medina Sidonia
13. Ana de Silva y Mendoza
3. Luisa de Guzmán
14. Francisco, 1st Duke of Lerma
7. Juana de Sandoval y la Cerda
15. Catalina de la Cerda y Portugal

== Sources ==
- Mendes, Paula Almeida (2020). "The exaltation of the "holines" of the Braganca dynasty as a legitimating strategy in the seventeenth century". In Rodrigues, Ana Maria S. A.; Silva, Manuela Santos; Spangler, Jonathan (eds.). Dynastic change : legitimacy and gender in medieval and early modern monarchy. Routledge.
- Newitt, Malyn (2019). The Braganzas: The Rise and Fall of the Ruling Dynasties of Portugal and Brazil, 1640-1910. Reaktion Books.

Joana, Princess of Beira House of Braganza Cadet branch of the House of Aviz Born: 18 September 1635 Died: 17 November 1653
Portuguese royalty
New Creation	Princess of Beira; 1645–1653	Succeeded by Catherine
