= Infante Carlos of Portugal =

Portuguese prince

Infante Carlos
- Born: 2 May 1716; Ribeira Palace, Lisbon, Kingdom of Portugal
- Died: 30 March 1736 (aged 19); Ribeira Palace, Lisbon, Kingdom of Portugal
- Burial: Royal Pantheon of the House of Braganza, Lisbon, Portugal
Names
- Carlos João Manuel Alexandre de Bragança
- House: House of Braganza
- Father: John V of Portugal
- Mother: Maria Anna of Austria

Infante Carlos of Portugal (Carlos João Manuel Alexandre; Portuguese pronunciation: [ˈkaɾluʃ]; English: Charles John Emmanuel Alexander; 2 May 1716 – 30 March 1736) was a Portuguese infante, the fourth child of King John V of Portugal and his wife Maria Anna of Austria.

== Biography ==
Born on 2 May 1716 in the Ribeira Palace, in Lisbon, the infante was baptized on 7 June as Carlos João Manuel Alexandre de Bragança. From an early age, he showed poor health, suffering from various ailments. Nevertheless, he was an active young man and regarded as a genius. He was interested in history, arithmetic, geography and music, having regularly played a guitar, his favorite pastime.

His health problems were constant, which led to him regularly traveling to Cascais, where he stayed at the Palace of the Marquises of that village, to bathe on the beaches of Estoril.

He died in the same Palace where he was born on 30 March 1736, one month short of turning 20 years old, victim of high fever. He is buried in the Royal Pantheon of the House of Braganza.
