= Pantheon of the House of Braganza =

Building in Lisbon, Lisbon District, Portugal

Coordinates: 38°42′53″N 9°07′37″W

Panteão da Casa de Bragança Panteão dos Bragança
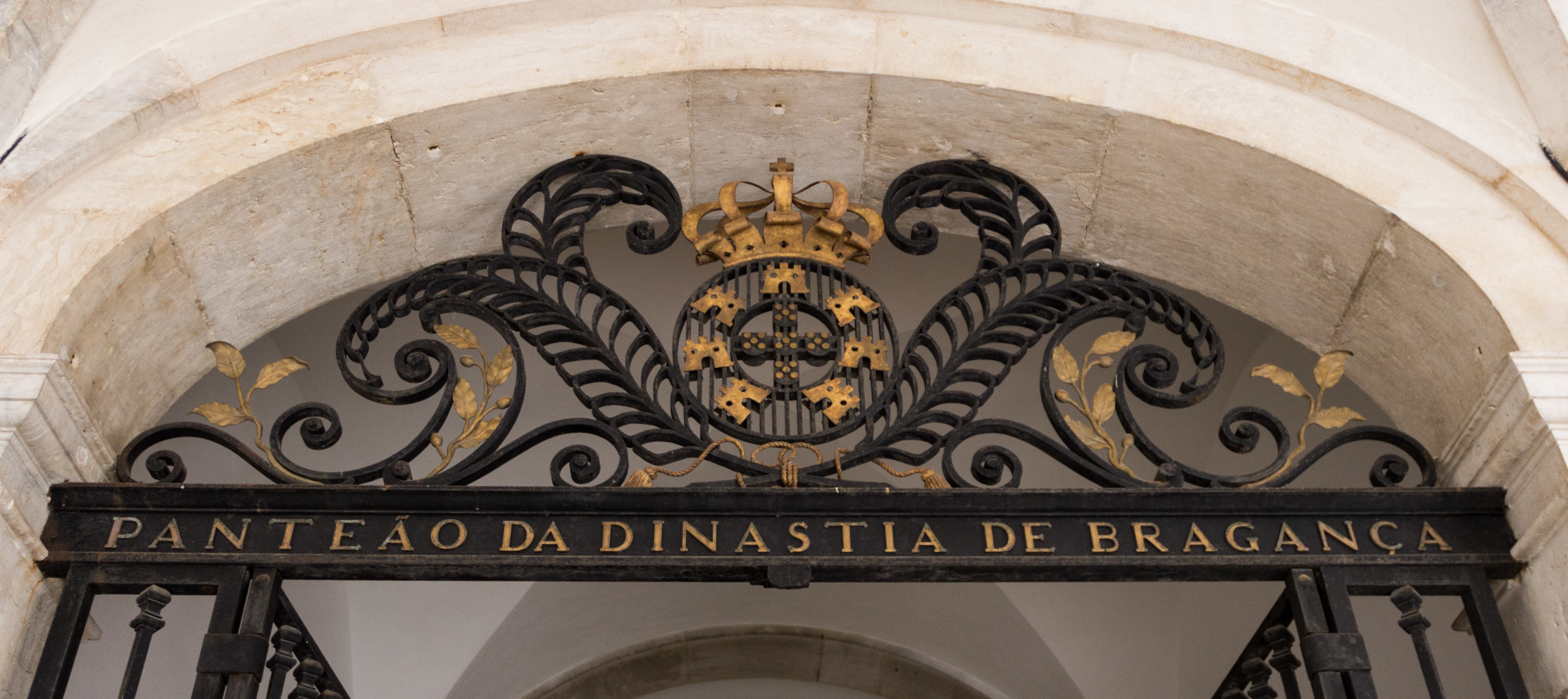
- Inscription over the entrance to the pantheon.

Location
- Location: Monastery of São Vicente de Fora
- Interactive map of Panteão da Casa de Bragança; Panteão dos Bragança

Architecture
- Style: Mannerist, Baroque, Neoclassic
- Groundbreaking: 1834

The Pantheon of the House of Braganza (Portuguese: Panteão da Dinastia de Bragança), also known as the Pantheon of the Braganzas (Panteão dos Bragança), is the final resting place for many of the members of the House of Braganza, located in the Monastery of São Vicente de Fora in the Alfama district of Lisbon, Portugal. The pantheon's burials have included Portuguese monarchs, Brazilian monarchs, Carol II of Romania, queen consorts of Portugal, and notable Infantes of Portugal, among others.

== History ==
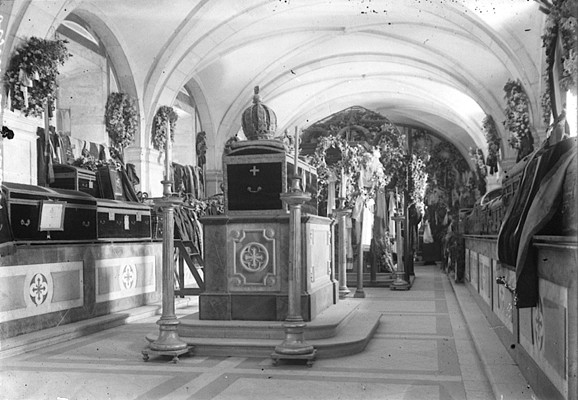
The pantheon in the early 20th century, before the Lisbon Regicide.

The Pantheon was created under orders from King Ferdinand II, transforming the old refectory of the monastery into the burial place it is today. The majority of the tombs are located on the sides of the pantheon, and are simple marble boxes with spaces of four tombs. If the tomb is of a monarch, it has a crown engraved in gold on the side of the tomb and a crown placed on top of the entire set of tombs. The tombs in the center aisle of the pantheon are those belonging to King Carlos I, Luís Filipe, Prince Royal, King Manuel II and Queen Amélie; the two martyrs of the Lisbon Regicide, the last King of Portugal and the last Queen consort of Portugal, respectively.

== Burials ==
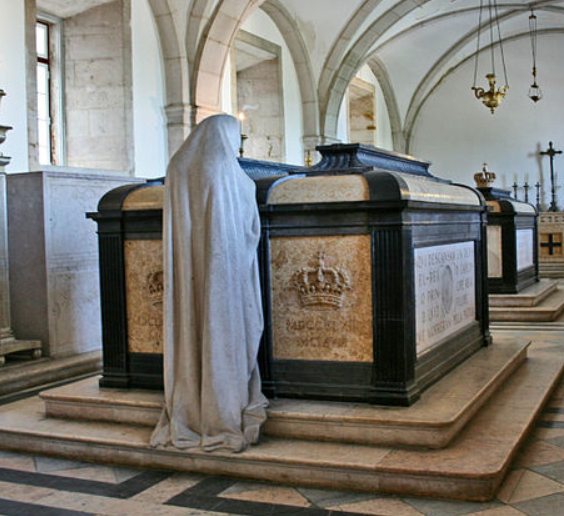
The twin tombs of King Carlos I of Portugal and Prince Royal Luís Filipe, who both died in the Lisbon Regicide.

=== Monarchs and consorts ===
- John IV of Portugal
- Luisa de Guzmán
- Afonso VI of Portugal
- Maria Francisca of Savoy
- Peter II of Portugal
- Maria Sophia of Neuburg
- John V of Portugal
- Maria Anna of Austria
- Joseph I of Portugal
- Mariana Victoria of Spain
- Peter III of Portugal
- John VI of Portugal
- Carlota Joaquina of Spain
- Maria II of Portugal
- Auguste, Duke of Leuchtenberg
- Ferdinand II of Portugal
- Miguel I of Portugal
- Adelaide of Löwenstein-Wertheim-Rosenberg (married Miguel after his deposition and the restoration of Queen Maria II)
- Pedro V of Portugal
- Stephanie of Hohenzollern-Sigmaringen
- Luís I of Portugal
- Carlos I of Portugal
- Amélie of Orléans
- Manuel II of Portugal

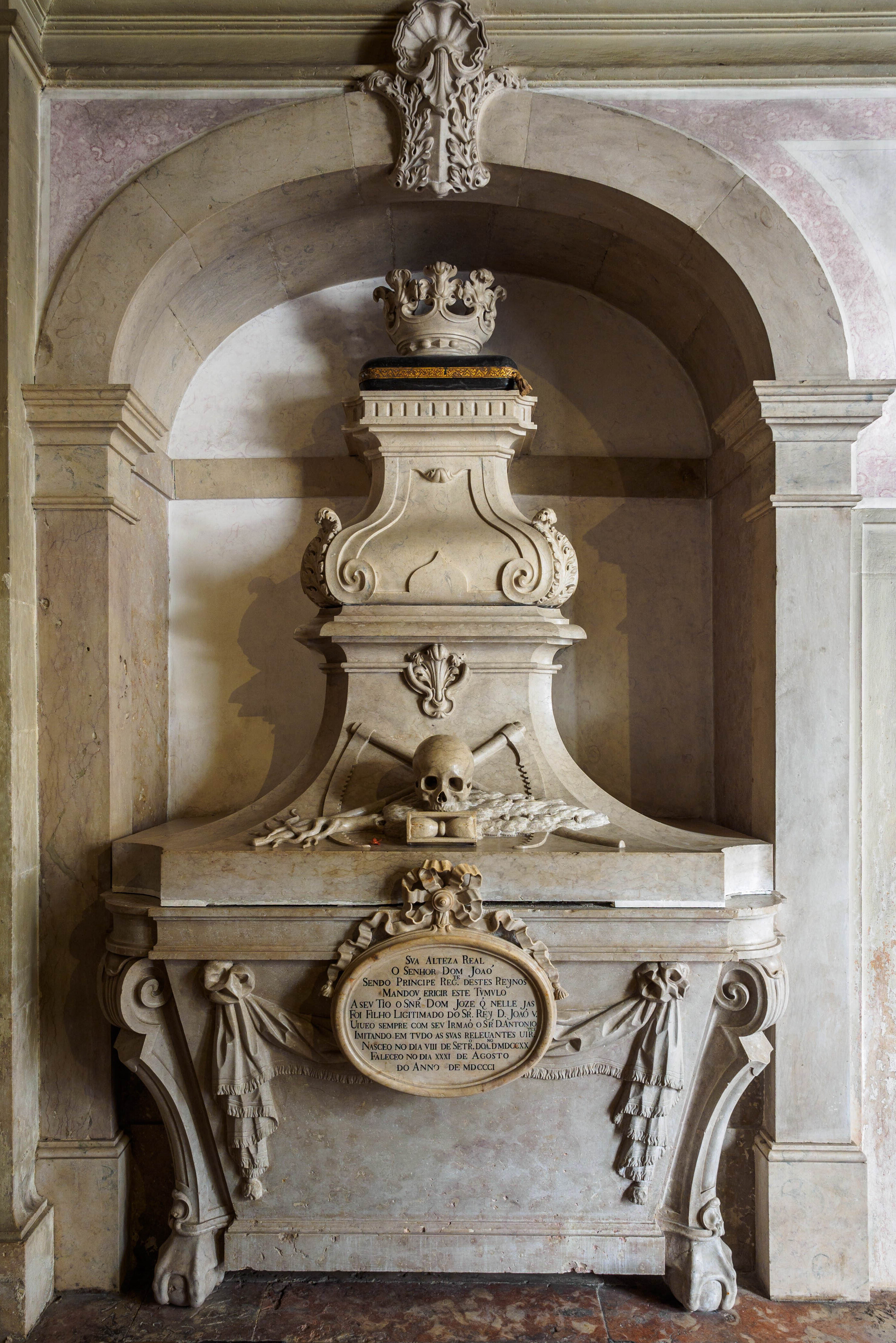
Tomb of José of Braganza, High Inquisitor of Portugal.

=== Notable princes and infantes ===
Children of King John IV

- Teodósio, Prince of Brazil, eldest son
- Joana, Princess of Beira, second daughter
- Catherine of Braganza, Queen of England, Scotland, and Ireland, third daughter

Children of King Pedro II

- João, Prince of Brazil, eldest son
- Infante Francisco, Duke of Beja, third son
- Infante António of Portugal, fourth son
- Infante Manuel, Count of Ourém, fifth son
- Isabel Luísa, Princess of Beira, eldest daughter
- Infanta Francisca Josefa of Portugal, fourth daughter

Children of King John V

- Pedro, Prince of Brazil, eldest son
- Infante Carlos of Portugal, third son
- Infante Alexandre of Portugal, fifth son
- José of Braganza, High Inquisitor of Portugal, illegitimate son

Children of King Joseph I

- Infanta Maria Ana Francisca of Portugal, second daughter
- Infanta Maria Doroteia of Portugal, third daughter
- Infanta Benedita of Portugal, fourth daughter

Children of Queen Maria I

- José, Prince of Brazil, eldest son

Children of King John VI

- Francisco António, Prince of Beira, eldest son
- Infanta Isabel Maria of Portugal, fourth daughter
- Infanta Maria da Assunção of Portugal, fifth daughter

Children of Queen Maria II

- Infante João, Duke of Beja, fourth child and third son
- Infante Fernando of Portugal, seventh child and fourth son
- Infante Augusto, Duke of Coimbra, eighth child and fifth son

Children of King Luís I

- Afonso, Duke of Porto, younger son, later Prince Royal of Portugal

Children of King Carlos I

- Luís Filipe, Prince Royal of Portugal, elder son

== Braganza monarchs and consorts not buried at the pantheon ==
All of the Braganza monarchs of Portugal are buried at the royal pantheon, from John IV (1603–1656) to Manuel II (1889–1932), except:

- Queen Maria I is buried in the Estrela Basilica in Lisbon. She died in 1816, while the royal court was in Rio de Janeiro, Brazil (due to the Napoleonic invasion of Portugal in 1807), and was initially buried at the Ajuda Convent in Rio de Janeiro, but her remains were brought to Lisbon after the return of the royal family to Portugal.
- King Pedro IV, also Emperor of Brazil as Pedro I, was initially buried in the Pantheon, but his remains were offered to Brazil in 1972 (to mark the 150th anniversary of the Brazilian Proclamation of Independence) and they were then buried at the Imperial Crypt and Chapel within the Monument to the Independence of Brazil in São Paulo, Brazil. His heart is interred in the Church of Our Lady of Lapa, in Porto, Portugal.
- Maria Leopoldina of Austria, who was Queen consort of Portugal during the brief reign of Pedro IV, is interred next to the remains of her husband at the Monument to the Independence of Brazil in São Paulo, Brazil. She became a Portuguese princess by marriage when she wed Pedro I and IV, then Prince Royal of the United Kingdom of Portugal, Brazil and the Algarves in 1817, while the Portuguese royal court was in Rio de Janeiro. She subsequently remained in Brazil with her husband, and became Empress consort of Brazil when Pedro proclaimed the independence of Brazil and was acclaimed Emperor of Brazil as Pedro I. When Pedro briefly held the Portuguese Crown as King Pedro IV from March to May, 1826, Empress Maria Leopoldina also became Queen consort of Portugal. She died in December 1826, and, before her remains were transferred to the Imperial Crypt and Chapel at the Monument to the Independence of Brazil in 1972, she was initially buried at the Imperial Mausoleum of St. Anthony's Convent in Rio de Janeiro.
- Maria Pia of Savoy, consort of King Luís I, having returned to her native Italy in her widowhood after the abolition of the Portuguese monarchy in 1910, is buried in the Pantheon of the House of Savoy in the Basilica of Superga in Turin, Italy.
- Augusta Victoria of Hohenzollern, consort of King Manuel II (the couple wed after his deposition and the abolition of the monarchy), is buried at Langenstein Castle, owned by the family of her second husband, Count Robert Douglas.

== Former burials ==
- Emperor Pedro II of Brazil, a member of the Brazilian branch of the House of Braganza and son of King Pedro IV, was buried in the Pantheon in 1891 and remained there until 1921 when his body was repatriated to Brazil, where it is currently buried at the Imperial Mausoleum of the Cathedral of St. Peter of Alcantara in Petrópolis. After the military coup d'état that proclaimed Brazil a republic on 15 November 1889 the Brazilian imperial family was sent into exile, and were received and given protection by their Braganza cousins who still reigned in Portugal. After the death of his wife, Empress Teresa Cristina, on 28 December 1889, Pedro II decided to move to France, and settled in Paris, where he died on 5 December 1891. After a state funeral hosted by the French government at the Church of La Madeleine in Paris, his body was moved by train to Portugal, and was solemnly buried at the Braganza Pantheon. After the 1920 revocation of the decree that banished the imperial family from Brazil, the Emperor's body was returned to Brazil, and a Brazilian state funeral for the former Emperor was finally held in 1921, on the occasion of the provisional reburial of his remains at the then Metropolitan Cathedral of Rio de Janeiro. In 1939, the construction of a mausoleum at Petrópolis Cathedral, intended to serve as the Emperor's final resting place, was completed, and his remains were again solemnly transferred and reburied there.
- Teresa Cristina of the Two Sicilies, wife of the deposed Brazilian emperor Pedro II and therefore a member of the House of Braganza by marriage, was buried in the Pantheon from her death in December 1889 (shortly after the coup d'état that proclaimed Brazil a republic and sent the imperial family into exile), until 1921, when her remains were returned to Brazil together with those of her husband. At present her body rests at the Imperial Mausoleum in the Cathedral of St. Peter of Alcantara in Petrópolis.
- Amélie of Leuchtenberg, another member of the House of Braganza by marriage, second wife of Emperor Pedro I of Brazil (Pedro had reigned as King Pedro IV of Portugal but the couple wed after his abdication of the Portuguese Crown) and Duchess of Braganza (as wife and later as widow of the Duke of Braganza, the title that her husband assumed after his abdication of the Brazilian Crown), remained in Portugal during her widowhood and was buried in the Pantheon from her death in 1873 until 1982, when her remains were ceded to Brazil and transferred to the Imperial Crypt and Chapel at the Monument to the Independence of Brazil in São Paulo.
- Princess Maria Amélia of Brazil, also a member of the House of Braganza, King Pedro IV's only child from his second marriage, conceived after his abdication of the Portuguese Crown, and born in Europe after his abdication of the Brazilian Crown, was buried in the Pantheon from her moving from Madeira a few months after her death in 1853 until 1982, when her remains were ceded to Brazil and transferred to the Imperial Mausoleum at St. Anthony's Convent in Rio de Janeiro, where they are buried alongside the remains of several other princes and princesses descended from the Emperors of Brazil.
- King Carol II of Romania, a great-grandson of Maria II and Ferdinand II who died in Portugal while in exile, and his wife Magda Lupescu (the couple were married after his abdication of the Romanian Crown) were buried in the pantheon before the return of their bodies to Romania in 2003. They are now buried in the Orthodox Curtea de Argeș Cathedral, alongside other Romanian royals.

== See also ==
- Monastery of São Vicente de Fora
- List of Portuguese monarchs

== Sources ==
- Dias, Paulo (2006). Real Panteão dos Bragança: arte e memória. Antília Editora. ISBN 972-99612-9-8.
- Royal Pantheon of the Braganza Dynasty (In Portuguese)
- History of the Royal Pantheon of the Braganza Dynasty (In Portuguese)
