= List of Portuguese royal consorts =

Spouses of Portuguese monarchs

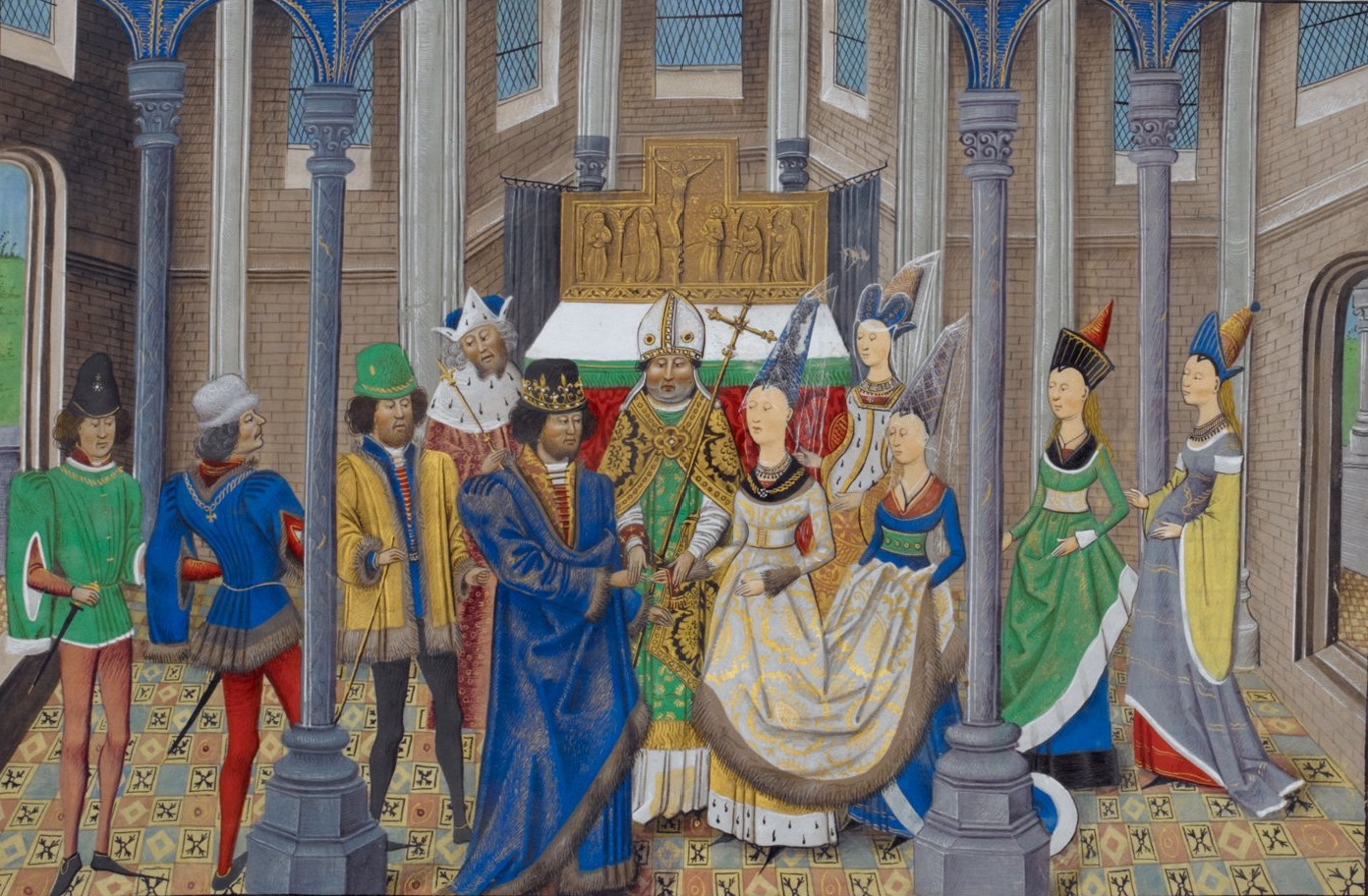
John I's marriage to Philippa of Lancaster

Portugal had only two queens regnant: Maria I and Maria II (and, arguably, two more: Beatriz for a short period of time in the 14th century; and Teresa, in the 12th century, which technically makes her the first ruler and first queen of Portugal). The other queens were queens consort, wives of the Portuguese kings. Many of them were highly influential in the country's history, either ruling as regents for their minor children or having a great influence over their spouses.

The husband of a Portuguese queen regnant could only be titled king after the birth of any child from that marriage. Portugal had two princes consort – Auguste de Beauharnais, 2nd Duke of Leuchtenberg and Ferdinand of Saxe-Coburg and Gotha – both consorts to Maria II. The first one died leaving his wife childless, and therefore never became king. Maria II's second husband was a prince until the birth of their first child, Pedro V. At that point he became jure uxoris king. Maria I's husband, Pedro III, was king automatically after his wife's accession because the couple already had children.

== House of Burgundy ==
Picture	Name	Father	Birth	Marriage	Became Consort	Ceased to be Consort	Death	Spouse
	Maud of Savoy	Amadeus III, Count of Savoy (Savoy)	1125	January/June 1146		4 November 1157		Afonso I
	Dulce of Aragon	Ramon Berenguer IV, Count of Barcelona (Barcelona)	1160	1174–5	6 December 1185 husband's accession	1 September 1198		Sancho I
	Urraca of Castile	Alfonso VIII of Castile (Ivrea)	1186 – 28 May 1187	1206	26 March 1212 husband's accession	3 November 1220		Afonso II
	Mécia Lopes de Haro	Lope Díaz II de Haro (Haro)	1215	1246		4 January 1248 husband's death	1270	Sancho II
	Matilda II, Countess of Boulogne	Renaud I, Count of Dammartin	1202	1235	4 January 1248 husband's accession	1253 divorce	14 January 1259, 1260, or 1262	Afonso III
	Beatrice of Castile	Alfonso X of Castile (Ivrea)	1242	1253		16 February 1279 husband's death	27 October 1303	Afonso III
	Elizabeth of Aragon	Peter III of Aragon (Barcelona)	4 January 1271	2 February/24 June 1282		7 January 1325 husband's death	4 July 1336	Dinis I
	Beatrice of Castile	Sancho IV of Castile (Ivrea)	8 March 1293	12 September 1309	7 January 1325 husband's accession	28 May 1357 husband's death	25 October 1359	Afonso IV
	Inês de Castro	Pedro Fernández de Castro (Castro)	1325–7	1346 secretly 1 January 1354 openly	-		7 January 1355	Pedro I
	Leonor Teles	Martim Afonso Telo de Meneses	c. 1350	May 1372		22 October 1383 husband's death	c. 1405/06	Fernando I

== House of Aviz ==
Picture	Name	Father	Birth	Marriage	Became Consort	Ceased to be Consort	Death	Spouse
	Philippa of Lancaster	John of Gaunt, 1st Duke of Lancaster (Lancaster)	31 March 1360	11 February 1387		19 July 1415		João I
	Eleanor of Aragon	Ferdinand I of Aragon (Trastámara)	2 May 1402	22 September 1428	14 August 1433 husband's accession	9 September 1438 husband's death	19 February 1445	Duarte I
	Isabella of Coimbra	Peter, Duke of Coimbra (Aviz)	1 March 1432	6 May 1447		2 December 1455		Afonso V
	Joanna la Beltraneja	Henry IV of Castile (Trastámara)	21 February 1462	30 May 1475		1479 divorce	12 April 1530	Afonso V
	Eleanor of Viseu	Ferdinand, Duke of Viseu (Aviz)	2 May 1458	22 January 1471	28 August 1481 husband's accession	25 October 1495 husband's death	17 November 1525	João II
	Isabella of Aragon	Ferdinand II of Aragon (Trastámara)	2 October 1470	30 September 1497		28 August 1498		Manuel I
	Maria of Aragon	Ferdinand II of Aragon (Trastámara)	29 June 1482	30 October 1500		7 March 1517		Manuel I
	Eleanor of Austria	Philip I of Castile (Habsburg)	15 November 1498	16 July 1518		13 December 1521 husband's death	25 February 1558	Manuel I
	Catherine of Austria	Philip I of Castile (Habsburg)	14 January 1507	10 February 1525		11 June 1557 husband's death	12 February 1578	João III

== House of Habsburg ==
Picture	Name	Father	Birth	Marriage	Became Consort	Ceased to be Consort	Death	Spouse
	Anna of Austria	Maximilian II, Holy Roman Emperor (Habsburg)	2 November 1549	4 May 1570	12 September 1580 husband's accession	26 October 1580		Filipe I
	Margaret of Austria	Charles II of Austria (Habsburg)	25 December 1584	18 April 1599		3 October 1611		Filipe II
	Elisabeth of France	Henry IV of France (Bourbon)	22 November 1602	25 November 1615	31 March 1621 husband's accession	1 December 1640 husband's deposition	6 October 1644	Filipe III

== House of Braganza ==
Picture	Name	Father	Birth	Marriage	Became Consort	Ceased to be Consort	Death	Spouse
	Luisa de Guzmán	Juan Manuel Pérez de Guzmán, 8th Duke of Medina Sidonia (Guzmán)	13 October 1613	12 January 1633	1 December 1640 husband's accession	6 November 1656 husband's death	27 February 1666	João IV
	Maria Francisca of Savoy	Charles Amadeus, Duke of Nemours (Savoy)	21 June 1646	2 August 1666		24 March 1668 divorce	27 December 1683	Afonso VI
	Maria Francisca of Savoy	Charles Amadeus, Duke of Nemours (Savoy)	21 June 1646	1668	12 September 1683 husband's accession	27 December 1683		Pedro II
	Maria Sophia of Neuburg	Philip William, Elector Palatine (Wittelsbach)	6 August 1666	11 August 1687		4 August 1699		Pedro II
	Maria Anna of Austria	Leopold I, Holy Roman Emperor (Habsburg)	7 September 1683	27 October 1708		31 July 1750 husband's death	14 August 1754	João V
	Mariana Victoria of Spain	Philip V of Spain (Bourbon)	31 March 1718	19 January 1729	31 July 1750 husband's accession	24 February 1777 husband's death	15 January 1781	José I
	Carlota Joaquina of Spain	Charles IV of Spain (Bourbon)	25 April 1775	8 May 1785	20 March 1816 husband's accession	10 March 1826 husband's death	7 January 1830	João VI
	Maria Leopoldina of Austria	Francis II, Holy Roman Emperor (Habsburg-Lorraine)	22 January 1797	6 November 1817	26 March 1826 husband's accession	2 May 1826 husband's abdication	11 December 1826	Pedro IV
	Auguste de Beauharnais, 2nd Duke of Leuchtenberg	Eugène de Beauharnais, 1st Duke of Leuchtenberg (Beauharnais)	9 December 1810	1 December 1834 by proxy 26 January 1835 in person		28 March 1835		Maria II
	Ferdinand of Saxe-Coburg and Gotha	Prince Ferdinand of Saxe-Coburg and Gotha (Saxe-Coburg and Gotha)	29 October 1816	1 January 1836		16 September 1837 became King	15 December 1885	Maria II

== House of Braganza-Saxe-Coburg and Gotha ==
Picture	Name	Father	Birth	Marriage	Became Consort	Ceased to be Consort	Death	Spouse
	Stephanie of Hohenzollern-Sigmaringen	Karl Anton, Prince of Hohenzollern (Hohenzollern-Sigmaringen)	15 July 1837	18 May 1858		17 July 1859		Pedro V
	Maria Pia of Savoy	Victor Emmanuel II of Italy (Savoy)	16 October 1847	6 October 1862		19 October 1889 husband's death	5 July 1911	Luís I
	Amélie of Orléans	Prince Philippe, Count of Paris (Orléans)	28 September 1865	22 May 1886	19 October 1889 husband's accession	1 February 1908 husband's death	25 October 1951	Carlos I

== See also ==
Media related to Queens of Portugal at Wikimedia Commons

- List of Portuguese monarchs
