= Francisco António, Prince of Beira =

Francisco António
- Prince of Beira, Duke of Barcelos (more...)
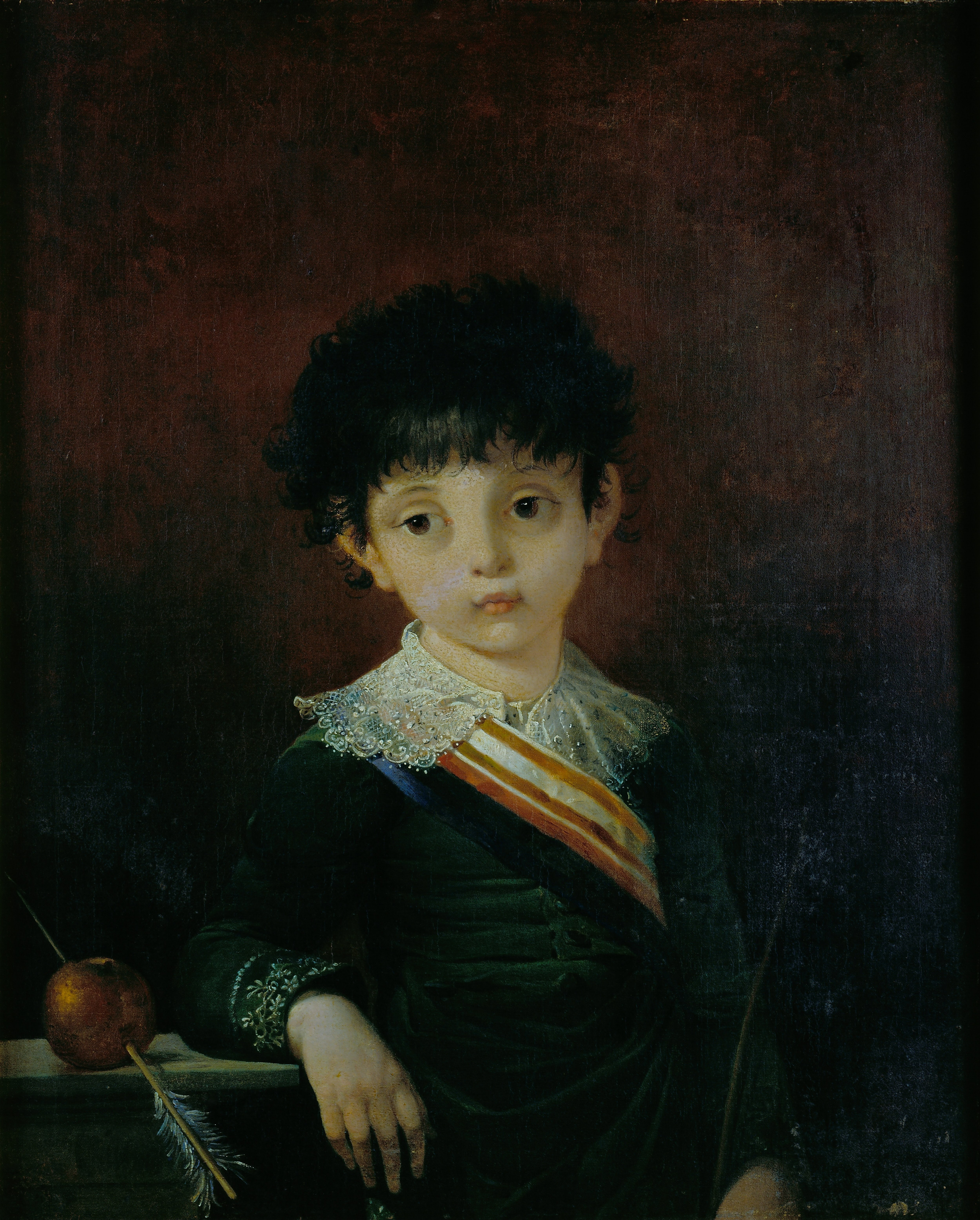
- Portrait, c. 1816
- Born: 21 March 1795; Queluz Royal Palace
- Died: 11 June 1801 (aged 6); Queluz Royal Palace
- Burial: Royal Pantheon of the House of Braganza
Names
- Francisco António Pio de Bragança
- House: House of Braganza
- Father: John, Prince of Brazil (later John VI)
- Mother: Carlota Joaquina of Spain

Dom Francisco Antonio of Braganza, Prince of Beira (21 March 1795 – 11 June 1801) was the first son of D. João Maria and D. Carlota Joaquina, the Prince and Princess of Brazil.

The Prince was born on 21 March 1795, and was titled the Prince of Beira and the Duke of Barcelos, as heir-apparent to the heir-apparent of the throne of Portugal. Antonio Francisco died on 11 June 1801, at the age of six, passing his title as Prince of Beira to his younger brother, the Infante D. Pedro de Alcântara.

== Honours ==
- Knight of the Order of the Golden Fleece (Kingdom of Spain).

== See also ==
- Descendants of John VI of Portugal
