= Maria Sophia of Neuburg =

Queen of Portugal from 1687 to 1699

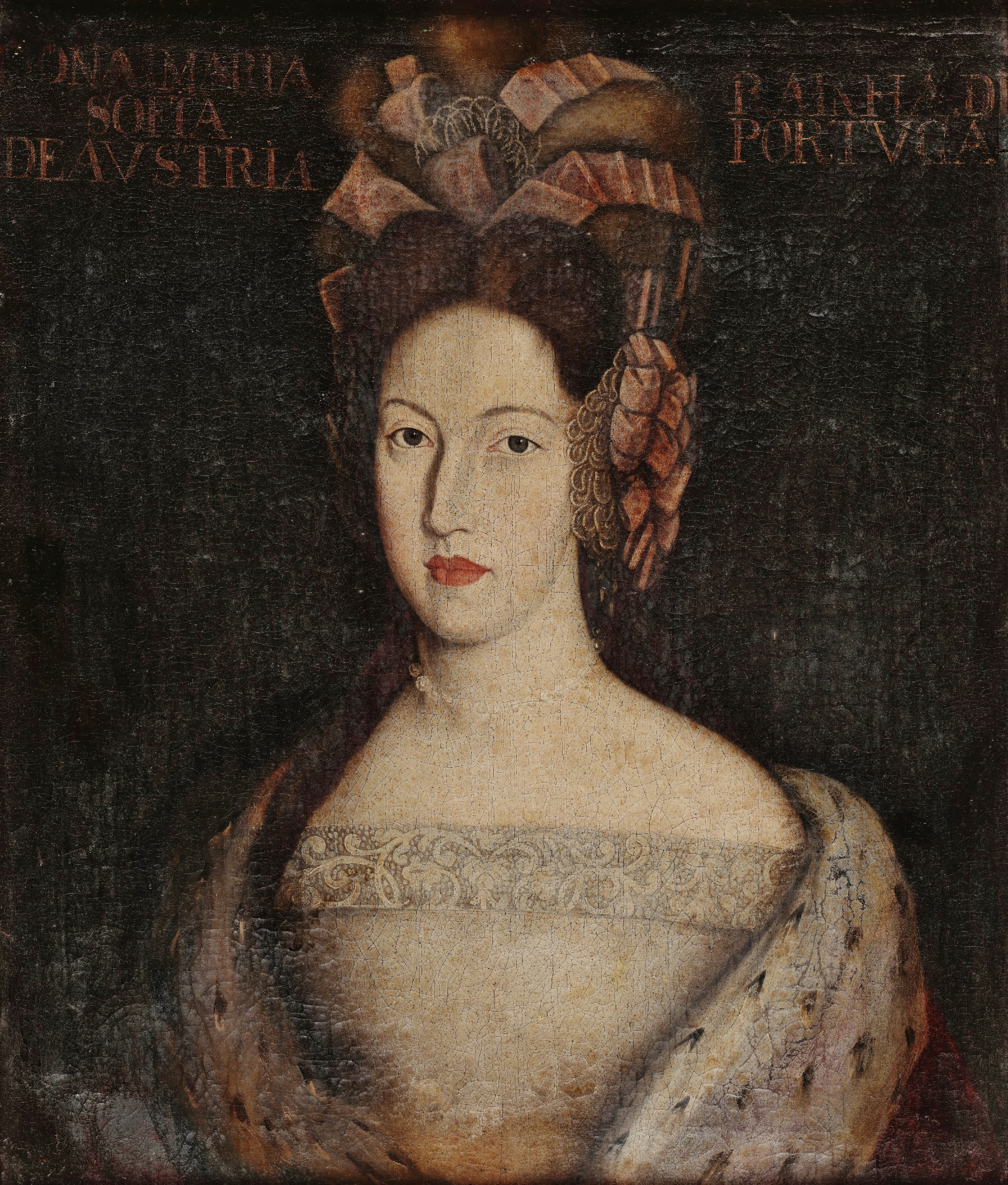
- Portrait by António de Oliveira de Loredo, c. 1690s

Queen consort of Portugal
- Tenure: 11 August 1687 – 4 August 1699
- Born: 6 August 1666; Schloss Benrath, Düsseldorf, Palatinate-Neuburg, Holy Roman Empire
- Died: 4 August 1699 (aged 32); Ribeira Palace, Lisbon, Portugal
- Burial: Pantheon of the House of Braganza, Lisbon, Portugal
- Spouse: Peter II of Portugal (m. 1687)
- Issue more...: João, Prince of Brazil; John V; Infante Francisco, Duke of Beja; Infante António; Infante Manuel, Count of Ourém; Infanta Francisca Josefa
Names
- German: Maria Sophie Elisabeth; Portuguese: Maria Sofia Isabel
- House: Wittelsbach
- Father: Philip William, Elector Palatine
- Mother: Elisabeth Amalie of Hesse-Darmstadt

Maria Sophia Elisabeth of Neuburg (6 August 1666 – 4 August 1699) was Queen of Portugal as the wife of King Peter II from 1687 until her death in 1699. A popular queen, she was noted for her extraordinary generosity and for being the mother of the famously extravagant John V of Portugal.

== Life ==
=== Early life ===
Maria Sophia was born at the Schloss Benrath outside Düsseldorf in the Holy Roman Empire what is now Germany. Her father Philip William was the reigning Count Palatine of Neuburg. In 1685 he became Elector Palatine following the death of his cousin Charles II, an inheritance that greatly increased the family's status within Europe. In December 1676, Maria Sophia's sister Eleonore Magdalene was married to Holy Roman Emperor Leopold I owing to the family's reputation as producing fertile women. After two marriages, Leopold had no living male heirs. The new Empress Eleonore Magdalene fulfilled her function and quickly mothered two future Holy Roman Emperors (Joseph I and Charles VI).

A similar succession crisis was occurring in Portugal. Isabel Luísa, Princess of Beira, heiress to the throne and only daughter of King Peter II, was childless and had been refused by most European sovereigns due to her sickly nature and strict Portuguese succession rights. As a result, the Portuguese ambassador Manuel da Silva Teles was sent to Heidelberg to ask for the hand of Maria Sophia, with the encouragement of Empress Eleonore Magdalene. The embassy left Lisbon on 8 December 1686 and the marriage contract was signed on 22 May 1687. A dowry of 100,000 florins was agreed on.

=== Queen ===
Portrait by Félix da Costa, c. 1687–99

Following her proxy marriage on 2 July 1687 in Heidelberg, Maria Sophia left her native Germany the following August. She travelled up the Rhine to receive the honours of all courts along the river. At Brila, Maria Sophia embarked on an English yacht that was put at her disposal by order of James II of England. She was accompanied by an English fleet that travelled to Plymouth with the Duke of Grafton, son of the late Charles II of England. The new queen arrived in Lisbon 12 August 1687 amid great celebration and the same day the couple was formally married by the Archbishop of Lisbon at Ribeira Palace. Supposedly Louis XIV was "greatly chagrined" by Peter's decision to marry a daughter of the Elector Palatine and not a French princess, as he had hoped.

Described as courteous and sweet-natured, Maria Sophia quickly gained the affection of Peter and her stepdaughter Isabel Luísa. She was also very close with her sister-in-law, Catherine of Braganza. Maria Sophia gave birth to a son, João, a year into her marriage. The son survived only three weeks, but a year later, the young queen had another son who would succeed his father as John V of Portugal. As an adult, he would marry his first cousin Maria Anna of Austria, daughter of Empress Eleonore Magdalene.

A popular queen, Maria Sophia was decidedly generous and set about helping the poor of Lisbon. She was frequently involved with charities that supported widows and orphans and allowed poor patients access to medical care at the royal palace. Maria Sophia's piety also contributed to her popularity. She had a very intimate friendship with Father Bartolomeu do Quental, who died with the reputation of a saint. In Beja, she financed the foundation of a Franciscan school.

Maria Sophia died in Lisbon of fever, possibly a symptom of erysipelas, on 4 August 1699, two days before her thirty-third birthday. Her body was laid to rest at the Monastery of São Vicente de Fora in Lisbon.

== Issue ==
Name	Portrait	Lifespan	Notes
João		30 August 1688 – 17 September 1688	Prince of Brazil and 12th Duke of Braganza, lived eighteen days.
João		22 October 1689 – 31 July 1750	Prince of Brazil from 1697; and King of Portugal. Married Maria Anna of Austria, and had issue.
Francisco		25 May 1691 – 21 July 1742	Duke of Beja, died unmarried with illegitimate issue.
Antonio		15 March 1695 – 20 October 1757	Died unmarried and childless.
Teresa Maria		24 February 1696 – 16 February 1704	Died in childhood.
Manuel		3 August 1697 – 3 August 1766	Count of Ourém, died unmarried.
Francisca Josefa		30 January 1699 – 15 July 1736	Died unmarried and childless.

== Ancestry ==
Ancestors of Maria Sophia of Neuburg

16. Wolfgang, Count Palatine of Zweibrücken
8. Philip Louis, Count Palatine of Neuburg
17. Landgravine Anna of Hesse
4. Wolfgang Wilhelm, Count Palatine of Neuburg
18. William, Duke of Jülich-Cleves-Berg
9. Duchess Anna of Cleves
19. Archduchess Maria of Austria
2. Philipp Wilhelm, Elector Palatine
20. Albert V, Duke of Bavaria
10. William V, Duke of Bavaria
21. Archduchess Anna of Austria
5. Duchess Magdalene of Bavaria
22. Francis I, Duke of Lorraine
11. Duchess Renata of Lorraine
23. Princess Christina of Denmark and Norway
1. Maria Sophia of Neuburg
24. George I, Landgrave of Hesse-Darmstadt
12. Louis V, Landgrave of Hesse-Darmstadt
25. Countess Magdalene of Lippe
6. George II, Landgrave of Hesse-Darmstadt
26. John George, Elector of Brandenburg
13. Margravine Magdalena of Brandenburg
27. Princess Elisabeth of Anhalt-Zerbst
3. Elisabeth Amalie of Hesse-Darmstadt
28. Christian I, Elector of Saxony
14. John George I, Elector of Saxony
29. Margravine Sophie of Brandenburg
7. Princess Sophia Eleonore of Saxony
30. Albert Frederick, Duke of Prussia
15. Duchess Magdalene Sibylle of Prussia
31. Duchess Marie Eleonore of Cleves

Maria Sophia of Neuburg House of Wittelsbach Born: 6 August 1666 Died: 4 August 1699
Portuguese royalty
Preceded by Maria Francisca of Savoy	Queen consort of Portugal; 1687–1699	Vacant Title next held by Maria Anna of Austria
