= Maria Anna of Austria =

Queen of Portugal from 1708 to 1750

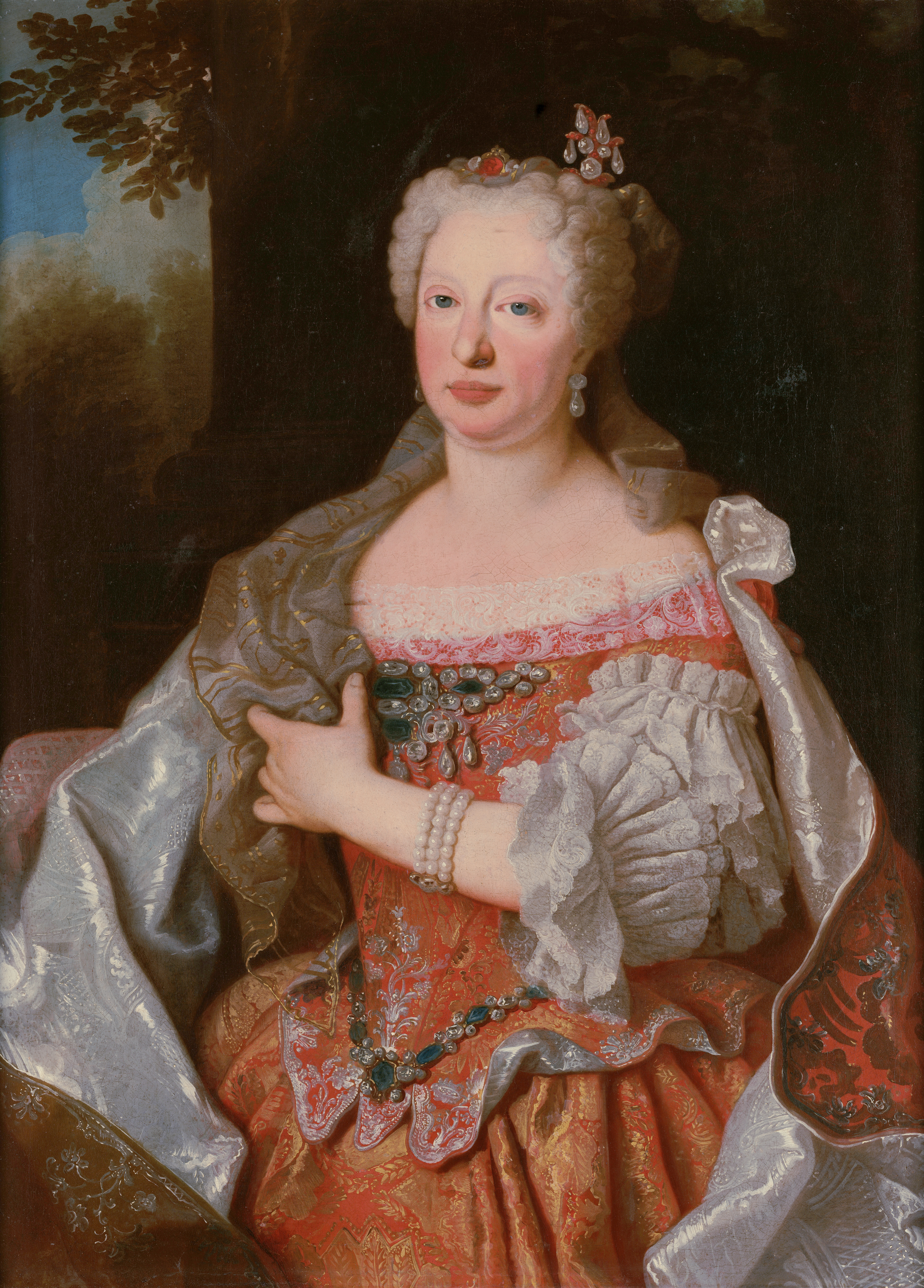
- Portrait by Jean Ranc, 1729

Queen consort of Portugal
- Tenure: 27 October 1708 – 31 July 1750
- Born: 7 September 1683; Linz, Archduchy of Austria, Holy Roman Empire
- Died: 14 August 1754 (aged 70); Palace of Belém, Lisbon, Kingdom of Portugal
- Burial: Imperial Crypt, Vienna (heart); Pantheon of the House of Braganza, Lisbon (body)
- Spouse: John V of Portugal (m. 1708; died 1750)
- Issue: Barbara, Queen of Spain; Pedro, Prince of Brazil; Joseph, King of Portugal; Infante Carlos; Peter III, King of Portugal; Infante Alexandre
Names
- Maria Anna Josepha Antonia Regina
- House: Habsburg
- Father: Leopold I, Holy Roman Emperor
- Mother: Eleonor Magdalene of Neuburg

Maria Anna of Austria (Maria Anna Josepha Antonia Regina; 7 September 1683 – 14 August 1754) was Queen of Portugal as the wife of King John V of Portugal. She served as the regent of Portugal from 1742 until 1750 during the illness of her husband. She was born an Archduchess of Austria as the daughter of Leopold I, Holy Roman Emperor and Eleonore Magdalene of Neuburg.

== Life ==
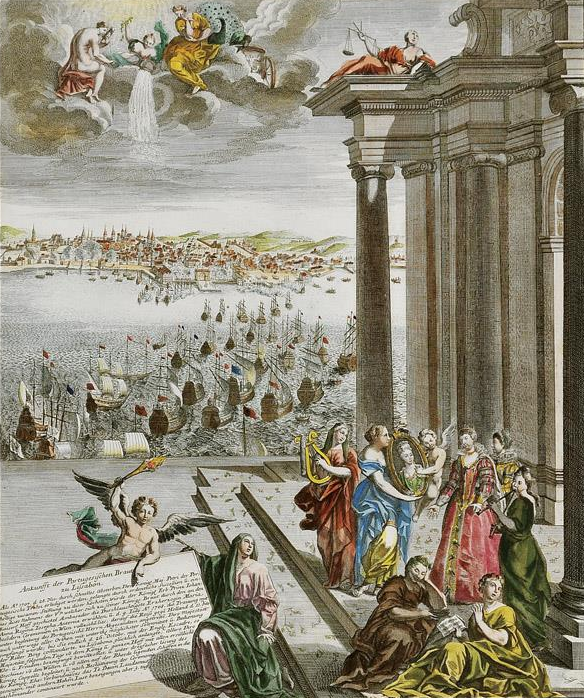
Maria Anna's arrival to Lisbon on Gottfried Stein's painting

=== Early life ===
Born Maria Anna Josepha Antonia Regina, she was the eleventh child and seventh daughter of Leopold I, Holy Roman Emperor (1640–1705) by his third wife, Eleonor Magdalene of Neuburg (1655–1720). Two of her brothers, Joseph and Charles later became emperors. Through Charles, she was an aunt of Maria Theresa, the only woman to ever rule the Habsburg monarchy in her own right.

=== Life as queen consort ===
On 27 October 1708, Maria Anna married John V, King of Portugal (1689–1750) to seal the alliance between the two countries against France and Spain during the War of Spanish Succession. They were first cousins, as their mothers were sisters. Maria Anna reformed the court and its customs to follow the traditions and customs of the traditional Queens of Portugal. One of her greatest impacts on the court and Portuguese nobility as a whole was the increase of segregation between men and women, as well as between servants and masters. Like John, Maria Anna was described to have an exuberant taste and was known for parties. She would invite the nobility from across the country and hold grand festivals, often lasting several days.

=== Regency ===
In 1742 Maria Anna became regent after her husband had suffered a stroke and became partially paralyzed. When John V died on 31 July 1750, their eldest son Joseph I of Portugal inherited the throne.

She died in the Belém Palace on 14 August 1754. After her death, she was buried in Lisbon, but her heart was brought to Vienna and buried there in the Imperial Crypt.

== Issue ==
Maria Anna had six children with her husband, John V, King of Portugal, four of whom survived infancy.

- Infanta Barbara of Portugal (4 December 1711 – 27 August 1758), became Queen of Spain as the wife of Ferdinand VI of Spain (1713–1759).
- Infante Pedro of Portugal (19 October 1712 – 29 October 1714), Prince of Brazil, died in infancy.
- Joseph I of Portugal (6 June 1714 – 24 February 1777), married Mariana Victoria of Spain (1718–1781).
- Infante Carlos of Portugal (2 May 1716 – 30 March 1736), died before his parents.
- Peter III of Portugal (5 July 1717 – 25 May 1786), married his niece Maria I, Queen (regnant) of Portugal (1734–1816).
- Infante Alexandre of Portugal (24 September 1723 – 2 August 1728), died in infancy.

== Ancestry ==
Ancestors of Maria Anna of Austria

8. Ferdinand II, Holy Roman Emperor
4. Ferdinand III, Holy Roman Emperor
9. Maria Anna of Bavaria
2. Leopold I, Holy Roman Emperor
10. Philip III of Spain
5. Maria Anna of Austria
11. Margaret of Austria
1. Maria Anna of Austria
12. Wolfgang William, Count Palatine of Neuburg
6. Philip William, Elector Palatine
13. Magdalene of Bavaria
3. Eleonore Magdalene of Neuburg
14. George II, Landgrave of Hesse-Darmstadt
7. Elisabeth Amalie of Hesse-Darmstadt
15. Sophia Eleonore of Saxony

== Bibliography ==
- Nizza da Silva, Maria Beatriz (2009). Reis de Portugal: D. João V (in Portuguese). Lisbon: Temas & Debates.
- Raggi, Giuseppina (2017). "The Queen of Portugal Maria Anna of Austria and the Royal Opera Theaters by Giovanni Carlo Sicinio Galli Bibiena". Music in Art: International Journal for Music Iconography. 42 (1–2): 121–140. ISSN 1522-7464.

Maria Anna of Austria House of Habsburg Born: 7 September 1683 Died: 14 August 1754
Portuguese royalty
Vacant Title last held by Maria Sophia of Neuburg	Queen consort of Portugal; 27 October 1708 – 31 July 1750	Succeeded by Mariana Victoria of Spain
