= Luisa de Guzmán =

Queen of Portugal from 1640 to 1656

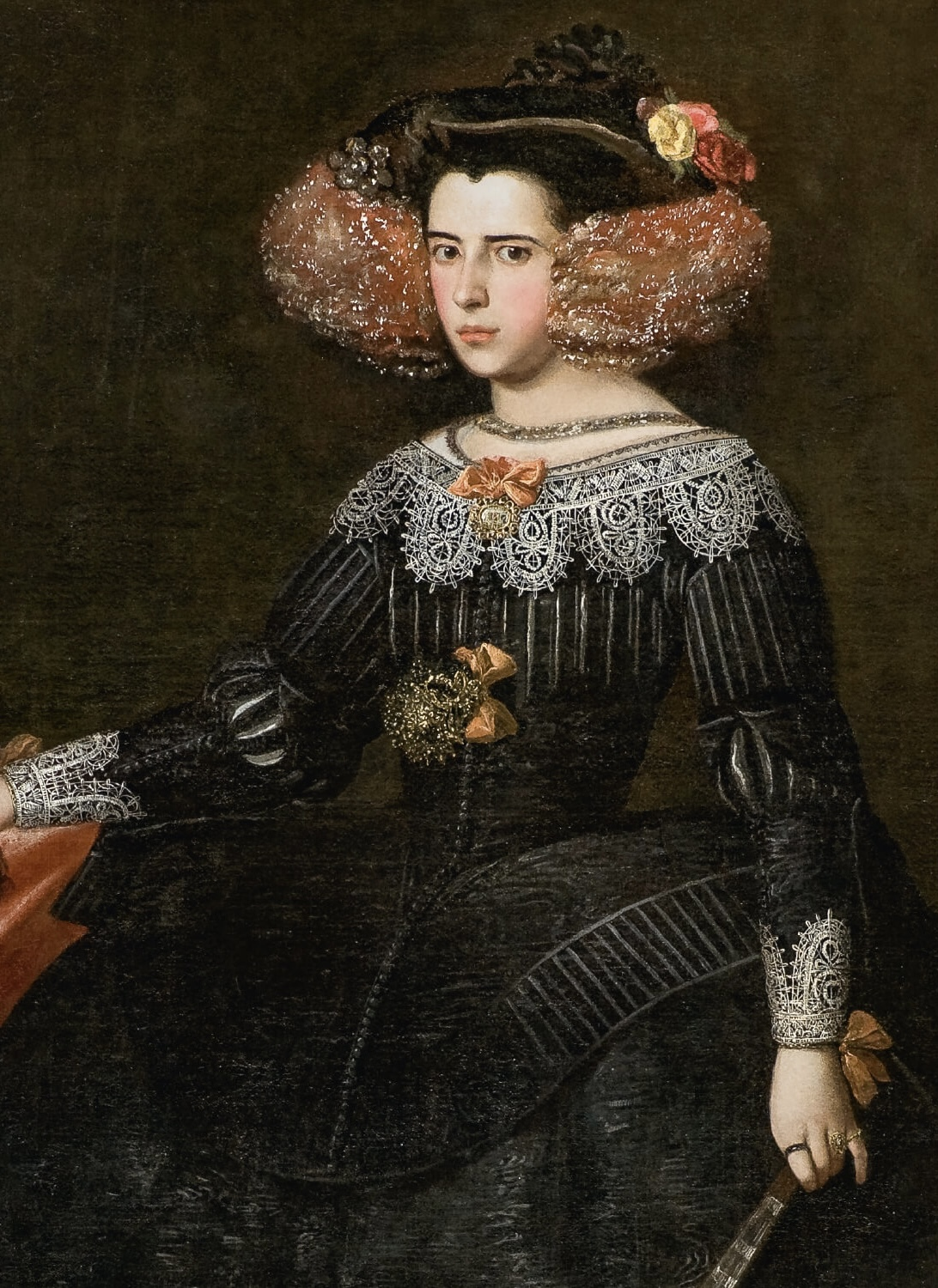
- Portrait attributed to Alonso Cano, 1632

Queen consort of Portugal
- Tenure: 1 December 1640 – 6 November 1656

Queen Regent of Portugal
- Regency: 6 November 1656 – 22 June 1662
- Monarch: Afonso VI
- Born: 13 October 1613; Huelva, Spain
- Died: 27 February 1666 (aged 52); Lisbon, Portugal
- Burial: Pantheon of the Braganzas
- Spouse: João IV of Portugal (m. 1633; died 1656)
- Issue: Teodósio, Prince of Brazil; Joana, Princess of Beira; Catarina, Queen of England, Scotland, and Ireland; Afonso VI, King of Portugal; Pedro II, King of Portugal
Names
- Luisa María Francisca de Guzmán y Sandoval
- House: Medina Sidonia
- Father: Manuel, 8th Duke of Medina Sidonia
- Mother: Juana de Sandoval y la Cerda

Luisa María Francisca de Guzmán y Sandoval (Portuguese: Luísa Maria Francisca de Gusmão; 13 October 1613 – 27 February 1666) was a Spanish noblewoman who became Queen of Portugal as the wife of King John IV, the first Braganza ruler. She was the mother of two kings of Portugal (Afonso VI and Peter II) and a queen of England (Catherine of Braganza). She served as regent of Portugal from 1656 until 1662.

== Biography ==
=== Early life ===
Luisa was Spanish by birth, the daughter of Manuel Pérez de Guzmán y Silva, 8th Duke of Medina Sidonia, and Juana Gómez de Sandoval y de la Cerda. Her paternal grandfather was Alonso Pérez de Guzmán y Sotomayor, 7th Duke of Medina Sidonia, while her paternal great-grandmother was Ana de Mendoza y de Silva, Princess of Éboli. Through her mother, she was also a descendant of Isabel, Lady of Viseu, the illegitimate daughter of King Ferdinand I.

She married a high ranking Portuguese noble, John, 8th Duke of Braganza, in 1633, during the period of the Iberian Union.

=== Restoration War ===
Despite her Spanish roots, Luisa guided her husband's policies during the Portuguese revolution against Habsburg Spain of 1640. She is considered the main influence behind his acceptance of the Portuguese throne.

=== Regency ===
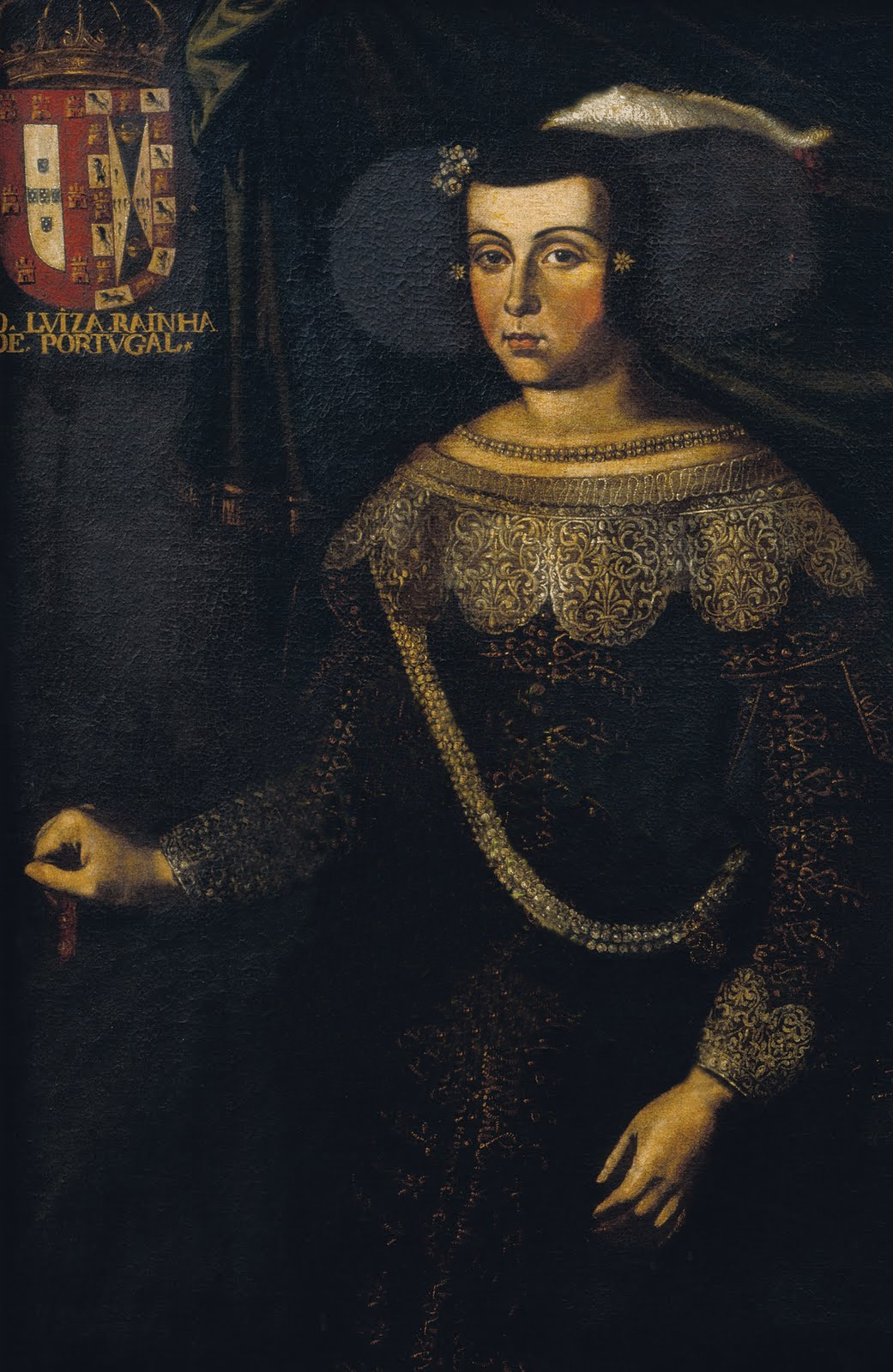
Luisa de Guzmán, Queen Consort of Portugal; José de Avelar Rebelo

In 1656, she was named Regent of the Kingdom after her husband's death and during the minority of her son Afonso VI.

Luisa was politically astute and mainly responsible for the diplomatic success of the new alliance with England. Her daughter Catherine married Charles II of England.

Afonso was considered mentally unfit for governing. In addition to lacking intellect, he exhibited wild and disruptive behavior. In 1662, after the king terrorized Lisbon at night alongside his favorites, Luisa and her council responded by banishing some of the king's companions that were associated with the raids. Angered, Afonso took power with the help of Castelo-Melhor and Luisa's regency came to an end. She subsequently retired to a convent, where she died in 1666.

== Issue ==
Arms of Luísa de Guzmán, Queen of Portugal

1. Infante Teodósio, Prince of Brazil (8 February 1634 – 13 May 1653) died unmarried.
2. Ana of Braganza (21 January 1635) died at birth.
3. Infanta Joana, Princess of Beira (18 September 1635 – 17 November 1653) died unmarried.
4. Catherine of Braganza (25 November 1638 – 31 December 1705) married Charles II of England and had no surviving issue.
5. Manuel of Portugal (6 September 1640) died at birth.
6. Afonso VI of Portugal (21 August 1643 – 12 September 1683) married Maria Francisca of Savoy.
7. Pedro II of Portugal (26 April 1648 – 9 December 1706) married firstly Maria Francisca of Savoy, had issue; married secondly Maria Sophia of Neuburg, had issue.

== Ancestry ==
Ancestors of Luisa de Guzmán

8. Juan Carlos, 9th Count of Niebla
4. Alonso, 7th Duke of Medina Sidonia
9. Leonor de Sotomayor y Zúniga
2. Manuel, 8th Duke of Medina Sidonia
10. Ruy, 1st Prince of Éboli
5. Ana de Silva y Mendoza
11. Ana, 2nd Princess of Mélito
1. Luisa de Guzmán
12. Francisco, 4th Marquis of Denia
6. Francisco, 1st Duke of Lerma
13. Isabel de Borja y Castro
3. Juana de Sandoval y la Cerda
14. Juan, 4th Duke of Medinaceli
7. Catalina de la Cerda y Portugal
15. Joana de Noronha

== Sources ==
- Ames, Glenn Joseph (2000). Renascent Empire?: The House of Braganza and the Quest for Stability in Portuguese Monsoon Asia, ca. 1640–1683. Amsterdam University Press. ISBN 978-90-5356-382-3. LCCN 00399002. OCLC 47099143. OL 6869913M.
- Carrasco Terriza, Manuel Jesús (2007). La Iglesia Mayor de San Pedro de Huelva. Historia de su fábrica [The Main Church of San Pedro de Huelva. History of your factory] (in Spanish). Diputación de Huelva, Servicio de Publicaciones. ISBN 978-84-8163-436-5. OCLC 316301076. OL 44923978M.
- Davidson, Lillias Campbell (1908). Catherine of Bragança, infanta of Portugal, & queen-consort of England. London: John Murray. LCCN 08021033. OCLC 1442850. OL 23285083M.
- Dyer, Thomas Henry (1877). Modern Europe. Vol. 3 (2nd ed.). London: George Bell & Sons.
- Livermore, H. V. (2 May 1969). A New History of Portugal. London: Cambridge University Press. ISBN 978-0-521-09571-6. LCCN 77415639. OCLC 1200570453.
- Marques, António Henrique R. de Oliveira (1976). History of Portugal. Vol. 1 & 2 (2nd ed.). New York: Columbia University Press. ISBN 978-0-231-08353-9. LCCN 76016780. OCLC 1149466753. OL 10195867M.
- McMurdo, Edward (1889). The History of Portugal: The history of Portugal from the reign of D. João II to the reign of D. João V. Vol. III. London: Sampson Low, Marston, Searle, & Rivington.
- Pereira, Esteves; Rodrigues, Guilherme (1908). "Luísa Francisca de Gusmão". In Torres, João Romano (ed.). Portugal: Dicionário Histórico, Corográfico, Heráldico, Biográfico, Bibliográfico, Numismático e Artístico [Portugal: Historical, Chorographic, Heraldic, Biographical, Bibliographical, Numismatic and Artistic Dictionary] (in Portuguese). Vol. IV. Lisbon. pp. 577–578 – via Arqnet.pt.
- Stephens, H. Morse (1891). The Story of Portugal. New York: G. P. Putnam's Sons, London: T. Fisher Unwin. LCCN 04017655. OCLC 3791222. OL 13527167M.

Luisa de Guzmán House of Medina Sidonia Born: 13 October 1613 Died: 27 February 1666
Portuguese royalty
Preceded by Elisabeth of France	Queen consort of Portugal; 1640–1656	Vacant Title next held by Maria Francisca Isabel of Savoy
