= Monastery of São Vicente de Fora =

17th-century church and monastery in Lisbon, Portugal

Coordinates: 38°42′53″N 9°07′40″W

Mosteiro de São Vicente de Fora
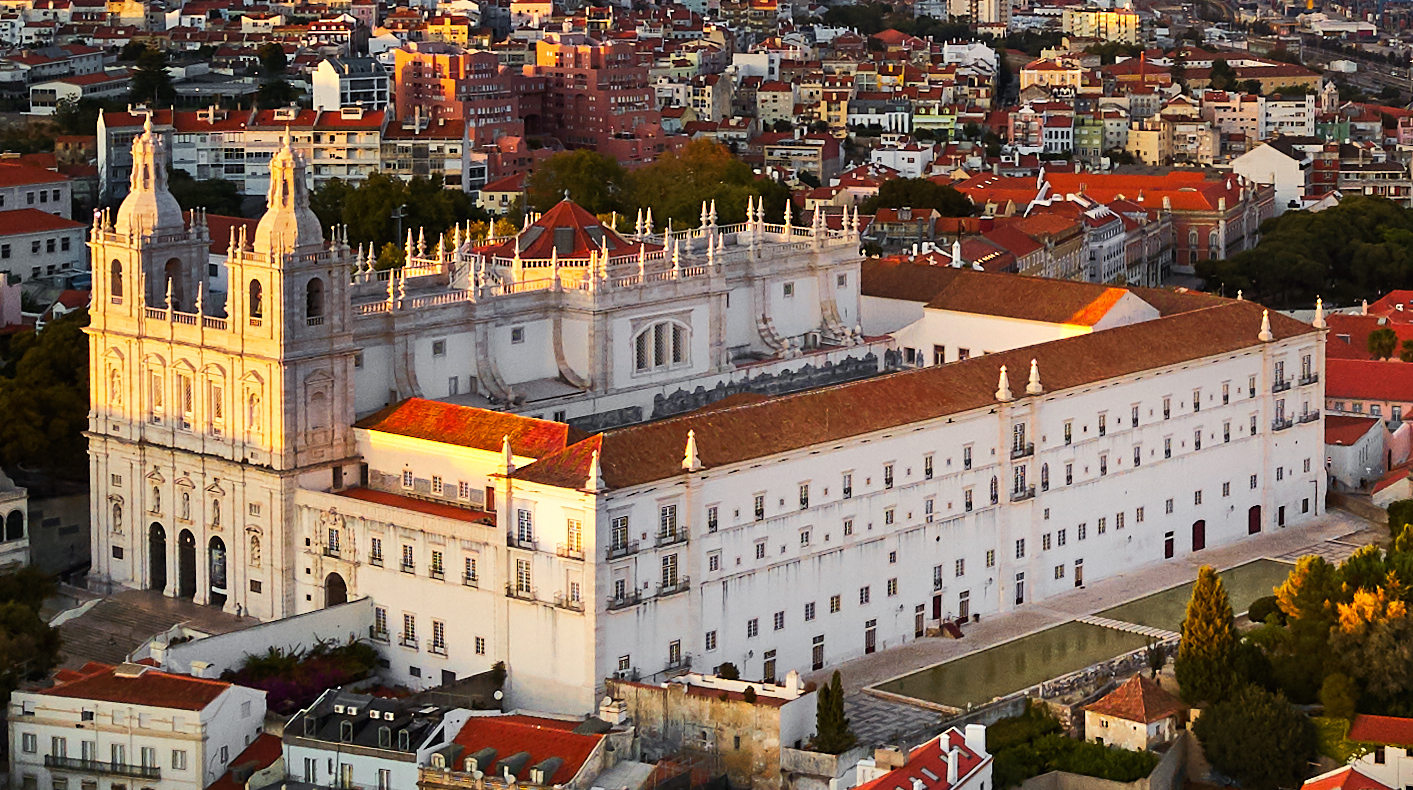

Religion
- Affiliation: Roman Catholic
- Diocese: Lisbon District
- Region: Lisboa Region
- Rite: Latin Rite

Location
- Location: Largo de São Vicente, 1170 Lisboa, Portugal
- Municipality: Lisbon
- Interactive map of Mosteiro de São Vicente de Fora

Architecture
- Style: Mannerist
- Groundbreaking: 1147
- Completed: 1629

The Church and Monastery of São Vicente de Fora (Portuguese: Igreja e Mosteiro de São Vicente de Fora), meaning "Monastery of St. Vincent Outside the Walls", is a 17th-century church and monastery in the city of Lisbon, Portugal. It is one of the most important monasteries and mannerist buildings in the country. The monastery also contains the royal pantheon of the Braganza monarchs of Portugal.

== History and art ==
The original Monastery of São Vicente de Fora was founded around 1147 by the first Portuguese King, Afonso Henriques, for the Augustinian Order. Built in Romanesque style outside the city walls, it was one of the most important monastic foundations in medieval Portugal. It is dedicated to Saint Vincent of Saragossa, patron saint of Lisbon, whose relics were brought from the Algarve to Lisbon in the 12th century.

The present buildings are the result of a reconstruction ordered by King Philip II of Spain, who had become King of Portugal (as Philip I) after a succession crisis in 1580. The church of the monastery was built between 1582 and 1629, while other monastery buildings were finished only in the 18th century. The author of the design of the church is thought to be the Italian Jesuit Filippo Terzi and/or the Spaniard Juan de Herrera. The plans were followed and modified by Leonardo Turriano, Baltazar Álvares, Pedro Nunes Tinoco and João Nunes Tinoco. In 1755, an earthquake hit Lisbon, causing damage to the church which then needed reconstruction. The church of the Monastery has a majestic, austere façade that follows the later Renaissance style known as Mannerism. The façade, attributed to Baltazar Álvares, has several niches with statues of saints and is flanked by two towers (a model that would become widespread in Portugal). The lower part of the façade has three arches that lead to the galilee (entrance hall). The floorplan of the church reveals a Latin cross building with a one-aisled nave with lateral chapels. The church is covered by barrel vaulting and has a huge dome over the crossing. The general design of the church interior follows that of the prototypic church of The Gesù, in Rome. Within the monastery are ceramic tiles formed into panels that depict several different scenes. The ceramic tiles that were created are called azulejo. The tiles were created and painted for the monastery during two separate periods established by Santos Simoes. The first period was from 1700 until 1725 and was called the "great painting period," during King Joao V's reign. The second period was called "the great production period," which lasted from 1725 until 1755. The scenes range from life in the countryside, hunting, and even noble amusement. In total, there are over 150 different panels and scenes within the monastery.

The main altarpiece is a Baroque work of the 18th century by one of the Portuguese sculptors, Joaquim Machado de Castro. It has the form of a baldachin and is decorated with numerous statues. The church also contains several altarpieces in its lateral chapels.

The Monastery complex is entered through a baroque portal adjacent to the church façade. In the entrance hall, 18th century blue and white tiles that tell the history of the Monastery, including scenes of the Siege of Lisbon in 1147. The ceiling of the room has an illusionistic painting executed in 1710 by the Italian Vincenzo Baccarelli. The sacristy of the Monastery is exuberantly decorated with polychromed marble and painting. The cloisters are also notable for the 18th century tiles that recount fables of La Fontaine, among other themes.

== Braganza Pantheon ==
In 1834, after the Dissolution of the monasteries in Portugal, the monastery was transformed into a palace for the archbishops of Lisbon. Some decades later, King Ferdinand II transformed the monks' old refectory into a pantheon for the kings of the House of Braganza. Their tombs were transferred from the main chapel to this room.

== Gallery ==
Main façade of the Church of São Vicente de Fora

Roof terrace looking towards the church towers

Cloister courtyard and arcades

Entrance hall with a painted ceiling and blue-and-white azulejos

View along the nave towards the chancel

High altar and baldachin in the chancel

Sacristy with a painted ceiling and inlaid polychrome marble decoration

Inlaid polychrome marble wall decoration in the sacristy

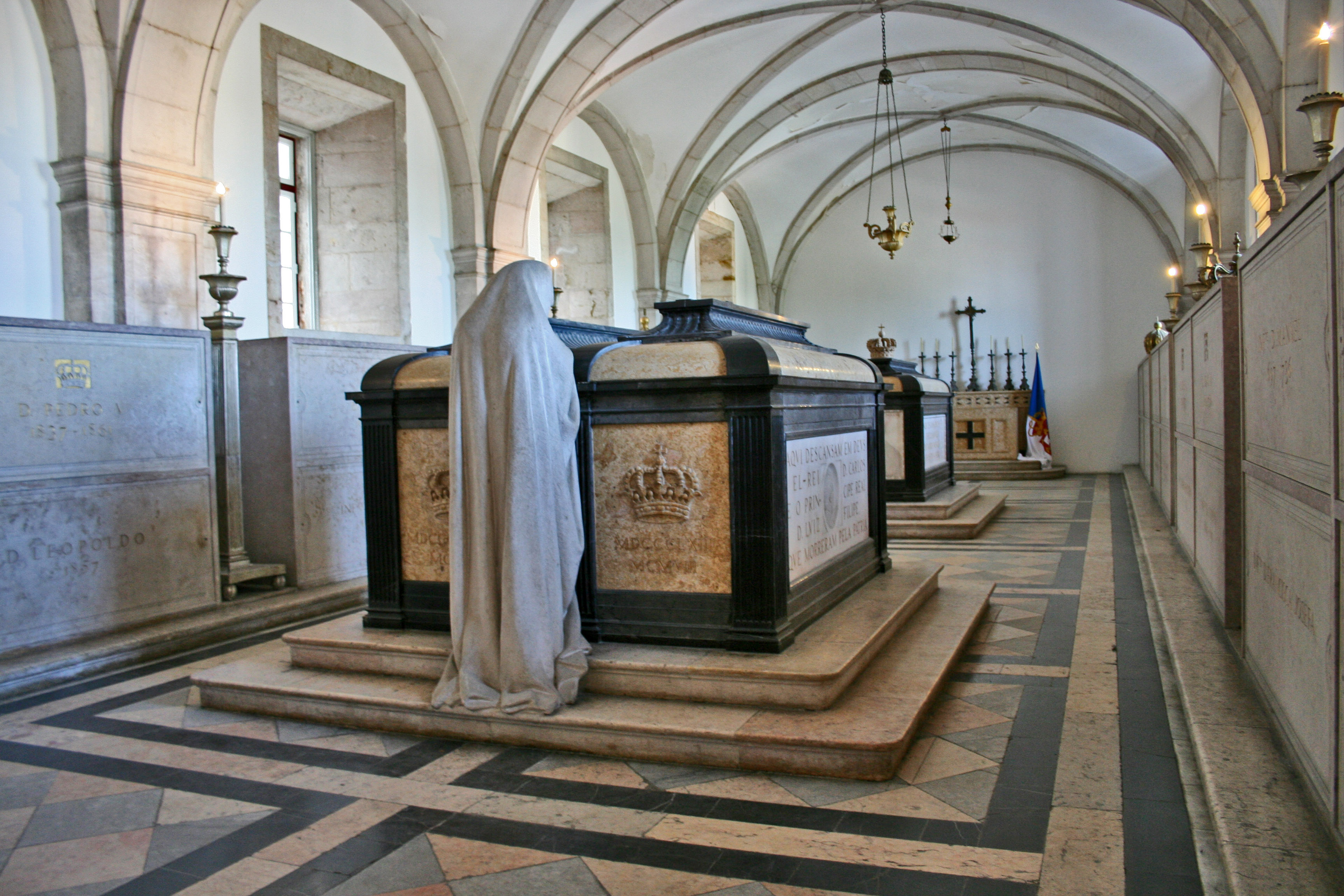
Royal Pantheon of the House of Braganza

Azulejo panel illustrating one of La Fontaine’s fables
