= Manuel de Guzmán y Silva, 8th Duke of Medina Sidonia =

Juan Manuel Pérez de Guzmán, 8th Duke of Medina Sidonia
- Born: 7 January 1579
- Died: 20 March 1636
- Noble family: House of Medina Sidonia
- Spouse: Juana de Sandoval
- Father: Alonso Pérez de Guzmán, 7th Duke of Medina Sidonia
- Mother: Ana de Silva y Mendoza

Juan Manuel Pérez de Guzmán y Silva (7 January 1579 – 20 March 1636) was a Spanish noble and 8th Duke of Medina Sidonia.

He was the son of Alonso Pérez de Guzmán, 7th Duke of Medina Sidonia, commander-in-chief of the Spanish Armada and Ana de Silva y Mendoza, daughter of Ana de Mendoza, Princess of Éboli.
He married in 1598, aged 19, Juana de Sandoval, daughter of the Duke of Lerma, a favourite of Philip III of Spain. He was promoted to Knight of the Order of the Golden Fleece in 1615, aged 36 and 34 years after his father. In the same year he became 8th Duke of Medina Sidonia.

As Captain General of the Spanish Galleys (Galeras de España), he fought against the Barbary pirates and played a role in organising the occupation of their bases at Larache and La Mamora in present-dat Morocco.

Captain General of the Atlantic Ocean (Mar Océano) since 1595, he commanded in 1625, from Jerez de la Frontera, the military operations neutralizing the attack on Cadiz by a Dutch-English Fleet, commanded by Sir Edward Cecil.

His eldest daughter Luisa de Guzmán (1613–1666) became queen-consort of Portugal when her husband John II, 8th Duke of Braganza, became John IV, the first King of Portugal of the House of Braganza in 1640. In order to encourage her husband when the Portuguese nobility offered him the crown of Portugal, Luisa is known for her phrase: "better Queen for one day, than Duchess all my life".

His granddaughter Catherine of Braganza married King Charles II of England.

== Sources ==
- Real Academia de la Historia

Manuel de Guzmán y Silva, 8th Duke of Medina Sidonia House of Medina Sidonia Born: 7 January 1579 Died: 20 March 1636
Spanish nobility
Preceded by Alonso Pérez de Guzmán	Duke of Medina Sidonia; 1615–1636	Succeeded by Gaspar Alfonso Pérez de Guzmán
