= Infanta Isabel =

Infanta Isabel may refer to:

== Aragon ==
- Isabella of Aragon, Queen of France (c.1247–271)
- Elizabeth of Portugal (1271–1336), Queen of Portugal
- Isabella of Aragon, Queen of Germany (1300–1330)
- Isabella of Aragon, Countess of Urgell (1376–1424)
- Isabella of Aragon, Queen of Portugal (1470–1498), also Infanta of Castile

== Castile ==
- Isabella of Castile, Queen of Aragon (1283–1328)
- Isabella of Castile, Duchess of York (1355–1392)
- Isabella I of Castile (1451–1504), Queen of Castile and León, and Queen consort of Aragon

== Navarre ==
- Isabella of France (c.1295–1358), daughter of monarchs of France and Navarre, and Queen of England
- Isabella of Navarre, Countess of Armagnac (1395–1450)
- Isabella of Navarre, Viscountess of Rohan (1512–aft.1560)

== Spain ==
- Isabella of Austria (1501–1526), Queen of Denmark, Norway and Sweden
- Isabella Clara Eugenia (1566–1633)
- Princess Isabella of Parma (1741–1763)
- Isabella II (1830–1904), Queen of Spain
- Infanta Isabel Fernanda of Spain (1821–1897)
- Infanta Isabel, Countess of Girgenti (1851–1931)
- Princess Isabel Alfonsa of Bourbon-Two Sicilies (1904–1985)

== Portugal ==
- Isabella of Portugal, Queen of Castile (1428–1496)
- Isabel of Coimbra (1432–1455)
- Isabella of Portugal (1503–1539), Queen of Spain and Holy Roman Empress
- Infanta Isabel Maria of Braganza (1801–1876)
- Princess Isabel Maria of Braganza (1894–1970)

== See also ==
- Isabella of Aragon (disambiguation)
- Isabella of Castile (disambiguation)
- Isabella of Navarre (disambiguation)
- Isabella of Portugal (disambiguation)
