= Count of Belmonte =

Noble title in the Kingdom of Portugal

Countship Belmonte
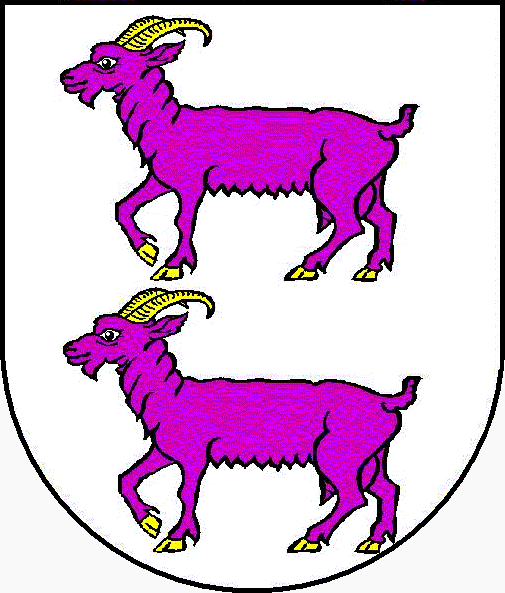
- Creation date: 13 May 1805
- Created by: Maria I of Portugal
- First holder: Dom Vasco Manuel de Figueiredo Cabral da Câmara
- Last holder: Dom Vasco Maria Figueiredo de Cabral da Câmara (Monarchy abolished)
- Present holder: Dom Vasco Maria d'Orey de Figueiredo Cabral da Câmara (Claimant)
- Subsidiary titles: Lord of Azurara in perpetuity Lord of Manteigas in perpetuity Lord of Moimenta da Serra in perpetuity Lord of Tavares in perpetuity Lord of the Cabral Majorat in Belmonte
- Extinction date: 1910 (Monarchy abolished)

Count of Belmonte is a noble title created by Dom João, Prince Regent of Queen Maria I of Portugal, by Decree of 13 May 1805, in favour of Dom Vasco Manuel de Figueiredo Cabral da Câmara, formerly Alcaide-Mayor of the Castle of Belmonte, Lord of Azurara in perpetuity, Lord of Manteigas in perpetuity, Lord of Moimenta da Serra in perpetuity, Lord of Tavares in perpetuity, and Lord of the Cabral Majorat in Belmonte.

They bore the undifferenced arms of Cabral and, later, following the marriage of the 3rd Count to a granddaughter of a monarch, a quartered shield of the Royal Arms, Figueiredo, Câmara and Cabral, surmounted by a Count's coronet.

== Counts of Belmonte (1805) ==
#	Name	Dates	Title	Notes
1	Dom Vasco Manuel de Figueiredo Cabral da Câmara	29 March 1767 – 10 November 1830	1st Count of Belmonte	He married, on 17 January 1795, to Dona Jerónima Margarida de Noronha (1775 —1839), Lady-in-waiting to Queen Maria I, and daughter of José de Noronha, Moço Fidalgo of the Royal Household; Issue was born of this marriage;
2	Dom José Maria de Figueiredo Cabral da Câmara	15 December 1800 – 5 April 1834	2nd Count of Belmonte	He married, in the freguesia of São José, in the city of Rio de Janeiro, on 24 November 1820, to Dona Maria Domingas de Castelo Branco (1805–1885), Lady-in-waiting to Queens Maria I, Carlota Joaquina, Maria II, Estefânia and Maria Pia, and daughter of the 2nd Marquess of Belas; Issue was born of this marriage;
3	Dom Vasco António de Figueiredo Cabral da Câmara	4 May 1829 – 9 September 1870	3rd Count of Belmonte	He married, in the freguesia of Ajuda, in the oratory of the Dukes of Terceira, on 24 October 1847, to Dona Maria Carlota Josefa Joana Francisca Assis Xavier de Paula Micaela Gabriela Rafaela Luísa Gonzaga de Mendonça Rolim de Moura Barreto (Paris, 1829 – Lisbon, 1907), Lady-in-waiting to Queens Maria II, Estefânia and Maria Pia, and daughter of Nuno José Severo de Mendonça Rolim de Moura Barreto, 1st Duke of Loulé, and of his wife, Her Serene Highness Infanta Dona Ana de Jesus Maria, daughter of King João VI; Issue was born of this marriage;
4	Dom Vasco Maria Figueiredo de Cabral da Câmara	9 November 1885 – 21 May 1949	4th Count of Belmonte	Son of Dom José Maria de Figueiredo Cabral da Câmara (son of the 3rd Count), and grandson of the 3rd Count of Belmonte; He married, on 9 March 1916, his cousin Dona Ana de Jesus Maria Siqueira (1895 — ?), daughter of José António de Siqueira Freire and his wife, Dona Maria Teresa de Mendonça Rolim de Moura Barreto; Issue was born of this marriage;

== Claimants post-Monarchy ==
#	Name	Dates	Title	Notes
5	Dom Vasco Maria de Figueiredo Cabral da Câmara	13 March 1919 – 6 September 2012	5th Count of Belmonte	Son of the 4th Count of Belmonte; He married, on 29 October 1955, Dona Maria João de Albuquerque d’Orey;
6	Dom José Maria de Figueiredo Cabral da Câmara	b. 8 October 1960	6th Count of Belmonte	—

== Notes ==
- This article was originally translated, in whole or in part, from the Portuguese Wikipedia article titled "Conde de Belmonte".
