= Isabella of Braganza =

Isabella, Isabel, Elizabeth or Elisabeth of Braganza may refer to:

- Isabella of Barcelos (1402–1466), daughter of Afonso, Duke of Braganza, wife of Infante John, Constable of Portugal
- Isabel of Viseu, Duchess of Braganza (1459–1521)
- Isabella of Braganza, Duchess of Guimarães (1514–1576), daughter of Jaime I, Duke of Braganza, wife of Infante Edward, 4th Duke of Guimarães
- Isabel Luísa, Princess of Beira (1668–1690), infanta of Portugal
- Maria Isabel of Braganza (1797–1818), infanta of Portugal, consort Queen of Spain
- Infanta Isabel Maria of Portugal (1801–1876), infanta of Portugal
- Isabel, Princess Imperial of Brazil (1846–1921)
- Isabel, Duchess of Braganza (born 1966), wife of current claimant to Portuguese throne

== See also ==
- Isabella of Portugal (disambiguation)
