= Count of Vale de Reis =

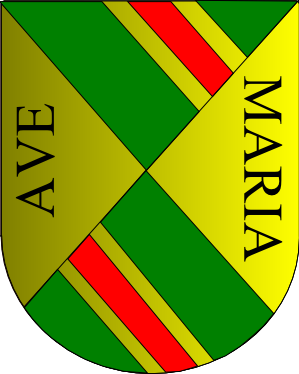
Coat of Arms of the Marquesses and Dukes of Loulé.

Count of Vale de Reis (in Portuguese Conde de Vale de Reis) is a Portuguese title of nobility granted by royal decree of King Philip III of Portugal, dated from August 16, 1628, to Nuno de Mendonça (c. 1560 – 1632).

The Counts of Vale de Reis, who inherited several Lordships and estates, became Marquesses of Loulé (in 1799) and Dukes of Loulé (in 1862).

== Family name ==
Originally, the family name associated with this House was Mendonça.

Due to different Lordships inherited by this family, several other names were added and, in the late 18th Century, they became known as Mendonça Rolim de Moura Barreto.

== List of counts of Vale de Reis ==
1. Nuno de Mendonça (c. 1560 – 1632)
2. Nuno de Mendonça (1612–1692)
3. Lourenço de Mendonça e Moura (1642–1707)
4. Nuno Manuel de Mendonça (1670–1732)
5. Lourenço Filipe Nery de Mendonça e Moura (1705–1788)
6. Nuno José de Mendonça e Moura (1733–1799)
7. José Maria de Mendonça e Moura
8. Agostinho Domingos José de Mendonça Rolim de Moura Barreto (1780–1824), became 1st Marquis of Loulé in 1799;
9. Nuno José Severo de Mendonça Rolim de Moura Barreto (1804–1875), also 2nd Marquis of Loulé and 1st Duke of Loulé (1862).

(for the list of holders after this date see Duke of Loulé)

== Other titles ==
The family also holds the titles of:

- Marquis of Loulé, granted by decree of Maria I of Portugal dated from July 6, 1799;
- Duke of Loulé, granted by royal decree of Luis I of Portugal dated from October 3, 1862.

== See also ==
- List of countships in Portugal
- List of marquisates in Portugal
- Dukedoms in Portugal
