= Isabella of Sicily =

Isabella of Sicily may refer to one of the following Sicilian royal consorts:

- Isabella II of Jerusalem (1212–1228), consort of Frederick II, Holy Roman Emperor (Frederick I, King of Sicily)
- Isabella of England (1214–1241), consort of Frederick II, Holy Roman Emperor (Frederick I, King of Sicily)
- Isabella of Castile, Queen of Aragon (1283–1328), consort of James II, King of Aragon (James I, King of Sicily)
- Isabella I of Castile (1451–1504), consort of Ferdinand II, King of Aragon (Ferdinand II, King of Sicily)
- Isabella of Portugal (1503–1539), consort of Charles V, Holy Roman Emperor (Charles II, King of Sicily)

== See also ==
- Isabella of Aragon (disambiguation)
