= Infanta Ana =

Infanta Ana may refer to:

- Anne of Navarre (1492–1532), daughter of Queen Catherine and King John III of Navarre
- Anne of Austria (1601–1666), daughter of King Philip III of Spain, and Queen of France
- Infanta Ana de Jesus Maria of Braganza (1806–1857), daughter of King John V of Portugal
- Princess Anne, Duchess of Calabria (born 1938), wife of Carlos de Borbón-Dos Sicilias, Infante of Spain and Duke of Calabria
