= Duke of Loulé =

Portuguese Title of Nobility

Dukedom of Loulé
- Creation date: 3 October 1862
- Created by: Luis I of Portugal
- Peerage: Peerage of Portugal
- First holder: Nuno José Severo de Mendoça Rolim de Moura Barreto
- Present holder: Pedro José Folque de Mendoça Rolim de Moura Barreto
- Remainder to: Male primogeniture
- Subsidiary titles: Count of Vale de Reis

Duke of Loulé is a Portuguese title of nobility created by a royal decree of King Luis I of Portugal, dated from October 3, 1862, to his grand-uncle Nuno José Severo de Mendoça Rolim de Moura Barreto, 2nd Marquis of Loulé and 9th Count of Vale de Reis. The new duke descended from earlier Portuguese monarchs and belonged to the highest nobility. After the fall of the monarchy in 1910 and the death of King Manuel II, the Duke of Loulé was acclaimed by his supporters as head of the Portuguese Royal house.

== History ==
Duke Nuno served several times as Prime Minister of Portugal.

On December 5, 1827, Nuno of Loulé married Infanta Ana de Jesus Maria of Braganza, youngest daughter of King John VI of Portugal. They had five children; she died before he was elevated to ducal rank.

When the deposed King Manuel II of Portugal died in 1932, Constança Maria was the representative of the House of Loulé (4th Duchess of Loulé, if one counts all the subsequent heirs of the original duke, including those that never registered the ducal title as required by law during the monarchy).

=== Modern dukes and claims to the throne ===
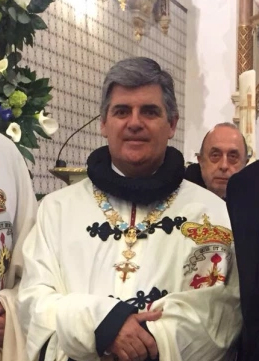
Pedro José Folque de Mendoça Rolim de Moura Barreto, Duke of Loulé

The current representative is the infanta's great-great-great-grandson, Pedro José Folque de Mendoça Rolim de Moura Barreto. He is styled 6th Duke of Loulé in Dom Filipe Folque de Mendoça's work on the "A Casa de Loulé e suas Alianças", but he is the 4th duke according to Portugal's post-monarchic titular convention, which considers the title only properly renewed in 1992 for Dom Pedro's father, the 3rd (or 5th) duke (who also registered the style of Dom, which the Loulés had not traditionally used, although entitled to do so).

During the exile of Miguel I of Portugal and his male heirs from 1834 until 1950, Infanta Ana's descendants remained domiciled in Portugal. Therefore, the claim of the current duke to the defunct throne, as the infanta's dynastic representative, has been contrasted with that of Duarte Pio of Braganza, great-grandson and heir of Miguel I. In "As Senhoras Infantas filhas de D. João VI", published in Lisbon in 1938, Ângelo Pereira quotes, on page 161, a letter from the infanta to her brother Dom Pedro, assuming her marriage had not been authorized (although nothing in Portugal's law required a cadet infanta to obtain royal consent or Cortes's permission to marry). The Dukes of Loulé have not, in the past, pressed any claim to the throne publicly, whereas the Portuguese government and media have accorded some indications of recognition to the claimant Duarte Pio as the dynasty's royal representative since the death of the controversial claimant Maria Pia of Saxe-Coburg and Braganza in 1995. Since the Miguelist line has been disinherited by the Portuguese Cortes law of 1834, the Dukes of Loulé as being the highest legitimate senior members of the Braganza family have claimed the throne of Portugal.

== Palácio do Duque de Loulé ==
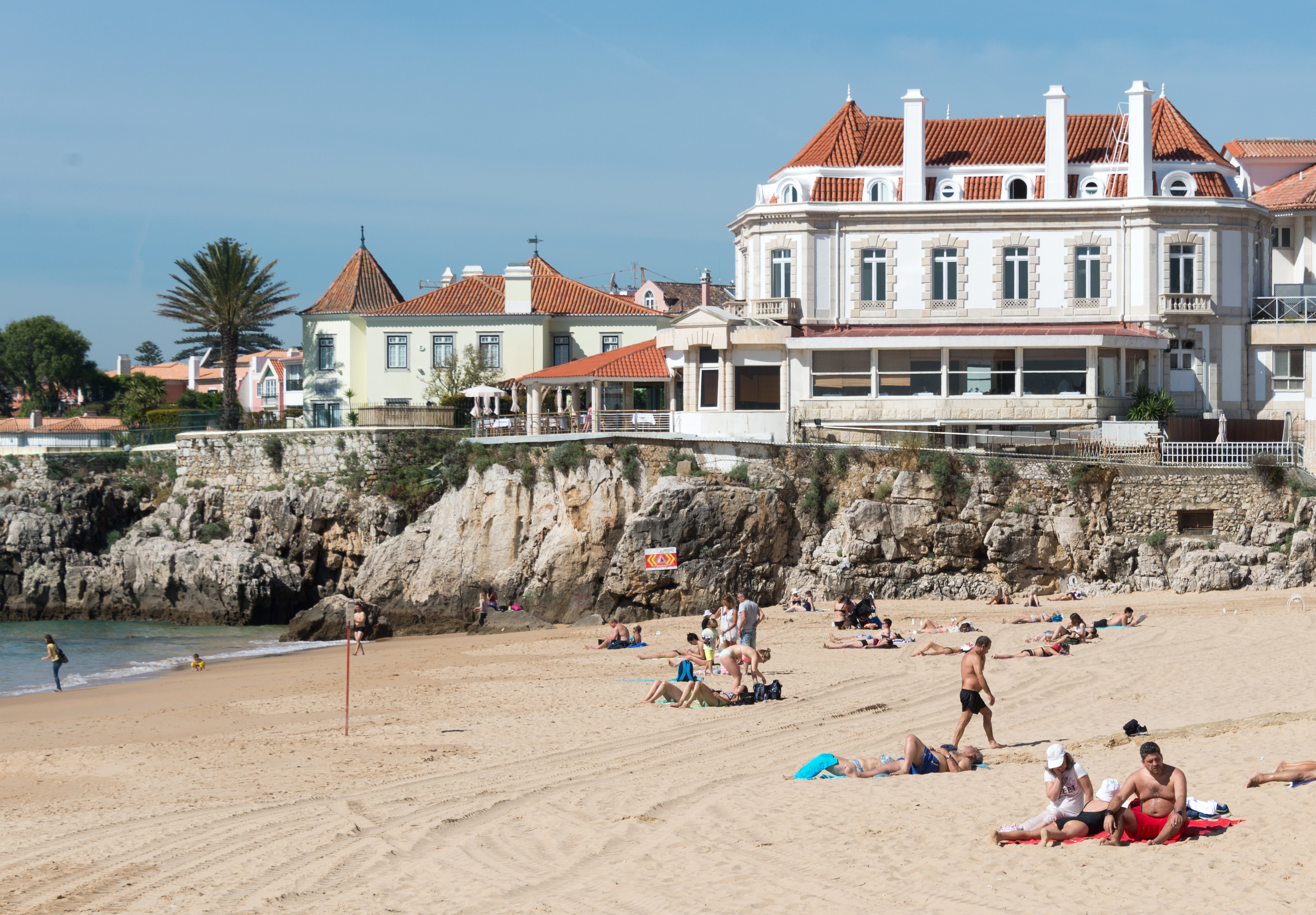
Palácio do Duque de Loulé (on the right), on the Portuguese Riviera.

The Palácio do Duque de Loulé (Palace of the Duke of Loulé) is a palatial villa in Cascais, on the Portuguese Riviera, famed as a notable example of summer architecture. Built in 1870 by the 1st Duke of Loulé, today it is a luxury hotel, the Hotel Albatroz.

== Family name ==
The dukes' family name is Folque Mendoça Rolim de Moura Barreto.

== List of dukes of Loulé ==
1. D. Nuno José Severo de Mendoça Rolim de Moura Barreto (1804–1875)
2. D. Pedro José Agostinho de Mendoça Rolim de Moura Barreto (1830–1909)
3. D. Maria Domingas José de Mendonça Rolim de Moura Barreto (1853–1928)
4. D. Constança Maria da Conceição Berquó de Mendoça Rolim de Moura Barreto (1889–1965)
5. D. Alberto Nuno Carlos Rita Folque de Mendóça Rolim de Moura Barreto (1923–2003)
6. D. Pedro José Folque de Mendoça Rolim de Moura Barreto (1958–)

== Genealogical summary ==
John VI [1767‑1826] King of Portugal; 1816–1826	Agostinho Domingos José de Mendoça Rolim de Moura Barreto, 1st Marquess of Loulé [1780‑1824]
Pedro I and IV, Emperor of Brazil [1798‑1834] King of Portugal; 1826‑1826	Miguel I [1802‑1866] King of Portugal; 1828‑1834; Miguelist Claimant; 1834‑1866	Ana de Jesus Maria [1806‑1857]	Nuno José Severo de Mendoça Rolim de Moura Barreto, 1st Duke and 2nd Marquess of Loulé [1804‑1875]
Maria II [1819‑1853] Queen of Portugal; 1826‑1828 and 1834‑1853	Fernando II [1816‑1885] King of Portugal; 1837‑1853	Pedro II, Emperor of Brazil [1825‑1891]	Pedro José Agostinho de Mendoça Rolim de Moura Barreto, 2nd Duke and 3rd Marquess of Loulé [1830‑1909]
Pedro V [1837‑1861] King of Portugal; 1853‑1861	Luis I [1838‑1889] King of Portugal; 1861‑1889	Isabel, Princess Imperial [1846‑1921]	Miguel, Duke of Braganza [1853‑1927] Miguelist Claimant; 1866‑1920	Maria Domingas José de Mendonça Rolim de Moura Barreto, 3rd Duchess and 4th Marchioness of Loulé [1853‑1928]
Carlos I [1863‑1908] King of Portugal; 1889‑1908	Pedro de Alcântara, Prince of Grão-Pará [1875‑1940]	Constança Maria da Conceição Berquó de Mendoça Rolim de Moura Barreto, 4th Duchess and 5th Marchioness of Loulé [1889‑1965] Loulé Claimant; 1932‑1965
Maria Pia disputed [1907‑1995] Rouge Claimant; 1932/1957‑1987	Manuel II [1889‑1932] King of Portugal; 1908‑1910; Liberal Claimant; 1910‑1932	Maria Francisca [1914‑1968]	Duarte Nuno, Duke of Braganza [1907–1976] Miguelist Claimant; 1920‑1932; Majority Claimant; 1932‑1976	Alberto Nuno Carlos Rita Folque de Mendóça Rolim de Moura Barreto, 5th Duke and 6th Marquess of Loulé [1923‑2003] Loulé Claimant; 1965‑2003
Duarte Pio, Duke of Braganza [born 1945] Majority Claimant since 1976	Pedro José Folque de Mendoça Rolim de Moura Barreto, 6th Duke and 7th Marquess of Loulé [born 1958] Loulé Claimant since 2003

== See also ==
- Count of Vale de Reis
- Marquis of Loulé
- Dukedoms in Portugal
