= Marquess of Loulé =

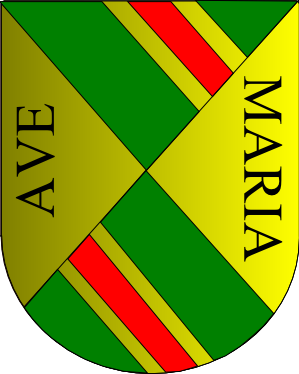
Coat of Arms of the Marquesses and Dukes of Loulé.

Marquess of Loulé (in Portuguese Marquês de Loulé) is a Portuguese title granted by royal decree of Queen Maria I of Portugal, dated from July 6, 1799, to Dom Agostinho Domingos José de Mendoça Rolim de Moura Barreto (1780–1824), who already was 8th Count of Vale de Reis.

This title was later inherited by his son, Nuno José Severo de Mendoça Rolim de Moura Barreto, who married Infanta Ana de Jesus Maria, King John VI younger daughter.

== Family Name ==
The family name associated with the House of Loulé is de Mendoça Rolim de Moura Barreto.

== List of the Marquesses of Loulé ==
1. Agostinho Domingos José de Mendoça Rolim de Moura Barreto (1780–1824), 1st Marquis of Loulé, 8th Count of Vale de Reis;
2. Nuno José Severo de Mendoça Rolim de Moura Barreto (1804–1875), 2nd Marquis of Loulé, 9th Count of Vale de Reis, who became 1st Duke of Loulé in 1862.

(for the list of holders after this date see Duke of Loulé)

== Other Titles ==
The family also holds the title of Count of Vale de Reis, granted by decree of King Philip III of Portugal (also known as Philip IV of Spain) dated from August 16, 1628.

== See also ==
- Dukedoms in Portugal
- List of marquisates in Portugal
- List of prime ministers of Portugal
