= Isabella of Portugal (disambiguation) =

Isabella of Portugal (1503–1539) was Holy Roman Empress and Queen of Spain as the wife of Charles V.

Isabella, Isabel, Elizabeth or Elisabeth of Portugal may also refer to:

- Elizabeth of Portugal (1271–1336), saint, queen consort of Portugal
- Isabella of Portugal, Lady of Viseu (1364–1395), natural daughter of King Ferdinand I of Portugal
- Isabella of Portugal, Duchess of Burgundy (1397–1471), daughter of King John I of Portugal and third wife of Philip the Good
- Isabella of Barcelos (1414–1476), also known as Isabella of Braganza, daughter of Afonso I, Duke of Braganza, wife of Infante John, Constable of Portugal
- Isabella of Portugal, Queen of Castile (1428–1496)
- Isabella of Coimbra (1432–1455), queen consort of Portugal
- Isabella of Viseu (1459–1521)
- Isabella, Princess of Asturias (1470–1498), queen consort of Portugal
- Isabella of Braganza, Duchess of Guimarães (1514–1576), daughter of Jaime I, Duke of Braganza, wife of Infante Edward, 4th Duke of Guimarães
- Infanta Isabella Clara Eugenia of Spain (1566–1633), infanta of Portugal
- Isabel Luísa, Princess of Beira (1668–1690), infanta of Portugal
- Maria Isabel of Braganza (1797–1818), infanta of Portugal, consort Queen of Spain
- Infanta Isabel Maria of Portugal (1801–1876), infanta of Portugal
- Isabel, Princess Imperial of Brazil (1846–1921)
- Isabel, Duchess of Braganza (b. 1966)

== See also ==
- Isabella of Braganza (disambiguation)
