= John VI of Portugal =

King of Portugal from 1816 to 1826

John VI
- Emperor of Brazil (titular) (Note: From 29 August 1825 until his death in 1826.)
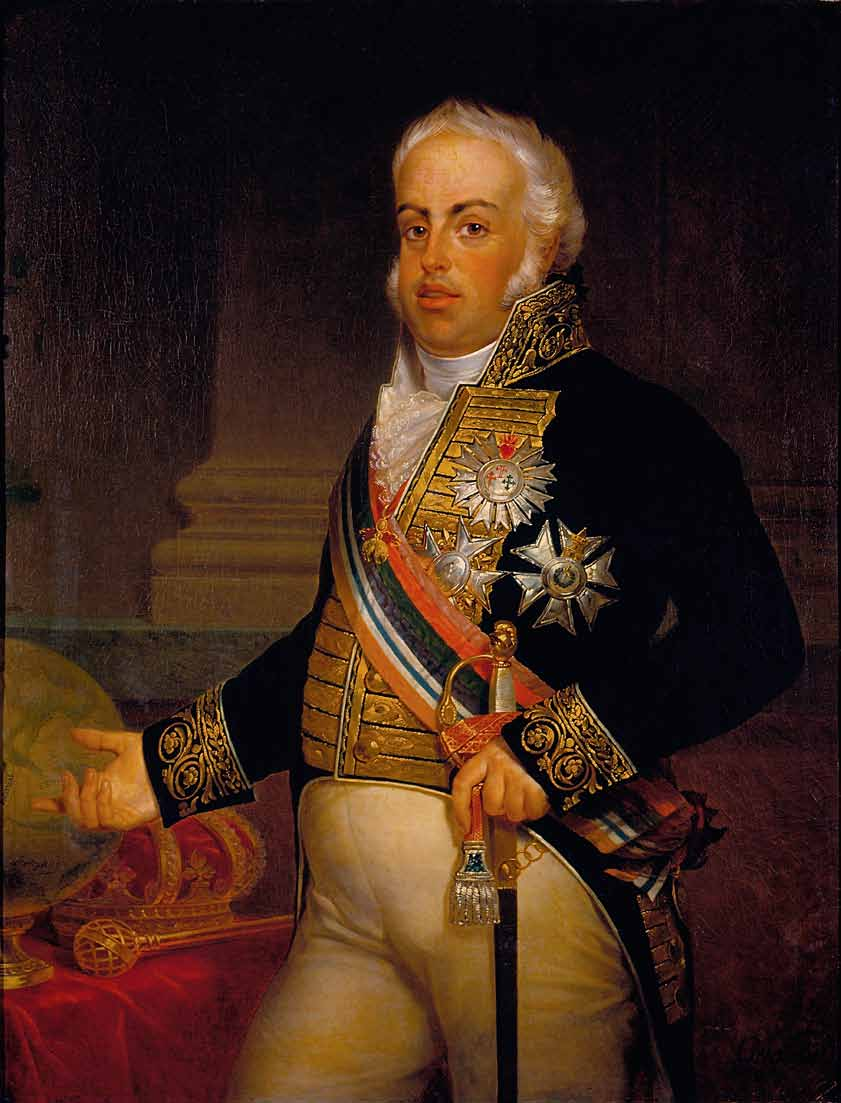
- Portrait, 1826

King of Portugal
- Reign: 20 March 1816 – 10 March 1826
- Acclamation: 6 February 1818; Royal Chapel
- Predecessor: Maria I
- Successor: Pedro IV

King of Brazil
- Reign: 20 March 1816 – 12 October 1822
- Acclamation: 6 February 1818; Royal Chapel
- Predecessor: Maria I
- Successor: Pedro I (as Emperor)
- Prince regent: Pedro, Prince Royal (1821–1822)
- Born: 13 May 1767; Palace of Queluz, Queluz, Portugal
- Died: 10 March 1826 (aged 58); Bemposta Palace, Lisbon, Portugal
- Burial: Pantheon of the House of Braganza, Lisbon, Portugal
- Spouse: Carlota Joaquina of Spain (m. 1785)
- Issue Detail: Maria Teresa, Infanta of Spain and Portugal; António, Prince of Beira; Maria Isabel, Queen of Spain; Pedro I and IV, Emperor of Brazil and King of Portugal; Maria Francisca, Infanta of Spain; Isabel Maria, Infanta Regent of Portugal; Miguel I, King of Portugal; Infanta Maria da Assunção; Infanta Ana de Jesus Maria, Marquise of Loulé
Names
- Portuguese: João Maria José Francisco Xavier de Paula Luís António Domingos Rafael
- House: Braganza
- Father: Peter III of Portugal
- Mother: Maria I of Portugal

Dom John VI (Note: Portuguese: Dom João VI (European Portuguese pronunciation: [ˈdõ ʒʊˈɐ̃w̃ ˈs̺e(j)ʃ.tʊ] Brazilian Portuguese pronunciation: [ˈdõ ʒoˈɐ̃w̃ ˈses.tʊ)]). Sometimes rendered as Joam in the pre-standardized Portuguese spelling.) (Portuguese: João Maria José Francisco Xavier de Paula Luís António Domingos Rafael; 13 May 1767 – 10 March 1826), known as "the Clement" (o Clemente), was King of the United Kingdom of Portugal, Brazil and the Algarves from 1816 to 1825, and after the recognition of Brazil's independence, titular Emperor of Brazil and King of Portugal until his death in 1826. (Note: Although the United Kingdom of Portugal ceased to exist de facto beginning in 1822, he remained its monarch de jure between 1822 and 1825. After the recognition of the independence of Brazil under the Treaty of Rio de Janeiro of 1825, he continued as King of Portugal until his death in 1826. Under the same treaty, he also became titular Emperor of Brazil for life, while his son, Emperor Dom Pedro I, was both de facto and de jure the monarch of the newly independent country.)

John VI was born in Lisbon during the reign of his maternal grandfather, King Dom Joseph I of Portugal. He was the second son of the Princess of Brazil and Infante Peter of Portugal, who later became Queen Dona Maria I and King Dom Peter III. In 1785, John married Carlota Joaquina of Spain, with whom he had nine children. He became heir to the throne when his older brother, Prince José, died of smallpox in 1788. Before his accession to the throne, John bore the titles Duke of Braganza, Duke of Beja, and Prince of Brazil. From 1799, he served as prince regent due to his mother's mental illness. In 1816, he succeeded his mother as monarch of the Portuguese Empire, with no real change in his authority, since he already possessed absolute powers as regent.

One of the last representatives of absolute monarchy in Europe, John lived during a turbulent period; his reign never saw a lasting peace. Throughout his period of rule, major powers such as Spain, France, and Great Britain continually intervened in Portuguese affairs. Forced to flee across the Atlantic Ocean to Brazil when troops of Emperor Napoleon I invaded Portugal, he found himself faced there with liberal revolts; he was compelled to return to Europe amid new conflicts. His marriage was no less conflictual, as his wife Carlota Joaquina repeatedly conspired against John in favor of personal interests or those of her native Spain.

John lost Brazil when his son Pedro declared independence, and his other son Miguel (later Dom Miguel I of Portugal) led a rebellion that sought to depose him. According to recent scholarly research, his death may well have been caused by arsenic poisoning. Notwithstanding these tribulations, John left a lasting mark, especially in Brazil, where he helped to create numerous institutions and services that laid a foundation for national autonomy, and many historians consider him to be a true mastermind of the modern Brazilian state. John's contemporaries viewed him as a kind and benevolent king, although later generations of Portuguese and Brazilians have made him the subject of frequent caricature. However, in recent decades his reputation has been restored as a clever king who was able to balance many competing interests.

== Early life ==
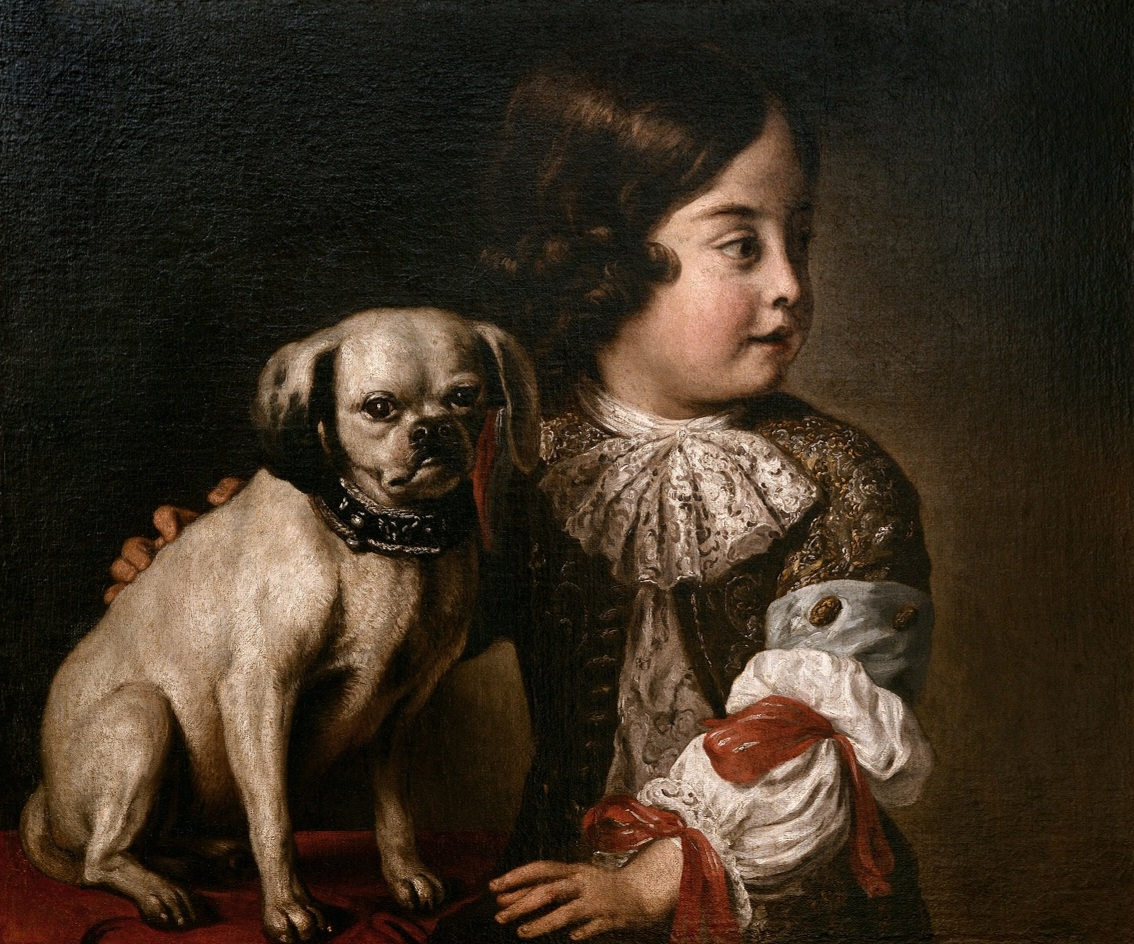
Portrait of Dom John as Infante, aged 5–6, attributed to Cirilo Volkmar Machado, 1773

João Maria José Francisco Xavier de Paula Luís António Domingos Rafael was born 13 May 1767 during the reign of his maternal grandfather, King Dom Joseph I of Portugal. He was the second son of the King's eldest daughter and heir, Dona Maria, Princess of Brazil (later Queen Dona Maria I) and Infante Peter of Portugal (later King Dom Peter III). Peter was not only Maria's husband, but also her paternal uncle.

John was ten years old when his grandfather died and his mother ascended to the throne. His childhood and youth were lived quietly in the shadow of Queen Maria I's older son and heir apparent, José, Prince of Brazil and Duke of Braganza. Folklore has Infante John as a rather uncultured youth, but according to Jorge Pedreira e Costa, he received as rigorous an education as his brother José did. Still, a French ambassador of the time painted him in unfavorable colors, seeing him as hesitant and dim. The record of this period of his life is too vague for historians to form any definitive picture. Little is known of the substance of his education. He surely received instruction in religion, law, French, and etiquette, and would presumably have learned history through reading the works of Duarte Nunes de Leão and João de Barros.

=== Marriage and succession ===
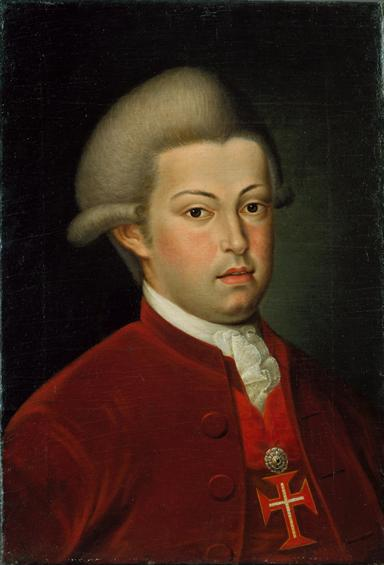
Portrait of John as Prince of Brazil by Giuseppe Troni, c. 1788

In 1785, Henrique de Meneses, 3rd Marquis of Louriçal, arranged a marriage between John and Infanta Carlota Joaquina of Spain, daughter of the Prince and Princess of Asturias (later King Charles IV and Queen Maria Luisa). Fearing a new Iberian Union, some in the Portuguese court viewed John's marriage to a Spanish infanta unfavorably. Carlota Joaquina endured four days of testing by the Portuguese ambassadors before the marriage pact was confirmed. Because John and Carlota Joaquina were related and because of the bride's youth (she was only 10 years old at the time), the marriage required a papal dispensation. They were second cousins, as John's grandmother, Mariana Victoria, was the sister of Carlota's grandfather, King Charles III of Spain. After being confirmed, the marriage capitulation was signed in the throne room of the Spanish court with great pomp and with the participation of both kingdoms. It was followed immediately by a proxy marriage. The marriage was consummated five years later.

Carlota Joaquina was received at the Ducal Palace of Vila Viçosa at the beginning of May 1785, and on 9 June, the couple received a nuptial benediction at the palace chapel. However, the marriage seemed to be an uncomfortable one. An assiduous correspondence between John and Mariana at that time reveals that the absence of his sister weighed upon him and, comparing her to his young wife, he wrote, "She is very smart and has a lot of judgment, whereas you have rather little, and I like her a lot, but for all that I cannot love her equally." John's young bride was not inclined to docility, requiring at times the correction of Queen Maria herself. In addition, the difference in their ages (John being 17 years old) made him uncomfortable and anxious. Because Carlota Joaquina was so young, the marriage had not been consummated, and John wrote, "Here's to the arrival of the time when I shall play a lot with the Infanta. The way these things go, I think six years from now. Better that she be a bit more grown up than when she came." The consummation waited until 1790. In 1793, Carlota Joaquina gave birth to the first of nine children: Teresa, Princess of Beira.

The death of John's older brother, José, on 11 September 1788, left John as the heir apparent to the throne, with the titles of Prince of Brazil and Duke of Braganza. Great things had been hoped for from José, who associated himself with the progressive ideas of the Enlightenment and appeared to have been inclined toward the anti-clerical policies of Sebastião José de Carvalho e Melo, 1st Marquis of Pombal.

John, in contrast, was well known for his religiosity and his attachment to absolutism. The crisis of succession was aggravated with the death in November 1788 of the Queen's confessor, Inácio de São Caetano, the titular archbishop of Thessalonica. The Archbishop had been a powerful political figure, influencing a controversial choice of the Queen's ministers that favored John, but not without encountering strong opposition from important fidalgos who had ambitions for those posts. In the year after the deaths of his brother and the Archbishop, John became ill to the extent that his own survival was uncertain. He recovered, but in 1791, he again fell ill "bleeding from the mouth and intestines", according to notes left by the chaplain of the Marquis of Marialva, who added that John's spirit was always depressed. This created a tense climate and uncertainty about his future reign.

== Regency ==
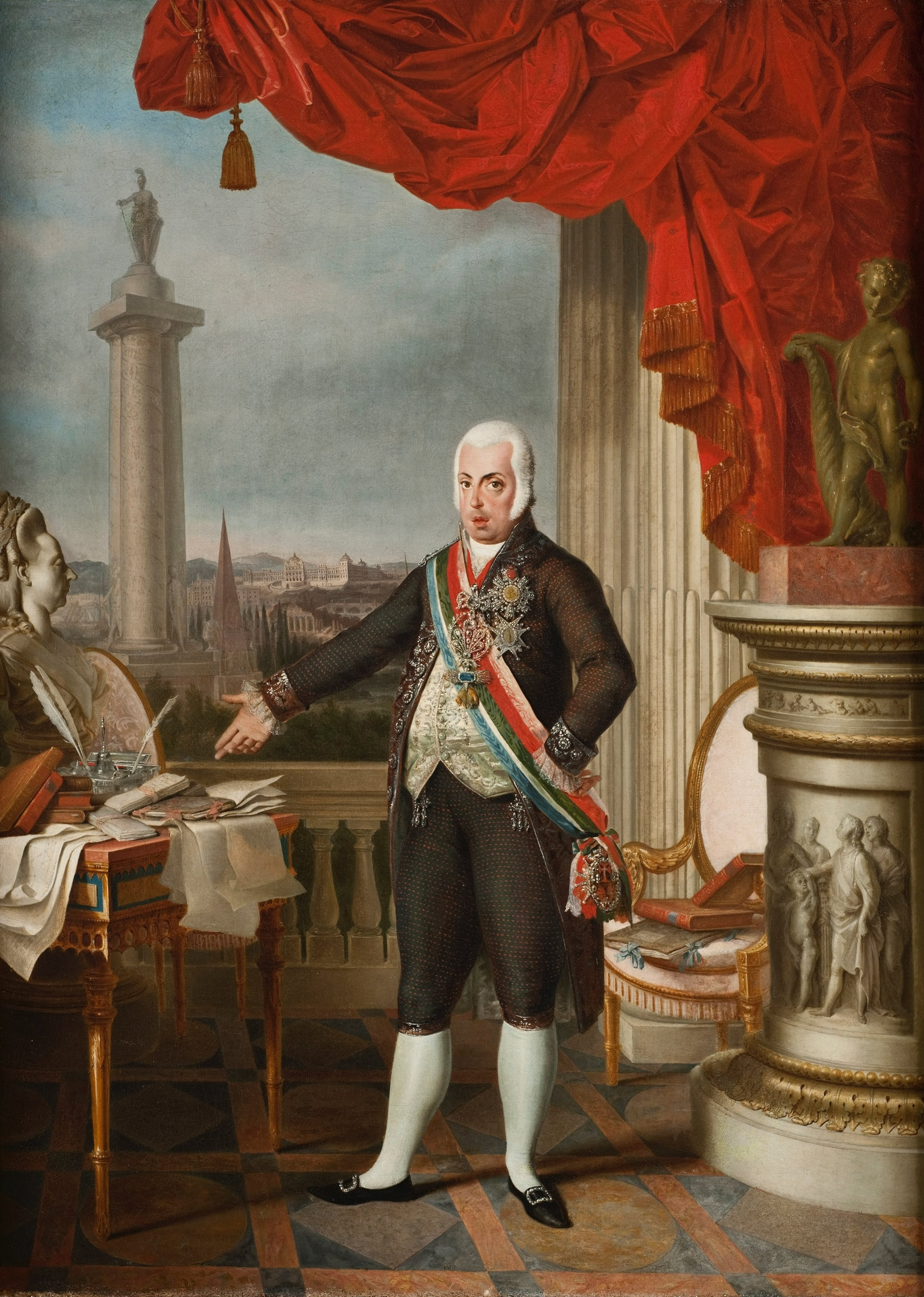
The Prince Regent of Portugal, Dom John, with a bust of his mother, Dona Maria I (Sequeira, 1802)

Meanwhile, the Queen showed increasing signs of mental instability. As a result, of her illness, the queen was deemed unfit to rule and John essentially took control of the country. John was reluctant to take the reins of power, rejecting the idea of a formal regency. This opened the way for elements of the nobility to form a de facto government via a Council. Rumors circulated that John exhibited symptoms of the same insanity, and that he might be prevented from ruling. According to longstanding laws that guided the institution of regency, were the regent to die or become incapable for any reason, and having children of less than fourteen years (which was John's situation at the time), government would be exercised by the guardians of those children or, if guardians had not been formally named, by the wife of the regent. In John's case, that would have been a Spanish infanta. Fear, suspicion and intrigue engulfed the entire institutional framework of the nation.

At the same time, the French Revolution perplexed and horrified the reigning houses of Europe. In January 1793, the revolutionaries executed their former king Louis XVI, precipitating an international response. On 15 July, Portugal signed a treaty with Spain, and on 26 September allied itself with Great Britain. Both treaties pledged mutual aid against revolutionary France and brought six thousand Portuguese soldiers into the War of the Pyrenees (1793–1795), a campaign that began with an advance to Roussillon in France and ended in defeat with the French conquest of northeastern Spain. This created a delicate diplomatic problem, as Portugal could not make peace with France without damaging an alliance with Britain that involved several overseas interests. The Portuguese thus sought a neutrality that proved fragile and tense.

After the defeat, Spain abandoned its alliance with Portugal and allied with France under the Peace of Basel. With Britain too powerful for France to attack directly, France set its sights on Portugal. In 1799, John officially assumed the reins of government as prince regent in the name of his mother; that same year, Napoleon Bonaparte staged his coup d'état of 18 Brumaire in France and coerced Spain into issuing an ultimatum to force the Portuguese to break with Great Britain and submit the country to the interests of Napoleon. With John's refusal, neutrality became unviable. Spain and France invaded in 1801, setting off the War of the Oranges; a defeated Portugal signed the Treaty of Badajoz and the subsequent Treaty of Madrid, under which it ceded territory to Spain, in particular Olivenza, and made concessions to the French over certain colonial territories. With conflicting interests among all the countries involved, the war was marked by ambiguous movements and secret agreements. Portugal, as the weakest player, could not avoid continued struggle. At the same time, John had to face an enemy at home. His wife, Princess Carlota Joaquina, loyal to Spanish interests, initiated an intrigue with the objective of deposing her husband and taking power herself. After this attempt failed in 1805, the Princess was exiled from court; she resided at Queluz Palace, while John took up residency at Mafra Palace. It was events like this that led to the Portuguese people questioning if John was capable of commanding the nation and whether he was as incapable of ruling as his mother was.

=== Flight to Brazil ===
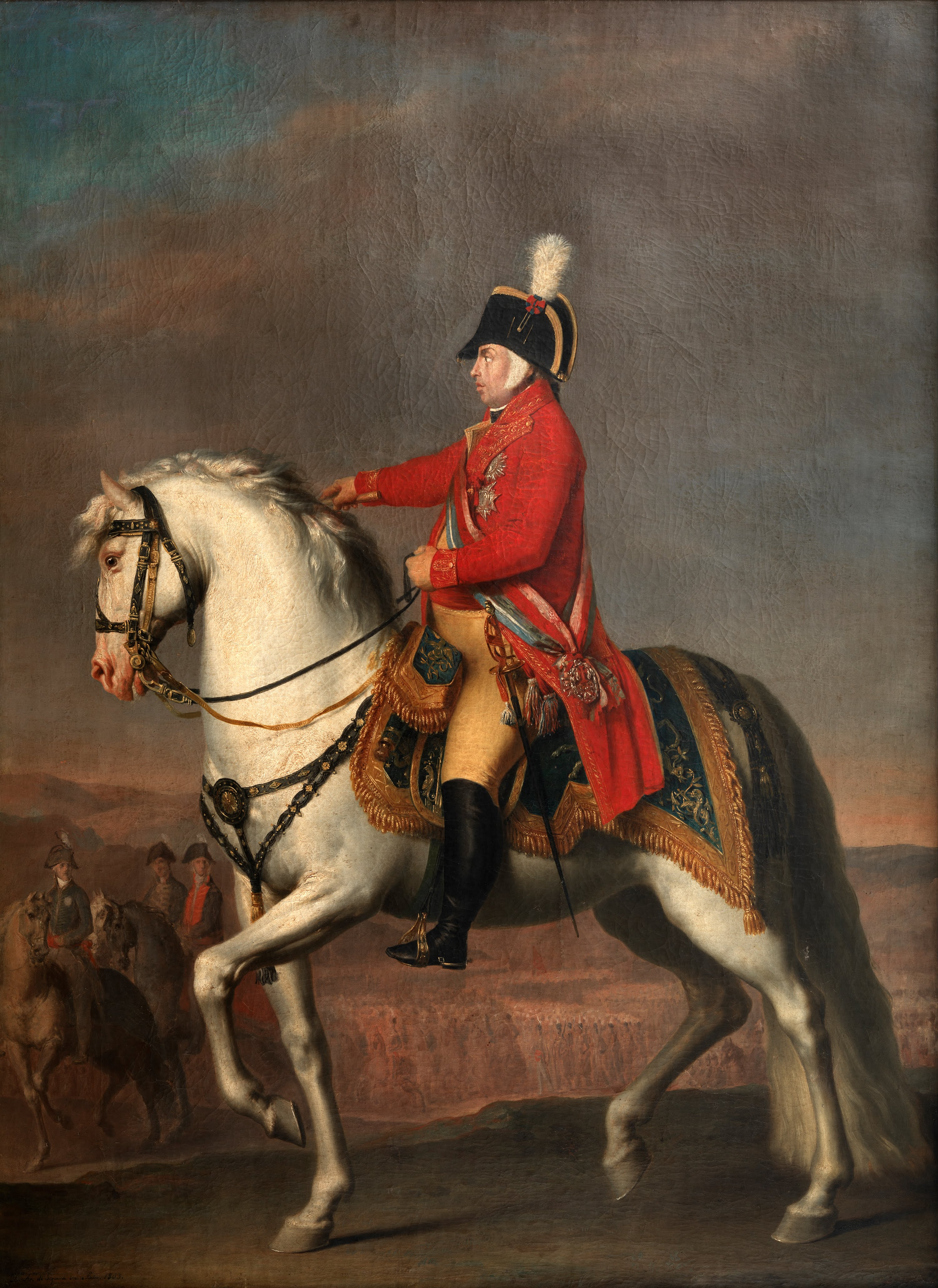
The Prince Regent reviewing the troops at Azambuja (Sequeira, 1803)

John played a desperate game with France for time. For as long as he could, he pretended an apparent submission to France, to the point of suggesting to King George III of the United Kingdom the declaration of a fictitious state of war between their countries, but he did not obey the dictates of Napoleon's Continental System (a blockade against Great Britain). A new secret treaty with the British guaranteed him help in case of an eventual flight of the royal family. The accord greatly favored the British and preserved their influence over the country, as British merchants continued to make vast profits in trade with the Portuguese intercontinental empire. It fell to Portugal to choose between an alliance with France or with Britain, and the hesitancy to decide firmly placed Portugal at risk of war with both. In October 1807, news arrived that a French army was approaching, and on 16 November, a British squadron arrived in the port of Lisbon with a force of seven thousand men with orders either to escort the royal family to Brazil or, if the government surrendered to France, to attack and conquer the Portuguese capital. The court was divided between Francophiles and Anglophiles, and after anguished consideration under pressure from both sides, John decided to accept British protection and leave for Brazil.

The invading army led by Jean-Andoche Junot advanced with some difficulty, arriving at the gates of Lisbon only on 30 November 1807. By this time, the Prince Regent, accompanied by the entire royal family and a large following of nobles, state functionaries and servants, had already embarked, leaving the government under a regency with the recommendation that the army not engage in hostilities with the invader. The hasty departure during a rainstorm caused havoc in Lisbon as an astonished population could not believe that their prince had abandoned them. According to the account of José Acúrsio das Neves, the departure brought forth deep emotion on the part of the Prince Regent:

He wanted to speak and could not; he wanted to move and, convulsed, did not succeed in taking a step; he walked over an abyss, and envisioned a future dark and as uncertain as the ocean to which he was about to deliver himself. Country, capital, kingdom, vassals, he was about to leave all of these suddenly, with little hope of setting eyes on them again, and all were thorns that pierced his heart.

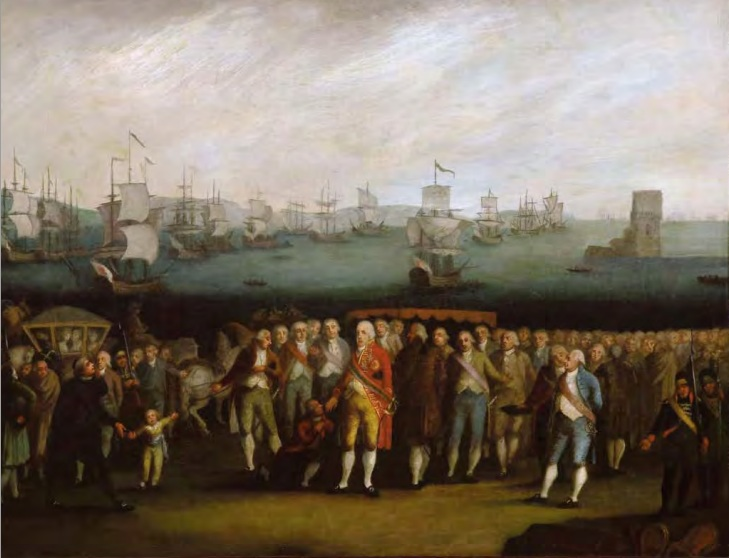
The Embarkation of John VI and the Royal Family (1810)

To explain himself to the people, John ordered that posters be put up along the streets stating that his departure was unavoidable despite all efforts made to assure the integrity and peace of the Kingdom. The posters recommended that everyone remain calm, orderly and not resist the invaders, so that blood not be shed in vain. Because of the rush to depart, the Prince Regent was in a ship together with his mother and his sons Pedro, Prince of Beira (later Emperor Dom Pedro I of Brazil and King Dom Pedro IV of Portugal), and Miguel (later King Dom Miguel I). This was an imprudent decision given the dangers of a transatlantic voyage in that era, since it placed at risk the succession of the crown in case of shipwreck. Carlota Joaquina and her daughters were on two other ships. The number of people who embarked with John remains a matter of controversy; in the 19th century there was talk of up to 30 thousand emigrants; more recent estimates vary between five hundred and fifteen thousand, the latter being close to the maximum capacity of the squadron of fifteen ships, including their crews. Still, the ships were overcrowded. According to Pedreira e Costa, taking into account all of the variables, the most likely numbers fall between four and seven thousand passengers plus the crews. Many families were separated, and even high officials failed to secure a place on the ships and were left behind. The voyage was not a tranquil one. Several ships were in precarious condition, and overcrowding created humiliating conditions for the nobility, the majority of whom had to sleep huddled in the open in the poops. Hygienic conditions were bad, including an epidemic of head lice. Many had failed to bring changes of clothing. Several people fell ill. Supplies were scarce, causing rationing. The flotilla spent ten days nearly becalmed in the equatorial zone under a scorching heat that caused moods to turn quite sour. The flotilla also faced two storms and was eventually dispersed near Madeira. In the middle of the voyage, Prince John changed his plans and decided to head for Salvador, Bahia, probably for political reasons. He wanted to please the inhabitants of the colony's first capital, which had given many signs of discontent with the loss of its old status. The ships carrying his wife and daughters held to the original destination of Rio de Janeiro.

=== Colonial Transformation ===
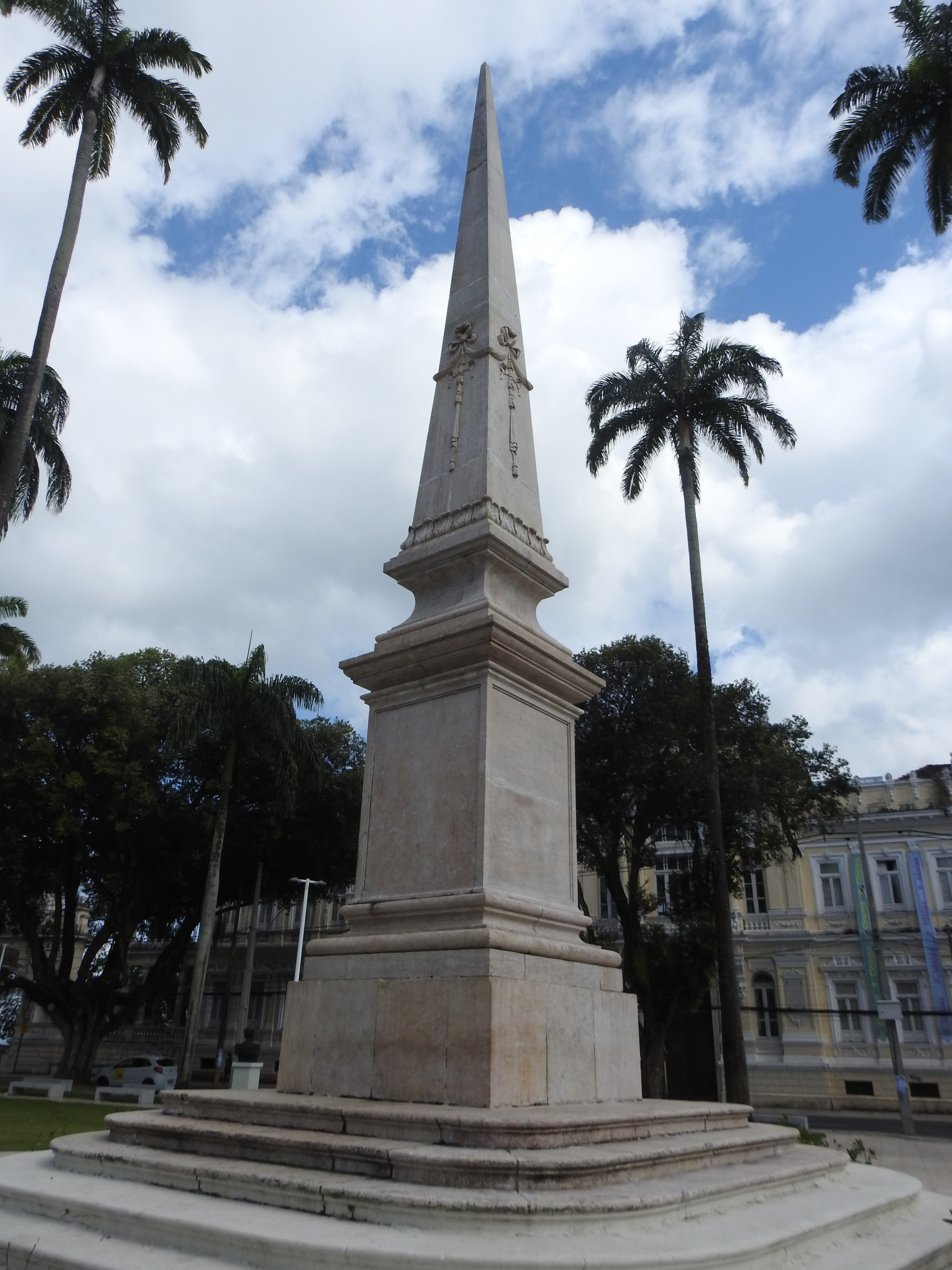
Monument to the Prince Regent, erected in 1815 in Salvador, Brazil

On 22 January 1808, the Prince Regent's ship and the two others arrived in Baía de Todos os Santos, Brazil. The streets of Salvador were deserted, because the governor, the Count of Ponte, preferred to await the prince's orders before permitting the people to receive him. Finding this attitude odd, John ordered that all could come as they wished. However, to allow the nobility to compose themselves after such an arduous journey, the landing was postponed until the next day, when they were received joyfully amidst a procession, the ringing of bells and a celebration of a Te Deum at the Cathedral of Salvador. In the following days, John received all who wished to give homage, granting the ceremony of the beija-mão (the kissing of the monarch's hand) and conceding various mercies. Among the latter, he decreed the creation of a public lecture series on economics and a school of surgery, but his most decisive action at this moment was the Decree of Opening the Ports to Friendly Nations (Decreto de Abertura dos Portos às Nações Amigas), a measure of vast political and economic importance and the first of many that went to improve conditions in the colony. Britain, however, whose economy depended in great part on maritime commerce, and for whom the Portuguese and Brazilian monarchy was now something of a protectorate, was the most direct beneficiary.

Salvador spent a month in commemorations of the presence of the court and tried to seduce the court into making it the new seat of the Kingdom. The residents offered to construct a luxurious palace as a home for the royal family, but John declined and continued his voyage, having already announced to various nations his intention to make his capital at Rio de Janeiro. His ship entered Guanabara Bay on 7 March, where he met his daughters and other members of his entourage whose ships had arrived earlier. On the 8th, the whole court finally disembarked to encounter a city adorned to receive them with nine days of uninterrupted celebrations. A well-known chronicler of the era, Father Perereca, eyewitness to the arrival, while lamenting the news of the invasion of metropolitan Portugal, also intuited the significance of the arrival of the court on Brazilian soil:

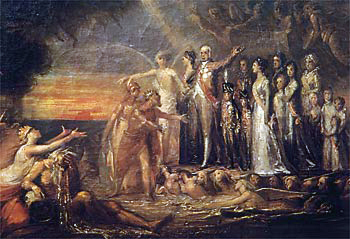
Allegory of the arrival of Prince John and his family in Brazil

If so great were the motives of sorrow and distress, no less were the causes of comfort and pleasure: a new order of things was going to begin this part of the southern hemisphere. The design of the Empire of Brazil could already be considered in place, and eagerly wished the powerful hand of our lord the Prince Regent to cast the first stone of future greatness, prosperity and power of the new empire.

John helped change Brazil from an ordinary colony into a booming society. This was done, in large part, to the establishment of a new government in the capital, Rio de Janeiro. With a government, the essential apparatus of a sovereign state became inevitable: the senior civil, religious, and military officials, aristocrats and liberal professionals, skilled artisans, and public servants. For many scholars, the transfer of the court to Rio began the establishment of the modern Brazilian state and constituted Brazil's first step toward true independence. While Brazil at this time remained formally and juridically a Portuguese colony, in the words of Caio Prado Jr.

"Establishing in Brazil the seat of a monarchy, the regent ipso facto abolished the colonial regime under which the country had lived until then. All the characteristics of that [colonial] regime disappeared, the only remaining part of the colonial situation was to be under a foreign government. One after another, the old workings of colonial administration were abolished and replaced by those of a sovereign nation. Economic restrictions fell and thoughts of the country's interests moved to the front of government policy."

But first it was necessary to provide accommodations for the newcomers, a difficult problem to resolve given the cramped proportions of the city of Rio at that time. In particular, there were few homes suitable for the nobility, especially in the case of the royal family, who were installed in the viceregal palace, known today as the Paço Imperial (Imperial Palace). Though large, it was comfortless and nothing like Portuguese palaces. As large as it was, it was not enough to accommodate everyone, so neighboring buildings were also requisitioned, such as the Carmelite Convent, the town hall, and even the jail. To meet the needs of other nobles, and to install new government offices, innumerable small residences were hastily expropriated, their proprietors arbitrarily ejected, at times violently in the face of resistance. Despite the efforts of Viceroy Marcos de Noronha e Brito and of Joaquim José de Azevedo, the regent was still poorly accommodated. Merchant Elias Antônio Lopes offered his country house, the Quinta da Boa Vista, a sumptuous villa in excellent location that immediately met with the prince's satisfaction. Renovations and expansion transformed this into the Paço de São Cristóvão ("Palace of Saint Christopher"). Carlota Joaquina, for her part, preferred to settle on a farm near the beach of Botafogo, continuing her habit of living apart from her husband.

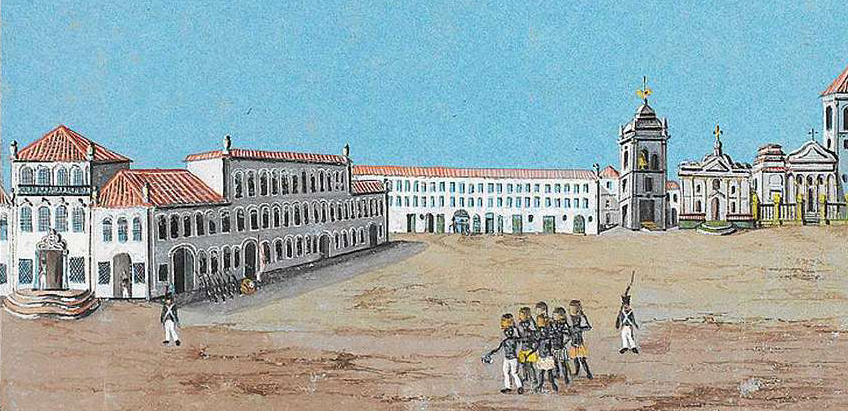
The Largo do Carmo (now the site of Rio's Praça XV de Novembro) a few years after arrival of the court

The city, which at that time had about 70,000 inhabitants, saw itself transformed overnight. The additional populace, full of new requirements, imposed a new organization in the supply of food and other consumer goods, including luxury items. It took years for the Portuguese to settle in, causing years of chaos in the daily life of Rio; rents doubled, taxes rose, and food was in short supply, requisitioned by the imported nobility. This soon dispelled popular enthusiasm over the prince regent's arrival. The very shape of the city began to change, with the construction of innumerable new residences, villas and other buildings, and various improvements to services and infrastructure. Likewise, the presence of the court introduced new standards of etiquette, new fashions and new customs, including a new social stratification.

Among the customs, John continued in Brazil the ancient Portuguese ceremony of the beija-mão, which he esteemed greatly and which fascinated the Brazilians and became part of their folklore. He received his subjects daily, except for Sundays and holidays. The long lines waiting to pay their respects and receive favors were a mix of nobles and commoners. According to painter Henry L'Evêque, "the Prince, accompanied by a Secretary of State, a Chamberlain and some household officials, received all the petitions that were presented to him; listened attentively to all the complaints, all the requests of the applicants; consoled one, encouraged others.... The vulgarity of the manners, the familiarity of speech, the insistence of some, the prolixity of others, none of this bored him. He seemed to forget that he was their master, and remember only that he was their father." Oliveira Lima wrote that he "never confused the faces or the pleas, and the applicants marveled at how well he know their lives, their families, even small incidents that had occurred in the past and which they could not believe had risen to the notice of the King."

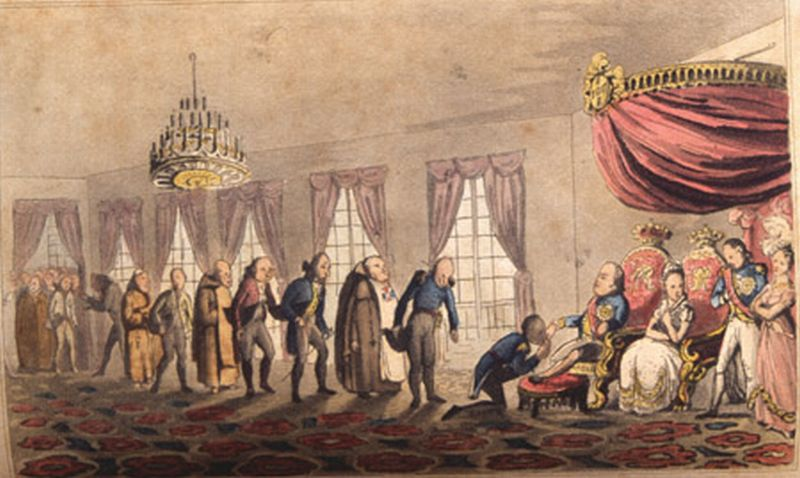
The ceremony of the beija-mão (hand-kissing) in John's Brazilian court, maintaining a custom of the Portuguese monarchs.

Throughout his stay in Brazil, John formalized the creation of a huge number of institutions and public services and boosted the economy, culture and other areas of national life. All these measures were taken principally because of the practical needs of administering a large empire in a territory previously lacking of these resources, because the predominant idea continued to be that Brazil would remain a colony, given that it was expected that the court would return to its old metropolis once the European political situation returned to normal. However, these advances became the basis for Brazil's future autonomy. This is not to say that all was amenities and progress. A series of political crises began shortly after the Prince Regent's arrival with the invasion of Cayenne in French Guiana in 1809 in retaliation for the French invasion of Portugal, serious economic problems, and an unfavorable trade agreement negotiated in 1810 with the British government, which in practice flooded the small internal market with useless trinkets, disadvantaged exports, and the creation of new national industries. Laurentino Gomes writes that John granted more hereditary titles in his first eight years in Brazil than had been granted in the previous three hundred years of the Portuguese monarchy, not even counting more than five thousand insignia and commendations of the honorific orders of Portugal.

When Napoleon was defeated in 1815, the European powers held the Congress of Vienna to reorganize the political map of the continent. Portugal participated in these negotiations, but given British overtures contrary to the interests of the House of Braganza, Portugal's ambassador to the Congress, the Count of Palmela, counseled the regent to remain in Brazil, as did the powerful Prince Talleyrand, in order to strengthen the ties between metropolis and colony, including the suggestion to elevate Brazil to the condition of a kingdom united to Portugal. The British representative to the Congress also ended up supporting the idea, which resulted in the effective foundation of the United Kingdom of Portugal, Brazil and the Algarves on 16 December 1815, a juridical institution rapidly recognized by other nations.

== Accession to the throne ==
=== Road to rule ===
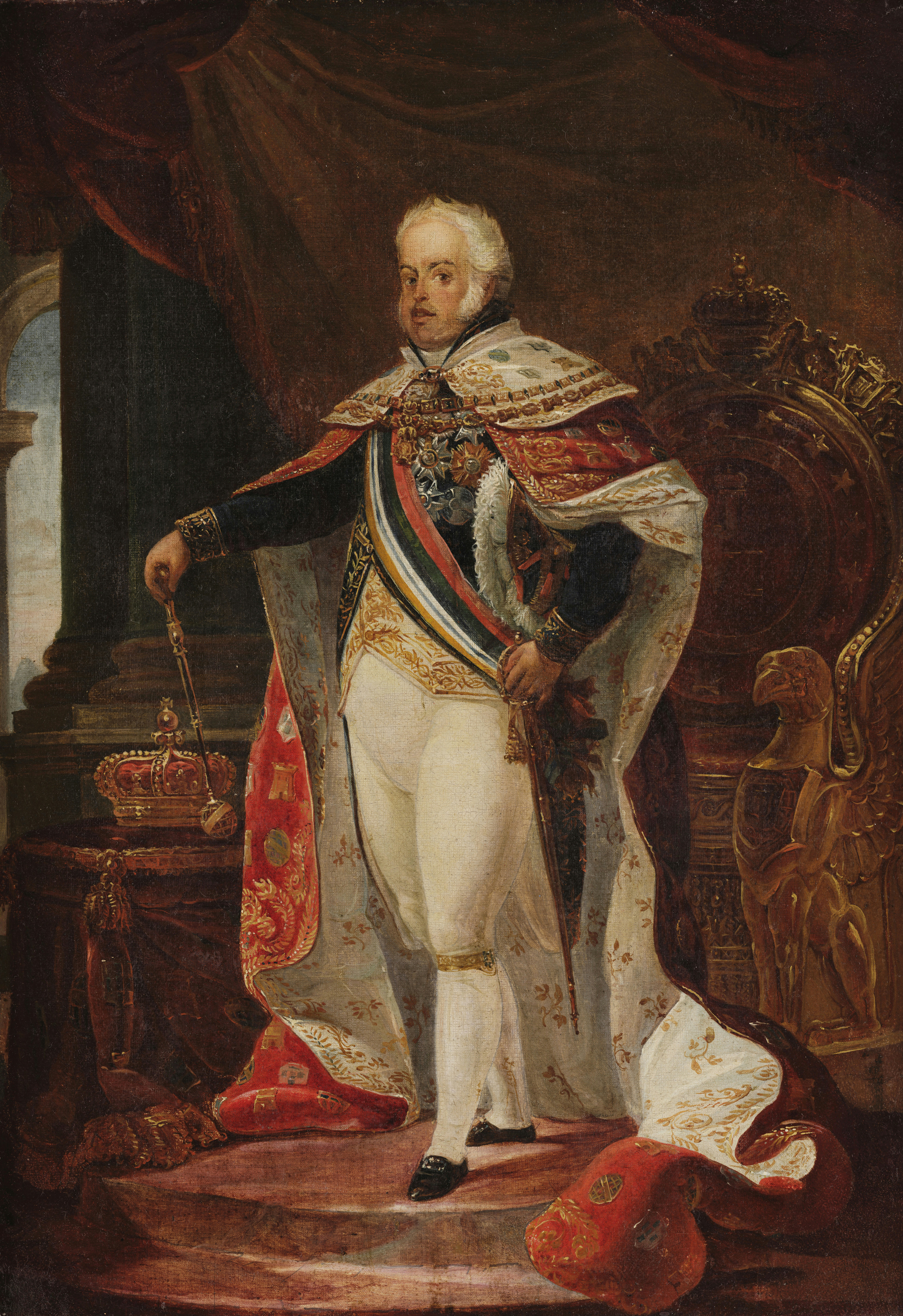
John VI dressed for his acclamation as king (Jean-Baptiste Debret)

With the death of his mother on 20 March 1816, John assumed the throne as King Dom John VI. However, he was not immediately consecrated as king; he was acclaimed only on 6 February 1818, with grand festivities. Meanwhile, several political matters came to the fore. John's wife, the ambitious Carlota Joaquina, had begun to conspire against Portuguese interests while still in Europe. Shortly after her arrival in Brazil, she established understandings with both Spaniards and with nationalists of the Río de la Plata region (now Argentina and Uruguay) to try to secure a monarchy of her own, perhaps as a regent of Spain, perhaps as queen of a new monarchy created from Spanish colonies in South America, perhaps by deposing her husband. This made any meaningful marriage to John impossible, despite his show of patience, and only the force of convention had them appear together in public. While the Queen gained many sympathizers, her plots uniformly failed. Despite that, she managed to influence her husband to involve himself more directly in Spanish colonial politics. These efforts led to the capture of Montevideo in 1817 and the annexation of Cisplatina Province in 1821.

During the same period, problems arose in finding a wife for John's son Dom Pedro, Prince Royal of Portugal (the new title for the heir apparent). Europe at the time considered Brazil distant, backward and unsafe, so it was not a simple task to find suitable candidates. After a year of seeking, the ambassador Pedro José Joaquim Vito de Meneses Coutinho, 6th Marquis of Marialva, finally secured an alliance with one of Europe's most powerful royal houses, the Austrian Habsburgs, after seducing the Austrian court with numerous lies, a display of pomp, and the distribution of gold bars and diamonds among the nobility. Dom Pedro married Archduchess Maria Leopoldina of Austria, daughter of Emperor Francis I, in 1817. The Emperor and his minister Metternich considered the alliance "an advantageous pact between Europe and the New World," strengthening the monarchical regime in both hemispheres and granting Austria a new sphere of influence.

Meanwhile, the situation in Portugal was by no means tranquil. With the King absent and the country devastated by the Peninsular War and the consequent mass hunger and enormous exodus of emigrants, Portugal became a de facto British protectorate upon the final expulsion of the French. It was administered by William Carr Beresford, who took a high hand in his dealings with the Portuguese government. From the time John ascended the throne, the Portuguese pressed for his return, initiated liberal rebellions, and formed secret societies with the objective of bringing into session the Portuguese Cortes, which had not met since 1698. Similar liberal agitation occurred in Brazil. In 1817, the Pernambucan Revolt broke out in Recife, a republican movement that established a provisional government in Pernambuco and spread into other Brazilian states; it was put down severely. Back in Portugal, the Liberal Revolution of 1820 broke out in Porto on 24 August 1820. A governing junta was set up, with repercussions in Lisbon. It met as the General Extraordinary and Constituent Cortes (Cortes Gerais Extraordinárias e Constituintes), formed a government and convened elections for deputies without bothering to consult King John. The movement gained support from the Island of Madeira, the Azores and reached the captaincy of Grão-Pará and Bahia in Brazil. It led even to an uprising by the military garrison of Rio de Janeiro itself.

On 30 January 1821, the Cortes met in Lisbon and decreed the formation of a Council of Regency to exercise power in the name of King John. It freed many political prisoners and demanded the King's immediate return. On 20 April, John convoked a meeting in Rio to choose deputies to the Constituent Cortes, but the following day, protests in the plaza were put down violently. In Brazil, the general opinion was that the King's return to Portugal could mean loss of the autonomy Brazil had gained and a return to its prior colonial status. Under pressure, John tried to find a middle way by sending his son Prince Pedro to Lisbon to grant a constitution and establish the basis of a new government. The prince, however, already leaning toward liberal ideas, refused. The crisis had gone too far and there was no turning back. John named Pedro regent for Brazil in his name and left for Lisbon on 25 April 1821 after a stay of thirteen years in Brazil, a country he would always miss.

=== Reign ===
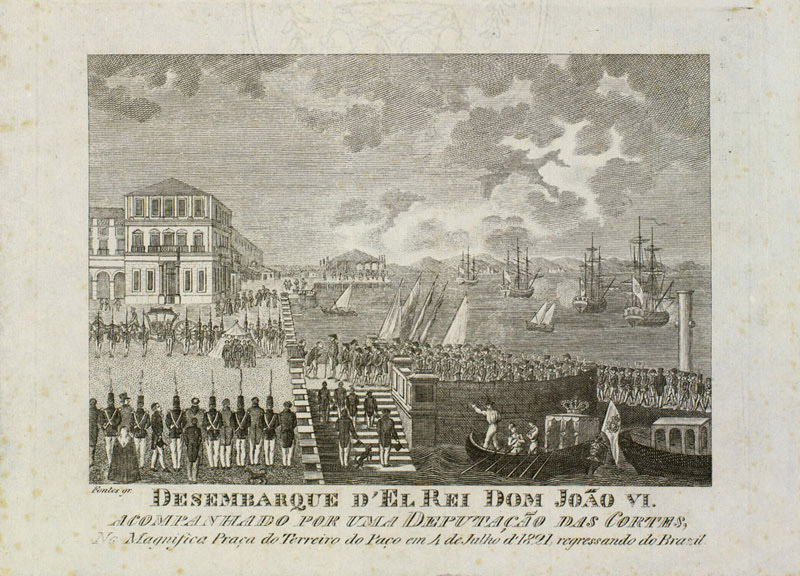
John disembarks in Lisbon

The ships bringing John and his court arrived in Lisbon on 3 July. His return was orchestrated in such a manner as not to imply that the King had been coerced, but in fact a new political environment had already been established. A constitution had been drafted, and the King was required to swear loyalty to it on 1 October 1822. It called for him to surrender various prerogatives. The Queen refused to follow her husband in agreeing to this, and thus was dispossessed of her political rights and deposed of her title as queen. Meanwhile, John lost out in Brazil as well. His son Pedro, opting to stay in that country, led a revolt that proclaimed Brazilian independence on 1822-09-07; as part of this action, he assumed the title of emperor of Brazil. Tradition says that before journeying to Portugal, John had anticipated future events and had said to his son: "Pedro, Brazil will soon be separated from Portugal: if so, put the crown on your head before some adventurer grabs it." According to the memoirs of the Count of Palmela, Brazilian independence had come about through common accord between King John and Prince Pedro. In any event, later correspondence between the two shows the prince's concern not to disturb his father. However, Portugal did not officially recognize Brazilian independence at this time.

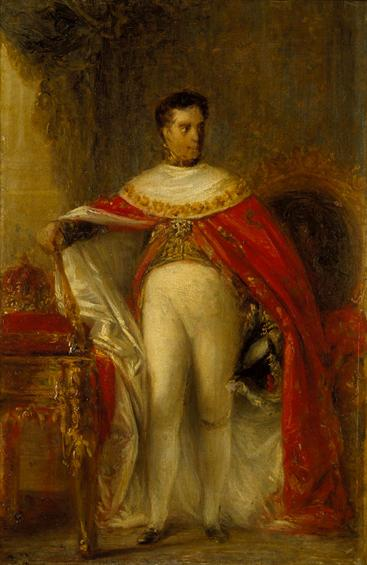
Portrait by Sequeira, 1821

The liberal constitution to which the King had sworn loyalty was in effect only for a few months. Not everyone in Portugal supported liberalism, and an absolutist movement arose. On 23 February 1823 in Trás-os-Montes, Francisco Silveira, Count of Amarante, proclaimed an absolute monarchy; this did not immediately have an effect, and new agitations followed. The King's younger son, Miguel, instigated by his mother Carlota Joaquina, led another revolt known as the Vilafrancada on 27 May, with the intent of restoring absolutism. John changed the game by supporting Miguel to avoid his own deposition (which was desired by Carlota Joaquina's party). He appeared in public on his birthday alongside his son, who wore a uniform of the National Guard, a military corps that had been disbanded by the liberals, receiving the applause of the militia. The King personally went to Vila Franca to better administer the uprising, ultimately returning to Lisbon in triumph. The political climate was undecided, and even the staunchest defenders of liberalism feared to take a strong stand on its behalf. Before its dissolution, the Cortes protested against any change in the recently approved constitution, but the absolute regime was restored, the Queen's rights re-established, and the King acclaimed for a second time on 5 June. John repressed demonstrations against this restoration, deported some of the liberals and arrested others, ordered the restoration of judiciary and institutions more in line with the new political orientation and created a commission to draft a basis for a new charter to replace the constitution.

John's alliance with Infante Miguel did not bear fruit. Influenced as always by his mother, Miguel led the April Revolt or Abrilada by the Lisbon military garrison on 29 April 1824. The revolt started on the pretext of crushing the Freemasons and defending the King from threats of death that the Masons had supposedly made against him, but John was taken into custody at the Bemposta Palace, while several of Miguel's political enemies were also imprisoned elsewhere. The infante's intent was to force his father to abdicate. Alerted to the situation, the diplomatic corps managed to enter Bemposta Palace. Those who held the King could not resist such authorities and restored a measure of freedom to the King. On 9 May, on the advice of friendly ambassadors, John pretended to travel to Caxias but, in fact, went and sought refuge with a British fleet anchored in the port. From aboard the Royal Navy ship Windsor Castle, he reprimanded his son, deposed him from command of the army, and ordered him to release his political prisoners. Miguel was exiled. With the defeat of the rebellion, both liberals and absolutists came out into the streets to celebrate the survival of the legitimate government. On 14 May, the King returned to Bemposta, reconstituted the council of ministers and showed generosity to the others who had rebelled. Still, this did not dissuade the Queen from further conspiracies. The police discovered another rebellion planned for 26 October, on the basis of which John placed his wife under house arrest in Queluz Palace.

=== Final years ===
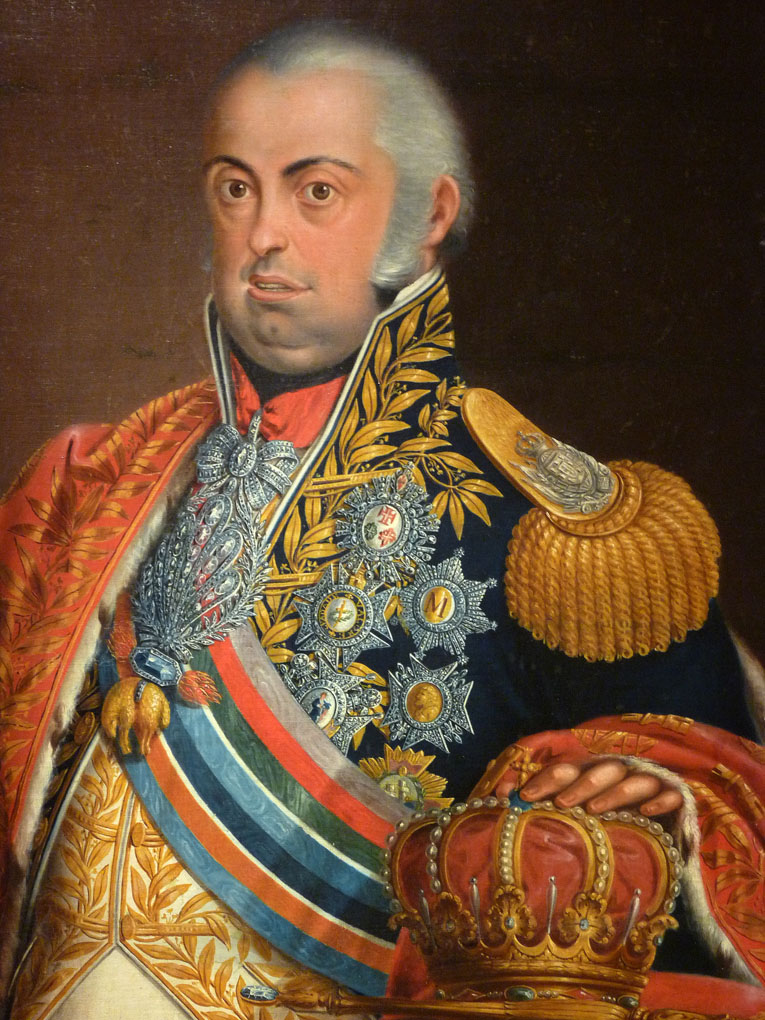
Portrait by José Leandro de Carvalho, c. 1818

At the end of his reign, John ordered the creation of a free port in Lisbon, but the measure was not implemented. He ordered further inquiry into the death of his former friend the Marquis of Loulé, but final judgment was never rendered. On 5 June he granted amnesty to those involved in the Porto uprising, except for nine officers who were exiled. On the same day, the old constitution of the Kingdom came back into force, and the Cortes reconvened to prepare a new text. The change of constitution faced several obstacles, mainly from Spain and from supporters of the Queen.

Portugal's biggest problems at this time, however, related to the independence of Brazil, which had been the country's largest source of wealth. The loss of Brazil had a great negative impact on the Portuguese economy. An expedition to reconquer the former colony was even considered, but the idea was soon abandoned. Difficult negotiations and consultations undertaken in Europe in Rio de Janeiro with British diplomatic mediation resulted in the final recognition of the independence on 29 August 1825. At the same time, John freed all the Brazilians who were prisoners and authorized trade between both nations. It was agreed that Pedro would govern Brazil as Emperor, while John kept for himself the honor of Titular Emperor of Brazil; from this time, he signed official documents as "His Majesty the Emperor and King Dom John VI" ("Sua Majestade o Imperador e Rei Dom João VI"). Brazil was required to pay certain funds that it had borrowed from Portugal. Nothing in the treaty spoke of the succession of the two crowns, but Pedro, still acting as the Prince Royal of Portugal and Algarve, implicitly remained heir to the Portuguese throne.

On 4 March 1826, John returned from the Hieronymites Monastery where he had lunched and retired to Bemposta Palace feeling poorly. He was racked for several days by symptoms including vomiting and convulsions. He appeared to be getting better, but by way of prudence designated his daughter Infanta Isabel Maria as regent. On the night of 9 March, he took a turn for the worse and died at approximately 5 a.m. on 10 March. The infanta immediately assumed the internal government of Portugal, and Pedro was recognized as the legitimate heir as King Dom Pedro IV. Doctors could not definitively determine a cause of death, but it was suspected that John had been poisoned. His body was embalmed and buried in the mausoleum of the Kings of Portugal, the Royal Pantheon of the House of Braganza, in the Monastery of São Vicente de Fora. In the 1990s, a team of investigators exhumed the Chinese ceramic pot that contained his bowels. Fragments of his heart were rehydrated and submitted to an analysis that detected enough arsenic to kill two people, confirming longstanding suspicions of assassination by poison.

== Private life ==
Portrait of John VI of Portugal and Carlota Joaquina of Spain by Manuel Dias de Oliveira, 1815

As a youth, John was a retiring figure, heavily influenced by the clergy, and lived surrounded by priests and attending daily Mass in the church. Nonetheless, Oliveira Lima affirms that rather than being an expression of personal piety, this merely reflected Portuguese culture at that time, and that the King

"...understood that the Church, with its body of traditions and its moral discipline, could only be useful for a good government in his manner, paternal and exclusive, of populations whose dominion was inherited with the scepter. Because of this, he was repeatedly the guest of monks and patron to composers of sacred music, but none of these Epicurean or artistic demonstrations compromised his free thought or denatured his skeptical tolerance. ... He made more use of the refectory of the monastery than of its chapel, because [the latter] was about observance and in [the former] one thought of gastronomy, and in terms of observance the pragmatic one was enough for him. In the Royal Chapel he more took pleasure with the senses than he prayed with the spirit: andantes took the place of meditations."

John had a great appreciation of sacred music and was a great reader of works about art, but he detested physical activity. He appeared to have suffered periodic crises of depression. An aversion to changes in his routine extended to his clothing: he wore the same coat until it tore, forcing his chamberlains to sew it on his body while he slept in it. He suffered from panic attacks when he heard thunder, staying in his rooms with the windows shut and receiving no one.

John's marriage was never a happy one. Rumors circulated that at the age of 25 he fell in love with Eugênia José de Menezes, his wife's chaperone. She became pregnant, and John was suspected of being the father. The case was hushed up, and the young woman was sent to Spain to bear the child. She gave birth to a daughter, whose name is unknown. The mother lived the rest of her life in nunneries and John supported her financially.

In the precarious and spare environment of Rio, the King's personal habits were simple. In contrast to his relative isolation in Portugal, he became more personally dynamic and interested in nature. He moved frequently between the Paço de São Cristóvão and the viceregal palace in the city, staying also at times at Paquetá Island, Governador Island, at Praia Grande (the beach at Niterói), and at the House of Santa Cruz. He went hunting and happily slept in a tent or under a tree. He liked the countryside, despite the swarms of mosquitoes and other pests and the scorching heat of the tropics that were detested by the majority of the Portuguese and other foreigners.

== Legacy ==
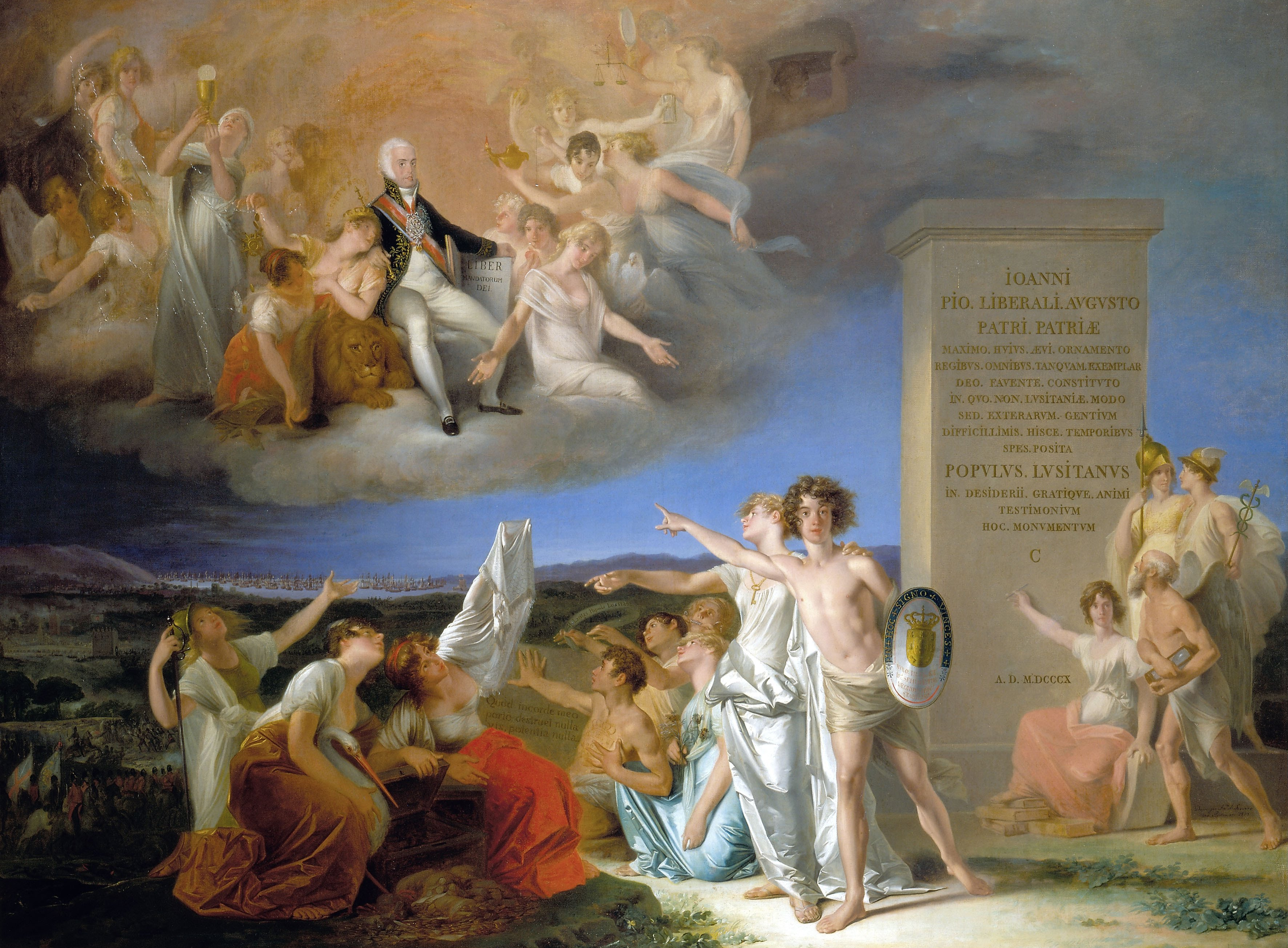
Allegory of the virtues of Prince Regent João by Domingos Sequeira, 1810

In the course of his few years living in Brazil, John ordered the creation of a series of institutions, projects and services that brought the country immense economic, administrative, juridical, scientific, cultural, artistic and other benefits, although not all went successfully, and some were downright dysfunctional or unnecessary, as Hipólito José da Costa mordantly observed. Among these, he was responsible for establishing the Imprensa Régia (the country's first publishing house), the Rio de Janeiro Botanical Garden the Navy Arsenal, the Fábrica de Pólvora (gunpowder factory), Rio's fire department, Brazil's merchant marine, and the charity hospital known as the Casa dos Expostos. He also established various educational programs in Rio, Pernambuco, Bahia and other places, teaching such subjects as dogmatic and moral theology, integral calculus, mechanics, hydrodynamics, chemistry, arithmetic, geometry, French, English, botany and agriculture, among others. He instigated the foundation of various societies and academies for scientific, literary and artistic studies, such as the Junta Vacínica (administering the smallpox vaccine), the Royal Bahiense Society of Men of Letters, the Academic Institute of Sciences and Fine Arts, the Fluminense Academy of Sciences and Arts, the Escola Anatômica, Cirúrgica e Médica do Rio de Janeiro, the Royal Academy of Artillery, Fortification and Design, the Academia dos Guardas-Marinhas, the Academia Militar, the National Library of Brazil, the Royal Museum (now National Museum of Brazil), the Teatro Real de São João (now Teatro João Caetano), as well as recruiting internationally famous soloists and patronizing other musicians of the Royal Chapel, including Father José Maurício, the leading Brazilian composer of his time, supporting also the coming of the Missão Artística Francesa, which resulted in the establishment of the Escola Real de Ciências, Artes e Ofícios, predecessor of the present-day Escola Nacional de Belas Artes of the Federal University of Rio de Janeiro, of fundamental importance the renewal of teaching and art production in Brazil.

John's policies led to far-reaching economic changes, beginning with the opening of the ports and the abolition of the Portuguese commercial monopolies, with the United Kingdom being the great beneficiary. On the one hand, traders based in Brazil had to face strong foreign competition; on the other, it encouraged the creation of new manufacturing and other economic activities that were previously banned, poor or nonexistent in Brazil. At the same time, he created such high-level administrative bodies as the War Ministry, the Foreign Ministry, and the Ministry of Marine and Overseas; the Councils of State and of Finance, the Supreme Military Council, the Military Archive, the Bureaus of Justice and of Conscience and Orders, the Casa de Suplicação (Supreme Court), the Intendency General of Police, the first Bank of Brazil the Royal Board of Commerce, Agriculture, Factories and Navigation, and the General Postal Administration, as well as bringing Brazilians into administrative and staff positions, which helped diminish tensions between the natives and the Portuguese. He also encouraged agricultural production, especially cotton, rice and sugar cane, opened roads and encouraged the development of inland waterways, stimulating the movement of people, goods and products between regions.

=== Controversies ===
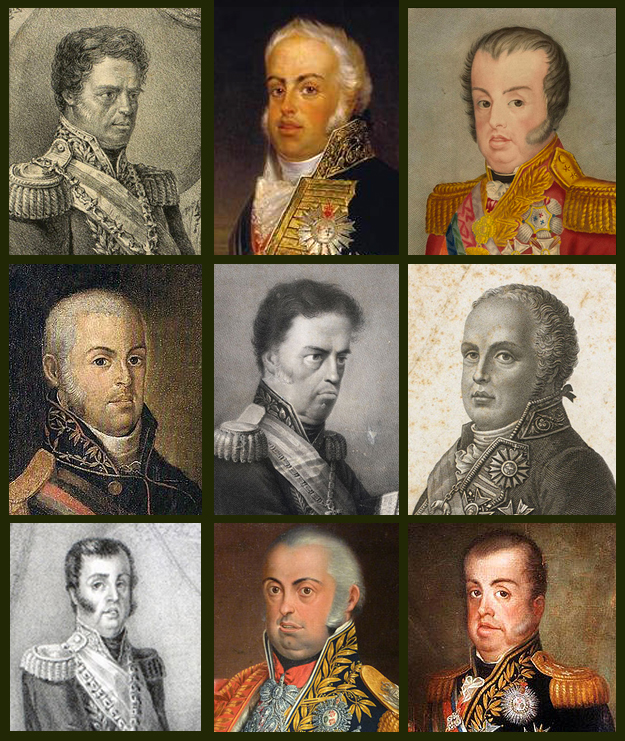
Portraits of John VI by various artists

According to Pedreira and Costa, few Portuguese monarchs have as large a place in the popular imagination as John VI. That image is very varied, "but rarely for good reason. ... It is not strange that the tribulations of his marriage and family life and the references to his personality and personal customs, would invite easy caricature and circulation of an unflattering, if not comic, tradition." the King is popularly shown as indolent, silly and clumsy, subjugated by a shrewish wife, a disgusting glutton who always had baked chicken in his coat pockets to eat them at any time with greasy hands, a version typified by the Brazilian film Carlota Joaquina – Princesa do Brasil (1995), a parody mixed with sharp social criticism. That work had enormous repercussions, but, according to the critical commentary of Ronaldo Vainfas, "it is a story full of errors of all types, misrepresentations, imprecisions, inventions"; for historian Luiz Carlos Villalta, "it constitutes a broad attack on historical knowledge", in contrast to director Carla Camurati's stated intent "to produce a cinematic narrative that would constitute a type of historical novel with pedagogic function and, at the same time, would offer the viewer knowledge of the past and would help, as a people, to think about the present. It does not offer new historical knowledge to the viewer, even if one were to treat history as a novel: it reinforces, in truth, the ideas that the viewers bring, being zero in terms of increased knowledge... In this way, it leads the viewer more to debauchery than to critical reflection on the history of Brazil".

Diverse visual representations of John range from an overweight, oversized, sloppy appearance to a dignified and elegant character. As for historians' portrayals, researcher Ismênia de Lima Martins writes, "If there is agreement among all authors who relied on the testimony of those who knew him closely for his kindness and affability, all the rest is controversy. While some pointed to his countenance of a statesman, others considered him a coward and completely unprepared to govern. In any event, Dom João VI left his indelible mark on Portuguese-Brazilian history, a fact that resonates to the present, through a historiography that insists on judging the King, despite the transformations that discipline experienced over the course of the twentieth century".

In governing, John always depended on strong auxiliaries. Prominent among these were Rodrigo de Sousa Coutinho, 1st Count of Linhares; António de Araújo e Azevedo, 1st Count of Barca; and Tomás Antônio de Vila Nova Portugal. They may be considered the mentors of many of John's most important undertakings, but according to John Luccock: "The prince regent has been various times accused of apathy; to me, he seemed to have greater sensitivity and strength of character than was generally attributed to him by both friends and opponents. He was placed in new circumstances by which he was tested, bowing before them with patience; if incited, he acted with vigor and promptness". He also praised King John's character, reaffirming his kindness and attention. Oliveira Lima, with his classic Dom João VI no Brasil (1908), was one of the major figures responsible for the beginning of John's large-scale rehabilitation. He researched innumerable documents of the era without finding unfavorable descriptions of the King by Brazilians or by ambassadors and other diplomats accredited to the court. On the contrary, he found many accounts that painted him in favorable colors, such as the testimonies left by the British consul Henderson and the U.S. minister Sumter, who "greatly preferred to address himself directly to the monarch, always willing to do justice, than to confer with his ministers.... deeming him in this matter much more advanced than his courtiers". Diplomatic documents also confirm the breadth of his political vision, aiming to give Brazil an importance in the Americas comparable to the United States, adopting a discourse similar to the U.S. doctrine of Manifest Destiny. He asserted his authority without violence, more in a persuasive and affable manner; his conduct of international affairs, although sometimes unsuccessful and somewhat given to imperialist ambitions, in many other ways was far-seeing and harmonious, as indicated by the many actions described above that improved the living conditions of the Brazilian colony.

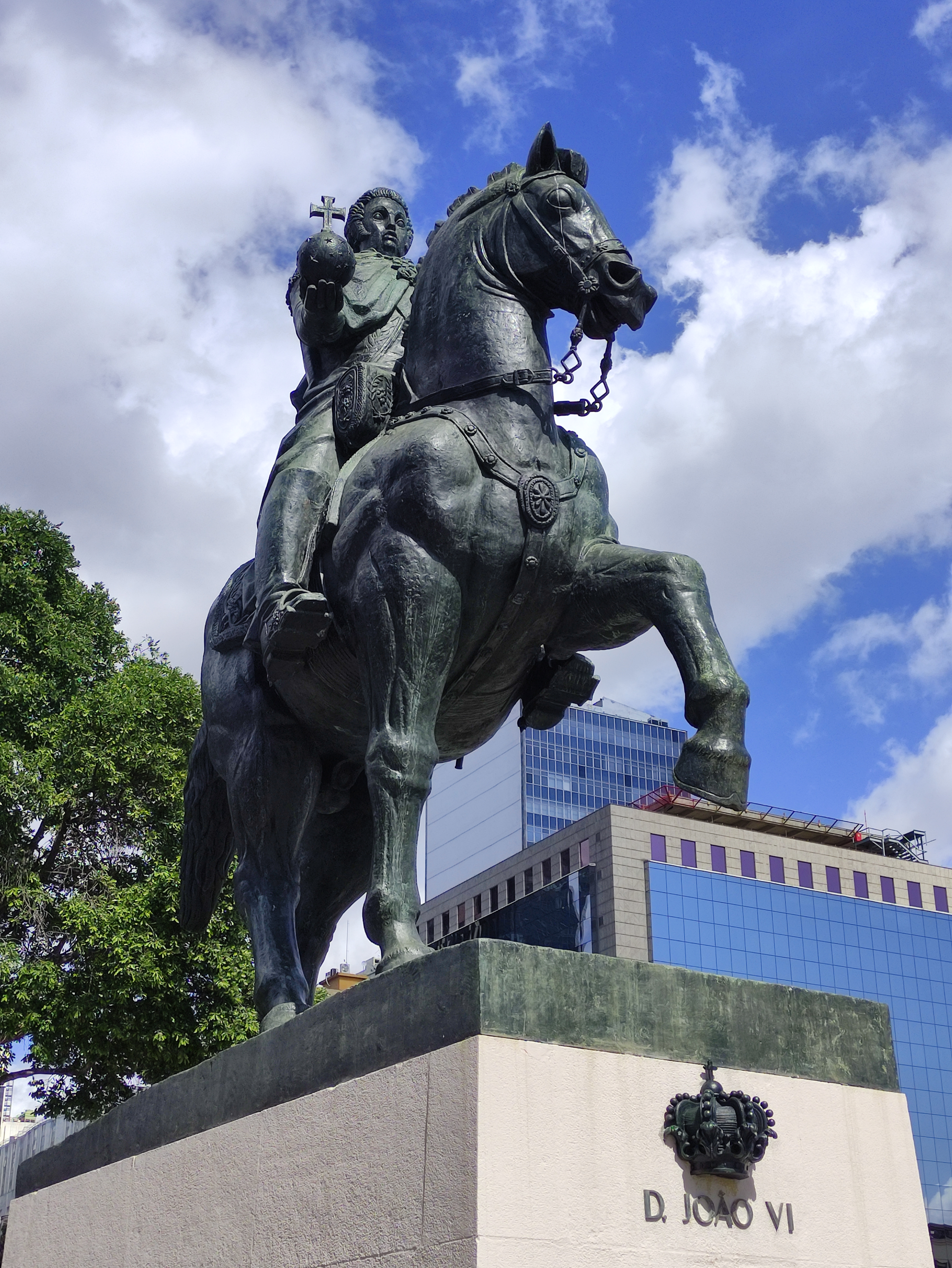
Equestrian statue of King John VI in Rio de Janeiro's XV de Novembro Square

Nonetheless, the French general Jean-Andoche Junot described John as "a weak man, suspicious of everyone and everything, jealous of his authority but incapable of making it respected. He is dominated by the fathers [that is, priests] and can act only under the duress of fear", and several Brazilian historians such as Pandiá Calógeras, Tobias Monteiro and Luiz Norton draw him in comparably dark colors. Among the Portuguese, such as Oliveira Martins and Raul Brandão, he was invariably portrayed as a burlesque figure until the conservative resurgence of 1926, when he began to find defenders, such as Fortunato de Almeida, Alfredo Pimenta and Valentim Alexandre. It is also certain that many were disaffected with him, that he raised taxes and aggravated the debt, multiplied titles and hereditary privilege, that he could not allay the vast array of internal dissensions or eliminate entrenched administrative corruption, and that he left Brazil on the brink of bankruptcy when he emptied the treasury to return to Portugal.

Whatever the King's character may have been, the importance of his reign for a remarkable spurt of development for Brazil and, indeed, for the very unity of that nation is incontestable. Gilberto Freyre affirms that "Dom John VI was one of the personalities who had the greatest influence over the formation of the nation.... he was an ideal mediator.... between tradition – which he incarnated – and innovation – which he welcomed and promoted – during that decisive period for the Brazilian future". As Laurentino Gomes puts it, "no other period of Brazilian history testifies to such profound decisive and rapid changes as the thirteen years in which the Portuguese court lived in Rio de Janeiro". Scholars such as Oliveira Lima, Maria Odila da Silva Dias, Roderick Barman and the aforementioned Laurentino believe that had John not come to the Americas and installed a strong central government, the large territory of Brazil, with important regional differences, would probably have fragmented into several distinct nations, as occurred with the vast neighboring Spanish colony. This opinion was shared by the British admiral Sir Sidney Smith, who served as commander of the squadron that escorted the Portuguese royal court as they fled to Brazil.

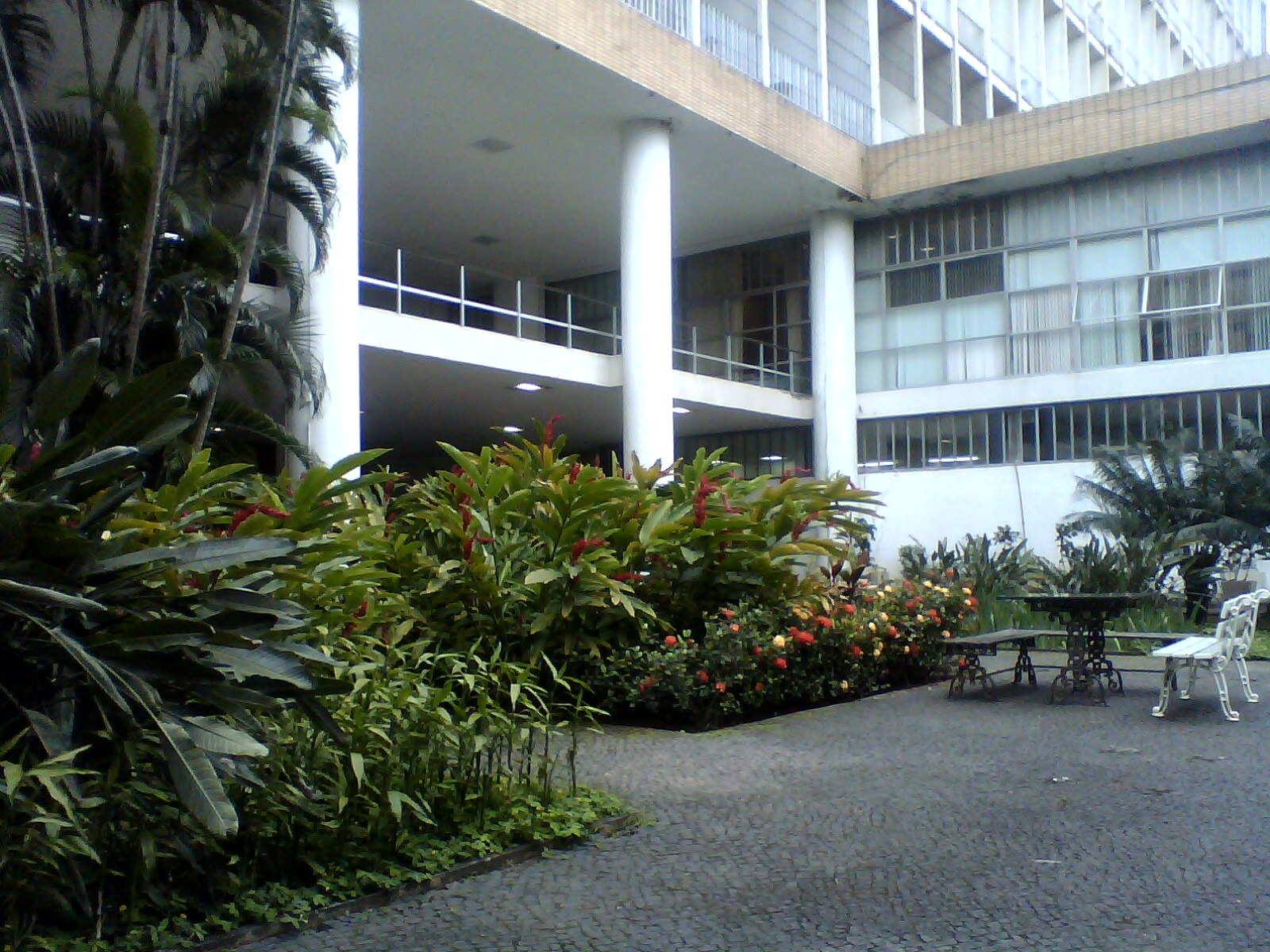
King John VI Museum, a museum of art and history in Brazil.

Recent biographies try to separate fact from legend and counter the folklore of ridicule that had formed around King John and which lacks documentary basis. Lúcia Bastos warns that even today we need to be careful to place certain matters in their historical context, such as the question of corruption, noting that although there were enormous costs and clear abuses, at that time there was no clear separation between the public treasury and the monarch's private accounts, and in the logic of the Old Regime "the King is the owner of the state... of which the distribution of spoils forms part: the King is the dispenser of justice and spoils". Before dying on Saint Helena, John's most powerful enemy, Napoleon, said of him: "He was the only one who deceived me." José Joaquim Carneiro de Campos, the Marquis of Caravelas, praised John in the Brazilian Senate on the occasion of the King's death, saying, "All of us who are here have many reasons to praise the memory of King John VI, we all ought to be grateful, for the benefits he gave us: he raised Brazil to a kingdom, provided well for all of us, treated us always with great affection, and all Brazilians are obligated to him."

== Marriage and descendants ==
John married Carlota Joaquina of Spain (25 April 1775 – 7 December 1830) on 9 June 1785 and had nine children:

Name	Birth	Death	Notes
Infanta Maria Teresa	29 April 1793	17 January 1874	Married first her cousin Infante Pedro Carlos of Spain and Portugal and second to her maternal uncle Infante Carlos, Count of Molina, widower of her sister Maria Francisca.
Francisco António, Prince of Beira	21 March 1795	11 June 1801	Died at the age of 6, making his younger brother Pedro the heir apparent to the throne of Portugal.
Infanta Maria Isabel	19 May 1797	26 December 1818	Married King Don Ferdinand VII of Spain.
Pedro IV of Portugal & I of Brazil	12 October 1798	24 September 1834	Stayed in Brazil after the Peninsular War in Portugal. Proclaimed the Independence of Brazil in 1822 and became its first monarch as Emperor Dom Pedro I. He was also King of Portugal as Dom Pedro IV in 1826.
Infanta Maria Francisca	22 April 1800	4 September 1834	Married her uncle Infante Carlos, Count of Molina.
Infanta Isabel Maria	4 July 1801	22 April 1876	Served as regent of Portugal from 1826 to 1828; died unmarried.
Miguel I of Portugal	26 October 1802	14 November 1866	Known by the Liberals as the Usurper, he was King of Portugal between 1828 and 1834. He was forced to abdicate after the Liberal Wars.
Infanta Maria da Assunção	25 June 1805	7 January 1834	Died unmarried
Infanta Ana de Jesus Maria	23 October 1806	22 June 1857	Married Nuno José Severo de Mendoça Rolim de Moura Barreto, Marquis of Loulé and Count of Vale de Reis, later Prime Minister of Portugal. The Marquis and Marquise of Loulé had issue. After Infanta Ana's death, her grandnephew King Dom Luís I of Portugal elevated the Marquis as first Duke of Loulé.

== Titles, styles, and honours ==
Royal styles of John VI of Portugal
- Reference style: His Most Faithful Majesty
- Spoken style: Your Most Faithful Majesty

=== Titles and styles ===
- 13 May 1767 – 11 September 1788: His Highness Infante John of Portugal
- 11 September 1788 – 20 March 1816: His Royal Highness The Prince of Brazil, Duke of Braganza
- 20 March 1816 – 7 September 1822: His Most Faithful Majesty the King of the United Kingdom of Portugal, Brazil and the Algarves
- 7 September 1822 – 15 November 1825: His Most Faithful Majesty the King of Portugal and the Algarves
- 15 November 1825 – 10 March 1826: His Most Faithful Majesty the King of Portugal and the Algarves, Emperor of Brazil

The official styling from his accession was:
By the Grace of God, John VI, King of the United Kingdom of Portugal, Brazil, and the Algarves, of either side of the sea in Africa, Lord of Guinea and of Conquest, Navigation and Commerce of Ethiopia, Arabia, Persia and India, etc.

When Portugal recognized the independence of Brazil, references to the former united kingdom were finally removed from the royal title; under the Treaty of Rio de Janeiro, King John VI became titular Emperor of Brazil and, from 15 November 1825 onwards he adopted the style:
By the Grace of God, John VI, Emperor of Brazil, King of Portugal and the Algarves, of either side of the sea in Africa, Lord of Guinea and of Conquest, Navigation and Commerce of Ethiopia, Arabia, Persia and India, etc.

=== Honours ===
National orders and decorations

- Grand Master of the Three Military Orders of Christ, Aviz and St. James, 5 July 1809
- Grand Master of the Order of the Tower and Sword, 5 July 1809
- Founder and Grand Master of the Order of the Immaculate Conception of Vila Viçosa, 6 February 1818
- Grand Prior of the Order of St. John of Jerusalem in Portugal, 13 January 1825

Foreign orders and decorations

- Spain:
  - Knight of the Golden Fleece, with Collar, 3 May 1785
  - Grand Cross of the Order of Charles III, 1 January 1796
  - Grand Cross of Isabella the Catholic, 22 February 1816
  - Grand Cross of the Military Order of St. Ferdinand, 26 May 1824
- Netherlands: Grand Cross of the Netherlands Lion, October 1825
- Denmark: Knight of the Elephant, 27 July 1824
- Russian Empire:
  - Knight of St. Andrew, 16 February 1824
  - Knight of St. Alexander Nevsky, 16 February 1824
  - Knight of St. Anna, 1st Class, 16 February 1824
- Austrian Empire:
  - Grand Cross of St. Stephen, 6 November 1817
  - Grand Cross of the Imperial Order of Leopold, 6 November 1817
  - Knight of the Iron Crown, 1st Class, 6 November 1817
- Kingdom of Prussia: Knight of the Black Eagle, 30 August 1825
- United Kingdom: Stranger Knight of the Garter, 19 September 1822
- France:
  - French Empire: Grand Eagle of the Legion of Honour, September 1803
  - Kingdom of France:
    - Grand Cross of the Legion of Honour, 3 March 1817
    - Knight of the Holy Spirit, with Collar, 23 September 1823
    - Knight of St. Michael, 23 September 1823
    - Grand Cross of the Military Order of St. Louis

== Ancestry ==
Ancestors of John VI of Portugal

8. Peter II of Portugal
4. John V of Portugal
9. Maria Sophia of Neuburg
2. Peter III of Portugal
10. Leopold I, Holy Roman Emperor
5. Maria Anna of Austria
11. Eleonore Magdalene of Neuburg
1. John VI of Portugal
12. John V of Portugal (= 4)
6. Joseph I of Portugal
13. Maria Anna of Austria (= 5)
3. Maria I of Portugal
14. Philip V of Spain
7. Mariana Victoria of Spain
15. Elisabeth Farnese

=== Patrilineal descent ===
Patrilineal descent

John VI's patriline is the line from which he is descended father to son.

Patrilineal descent is the principle behind membership in royal houses, as it can be traced back through the generations, which means that John VI is, ultimately, a member of the Robertian dynasty.

House of Braganza

1. Robert II of Hesbaye, 770–807
2. Robert III of Worms, 808–834
3. Robert the Strong, 820–866
4. Robert I of France, 866–923
5. Hugh the Great, 898–956
6. Hugh Capet, 941–996
7. Robert II of France, 972–1031
8. Robert I, Duke of Burgundy, 1011–1076
9. Henry of Burgundy, 1035 – c. 1074
10. Henry, Count of Portugal, 1066–1112
11. Afonso I of Portugal, 1109–1185
12. Sancho I of Portugal, 1154–1211
13. Afonso II of Portugal, 1185–1223
14. Afonso III of Portugal, 1210–1279
15. Denis I of Portugal, 1261–1325
16. Afonso IV of Portugal, 1291–1357
17. Peter I of Portugal, 1320–1367
18. John I of Portugal, 1357–1433
19. Afonso I, Duke of Braganza, 1377–1461
20. Fernando I, Duke of Braganza, 1403–1478
21. Fernando II, Duke of Braganza, 1430–1483
22. Jaime, Duke of Braganza, 1479–1532
23. Teodósio I, Duke of Braganza, 1510–1563
24. João I, Duke of Braganza, 1543–1583
25. Teodósio II, Duke of Braganza, 1558–1630
26. John IV of Portugal, 1604–1656
27. Peter II of Portugal, 1648–1706
28. John V of Portugal, 1689–1750
29. Peter III of Portugal, 1717–1786
30. John VI of Portugal, 1767–1826

== Bibliography ==
- Loyola, Leandro (30 January 2008), "A nova história de Dom João VI", Revista Época (in Portuguese) (506).
- Martins, Ismênia de Lima, "Dom João – Príncipe Regente e Rei – um soberano e muitas controvérsias", Revista Navigator (in Portuguese) (11): 39.
- Gomes, Laurentino (2007). 1808 — How a mad queen, a coward prince and a corrupt court fooled Napoleon and changed the History of Portugal and Brazil (in Portuguese). Planeta.
- Chisholm, Hugh, ed. (1911). "John VI." . Encyclopædia Britannica. Vol. 15 (11th ed.). Cambridge University Press. p. 444.

John VI of Portugal House of Braganza Cadet branch of the House of Aviz Born: 13 May 1767 Died: 10 March 1826
Regnal titles
Preceded by Maria I	King of Portugal; 1816–1826	Succeeded by Peter IV
Portuguese royalty
Preceded by Joseph	Prince of Brazil, later Prince Royal of Portugal; Duke of Braganza; 1788–1816	Succeeded by Pedro
