= Infanta Ana de Jesus Maria of Braganza =

Marquise of Loulé, Countess of Vale de Reis

Infanta Ana de Jesus Maria
- Marquise of Loulé; Countess of Vale de Reis
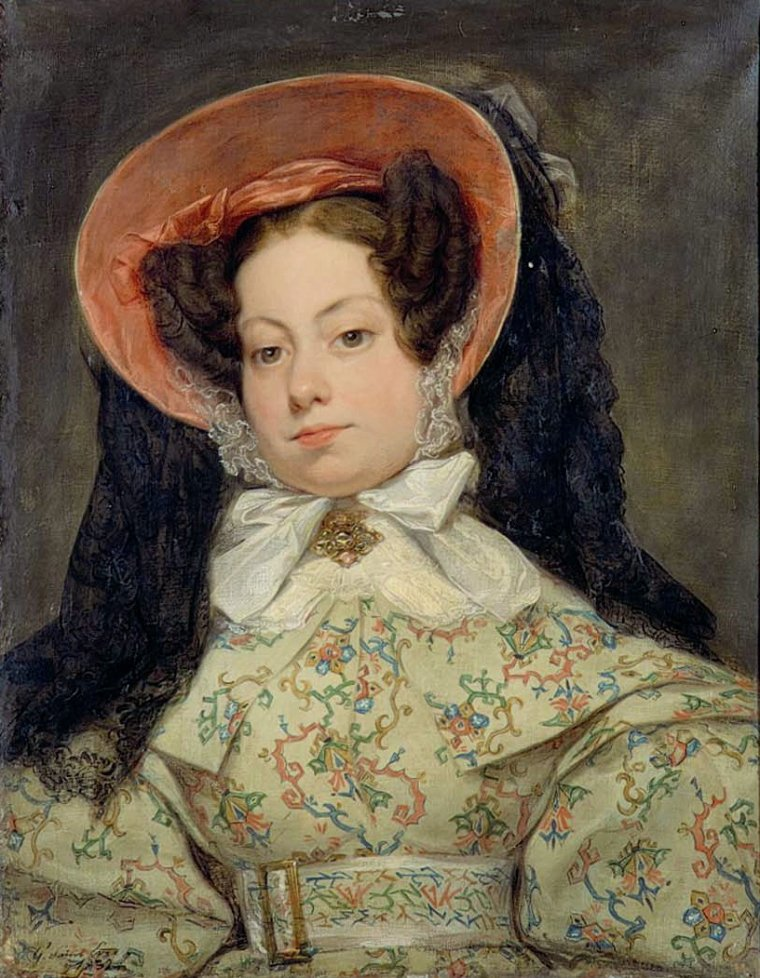
- Ana in 1832
- Born: 23 October 1806; Mafra
- Died: 22 June 1857 (aged 50); Rome
- Spouse: Nuno José Severo de Mendonça Rolim de Moura Barreto, 2nd Marquis of Loulé (m. 1827)
- Issue: Ana Carlota de Sousa Coutinho, Countess of Linhares; Maria do Carmo de Figueiredo Cabral da Câmara, Countess of Belmonte; Pedro de Mendonça Rolim de Moura Barreto, 2nd Duke of Loulé; Maria Amália de Mendonça Rolim de Moura Barreto; Augusto Pedro de Mendonça Rolim de Moura Barreto, 3rd Count of Azambuja
Names
- Ana de Jesus Maria Luís Gonzaga Joaquina Micaela Rafaela Francisca Xavier de Paula
- House: Braganza
- Father: John VI of Portugal and Brazil
- Mother: Carlota Joaquina of Spain

Infanta Ana de Jesus Maria of Braganza (Mafra, 23 October 1806 – Rome, 22 June 1857) was a Portuguese infanta and youngest daughter of King John VI and Carlota Joaquina of Spain.

== Life ==
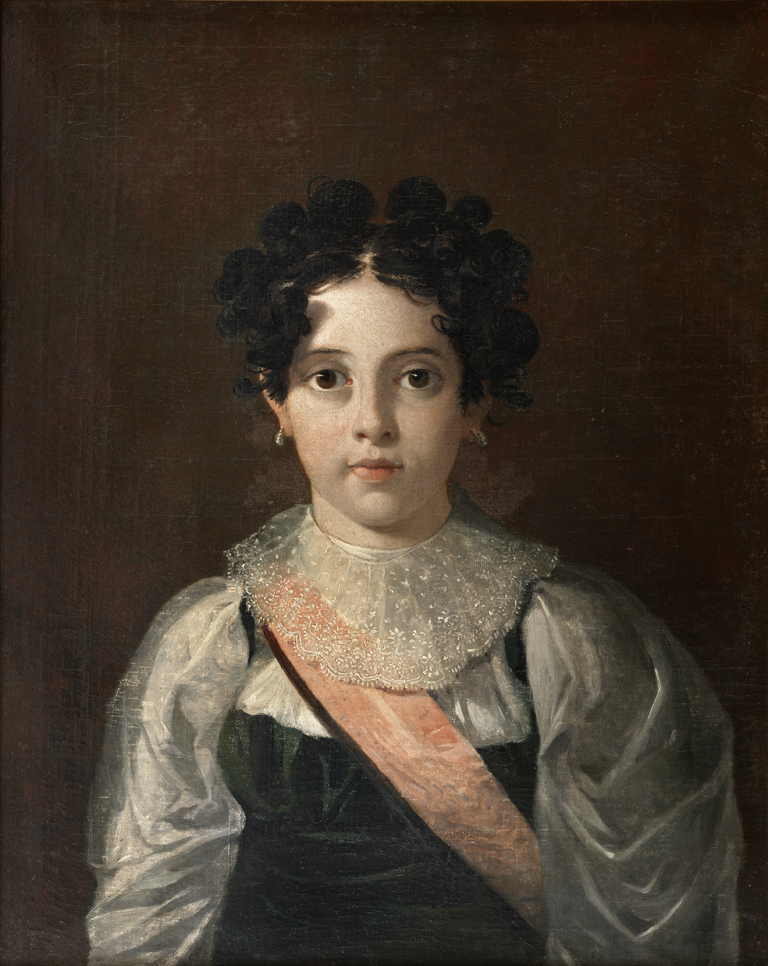
Portrait of the young infanta by Nicolas-Antoine Taunay, 1816

On 5 December 1827, she married Dom Nuno José Severo de Mendonça Rolim de Moura Barreto, then Marquis of Loulé and Count of Vale de Reis, future Duke of Loulé. Subsequently, he served several times as Prime Minister of Portugal. The wedding was celebrated in a private ceremony in the chapel of the Royal Ajuda Palace and was a scandal at the time. Although Loulé was a nobleman and remote descendant of Portugal's royal dynasty, Dona Ana de Jesus was the first infanta of Portugal since the Middle Ages to marry a man who was not of royal rank.

The reasons for the marriage were probably not political, considering the couple's first child was born on 27 December 1827, twenty-two days after the ceremony. The marriage proposal had been refused by D. Ana's father, King John VI, prior to his death in March 1826 (strictly, Portuguese law at the time only stated that the marriage of the heir presumptive required the sovereign's consent, a position D. Ana never held). Nor were either of her brothers present in the country at the time of the wedding (both claimed the kingship from abroad).

The designated regent of the kingdom was D. Ana's elder sister, Infanta Isabel Maria of Braganza, who was present in Lisbon. The marriage was not an elopement, as the royal family was aware of the couple's intention to marry and D. Ana's mother facilitated rather than sought to prevent the marriage before her daughter gave birth.

With the restoration of absolutism in Portugal in 1831, the couple went into exile and began extended travel through Europe. They had several other children abroad. The marriage ended with a de facto separation in 1835. The infanta died before her husband was created a duke (in 1862).

D. Ana's heir, and the head of the Loulé ducal line is her great-great-great-grandson D. Pedro Folque de Mendoça Rolim de Moura Barreto, 6th Duke of Loulé. He is considered by some to be the rightful pretender to the defunct Portuguese throne by virtue of his ancestors' uninterrupted Portuguese citizenship and uninterrupted domicile on Portuguese soil.

== Issue ==
The couple had five children:

- D. Ana Carlota de Mendóça Rolim de Moura Barreto (1827–1893), later Countess of Linhares
- D. Maria do Carmo de Mendóça Rolim de Moura Barreto (1829–1907), later Countess of Belmonte
- D. Pedro José de Mendóça Rolim de Moura Barreto (1830–1909), later 2nd Duke of Loulé
- D. Maria Amália de Mendóça Rolim de Moura Barreto (1832–1880), later became a nun
- D. Augusto Pedro de Mendóça Rolim de Moura Barreto (1835–1914), later 3rd Count of Azambuja

Nuno da Câmara Pereira, a member of the People's Monarchist Party (PPM) in the Assembly of the Republic, descends illegitimately from D. Ana. He promotes restoration of the monarchy under the House of Loulé.

== See also ==
- Descendants of John VI of Portugal
