= Nuno José Severo de Mendoça Rolim de Moura Barreto, 1st Duke of Loulé =

Portuguese politician

His Excellency The Duke of Loulé GCC GCTS FC
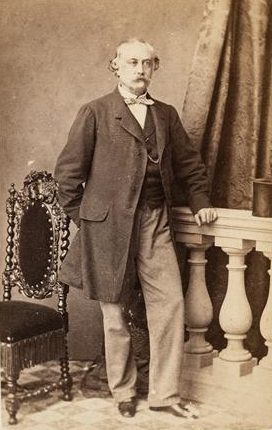
- Photograph of the Duke of Loulé, c. 1860

President of the Council of Ministers
- In office 11 August 1869 – 19 May 1870
- Monarch: Luís I
- Preceded by: The Marquis of Sá da Bandeira
- Succeeded by: The Duke of Saldanha
- In office 4 July 1860 – 17 April 1865
- Monarchs: Pedro V Luís I
- Preceded by: Joaquim António de Aguiar
- Succeeded by: The Marquis Sá da Bandeira
- In office 6 June 1856 – 16 March 1859
- Monarch: Pedro V
- Preceded by: The Duke of Saldanha
- Succeeded by: The Duke of Terceira

Personal details
- Born: Nuno José Severo de Mendoça Rolim de Moura Barreto; 6 November 1804 Lisbon, Portugal
- Died: 22 May 1875 (aged 70) Lisbon, Portugal
- Spouse: Infanta Ana de Jesus Maria of Portugal (m. 1827; died 1857)
- Children: Ana Carlota de Sousa Coutinho, Countess of Linhares; Maria do Carmo de Figueiredo Cabral da Câmara, Countess of Belmonte; Pedro de Mendonça Rolim de Moura Barreto, 2nd Duke of Loulé; Maria Amália de Mendonça Rolim de Moura Barreto; Augusto Pedro de Mendonça Rolim de Moura Barreto, 3rd Count of Azambuja

Dom. Nuno José Severo de Mendoça Rolim de Moura Barreto, 2nd Marquis of Loulé, 9th Count of Vale de Reis, (6 November 1804 – 22 May 1875), was a Portuguese politician during the period of Constitutional Monarchy. He became the 1st Duke of Loulé in 1862.

== Family ==
He was a son of the 1st Marquess of Loule, Agostinho Domingos José de Mendoça Rolim de Moura Barreto. In 1827, he married Infanta Ana de Jesus Maria, younger daughter of King John VI of Portugal. With this marriage, Nuno José Severo become brother-in-law of King Miguel I of Portugal and Emperor Pedro I of Brazil, and paternal uncle of Queen Maria II of Portugal and Emperor Pedro II of Brazil. They had five children:

- Ana Carlota de Mendoça Rolim de Moura Barreto (1827–1893), married to the 3rd Count of Linhares – with issue;
- Maria do Carmo de Mendoça Rolim de Moura Barreto (1829–1907), married to the 3rd Count of Belmonte – with issue;
- Pedro José Agostinho de Mendoça Rolim de Moura Barreto, 2nd Duke of Loulé, (1830–1909). Successor to the dukedom;
- Maria Amália de Mendoça Rolim de Moura Barreto (1832–1880), married Dom João Salazar de Mascarenhas, but the marriage ended and she became a nun – with issue;
- Augusto Pedro de Mendoça Rolim de Moura Barreto, 3rd Count of Azambuja (1835–1914) – with issue.

== Career ==
Leader of the Historic Party, he was many times minister and, for three times, President of the Council of Ministers – Prime Minister (1856–1859, 1860–1865 and 1869–1870).

== Honours ==
- 1862: Created 1st Duke of Loulé.
- 1857: Grand Cordon in the Order of Leopold.
- Member of the Military Order of Christ
- Member of the Order of the Tower and Sword.

Political offices
Preceded by 1st Duke of Saldanha	Prime Minister of Portugal (President of the Council of Ministers); 1856–1859	Succeeded by Duke of Terceira
Preceded by Joaquim António de Aguiar	Prime Minister of Portugal (President of the Council of Ministers); 1860–1865	Succeeded by Marquis of Sá da Bandeira
Preceded by Marquis of Sá da Bandeira	Prime Minister of Portugal (President of the Council of Ministers); 1869–1870	Succeeded by 1st Duke of Saldanha
Portuguese nobility
Preceded by Agostinho Domingos José de Mendoça Rolim de Moura Barreto	Marquis of Loulé; 1824—1875	Succeeded by Pedro José Agostinho de Mendoça Rolim de Moura Barreto
Preceded by New Title	Duke of Loulé; 1862—1875	Succeeded by Pedro José Agostinho de Mendoça Rolim de Moura Barreto, 2nd Duke of Loulé
