= Isabella of Navarre =

Isabella of Navarre may refer to:

- Isabella of Navarre, Countess of Armagnac (1395–1450), daughter of Charles III of Navarre
- Isabella of Navarre, Viscountess of Rohan (1512 – after 1560), daughter of John III of Navarre

== See also ==
- Isabel de Navarre (born 1956), German figure skating coach
