= Isabella of Aragon =

Isabella of Aragon may refer to:

- Isabella of Aragon, Queen of France, daughter of James I of Aragon and Yolande of Hungary. She was queen consort to Philip III of France and was mother of Philip IV of France.
- Isabella of Aragon, Queen of Germany (1305–1330), daughter of James II of Aragon and Blanche of Anjou. She was queen consort to Frederick the Fair
- Isabella of Aragon, Countess of Urgell (1380–1424), daughter of Peter IV of Aragon and Sibila of Fortia. She was wife of James II of Urgell
- Isabella of Urgell, Duchess of Coimbra, daughter of James II, Count of Urgell and the previous Isabella of Aragon. Married Pedro of Coimbra
- Elizabeth of Aragon, aka Isabella, daughter of Peter III of Aragon and Constantia of Sicily; queen consort to Denis of Portugal
- Isabella of Aragon, Duchess of Milan, daughter of Alfonso II of Naples and Ippolita Maria Sforza. She was wife of Gian Galeazzo Sforza
- Isabella I of Castile, daughter of John II of Castile and Isabel of Portugal. Queen consort of Ferdinand II of Aragon, also known as Isabella I of Aragon
- Isabella of Aragon, Queen of Portugal, daughter of Ferdinand II of Aragon and Isabella I of Castile; queen consort to Manuel I of Portugal
- Infanta Isabella Clara Eugenia of Spain, daughter of Philip II of Spain and Elisabeth of Valois; married Archduke Albert of Austria
- Isabella II of Spain, daughter of Ferdinand VII of Spain and Maria Christina of the Two Sicilies; Queen of Spain
- Isabella, Princess of Asturias (1851–1931), daughter of Isabella II of Spain and Francis of Spain; wife of Prince Gaetan, Count of Girgenti
