= Infanta Isabel Maria of Braganza =

Portuguese princess (1801–1876)

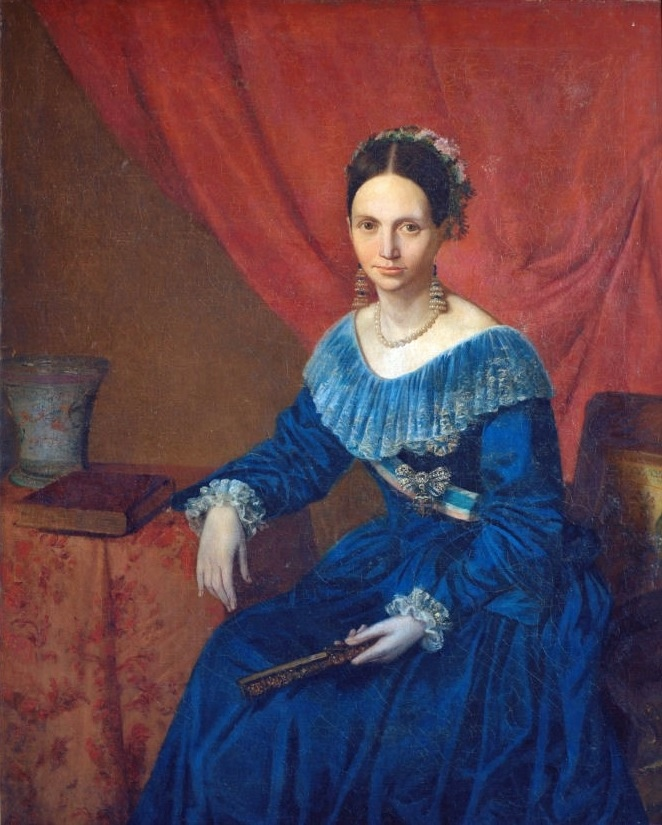
- 1857 portrait

Infanta-Regent of Portugal
- Regency: 6 March 1826 – 26 February 1828
- Monarchs: John VI; Peter IV; Maria II
- Successor: Infante Miguel
- Born: 4 July 1801; Palace of Queluz, Queluz, Portugal
- Died: 22 April 1876 (aged 74); Benfica, Lisbon, Portugal
- Burial: Pantheon of the House of Braganza
Names
- Portuguese: Isabel Maria da Conceição Joana Gualberta Ana Francisca de Assis Xavier de Paula de Alcântara Antónia Rafaela Micaela Gabriela Joaquina Gonzaga
- House: Braganza
- Father: John VI of Portugal
- Mother: Carlota Joaquina of Spain

Infanta Isabel Maria of Braganza (Portuguese pronunciation: [izɐˈbɛl mɐˈɾiɐ]; Queluz, 4 July 1801 – Benfica, then Belém, 22 April 1876) was a Portuguese infanta (princess) and fourth daughter of King John VI of Portugal and Carlota Joaquina of Spain. She acted as Regent of the Kingdom for her brother Pedro IV and for her niece Maria II from 1826 to 1828.

== Early life ==
Her full name was Isabel Maria da Conceição Joana Gualberta Ana Francisca de Assis Xavier de Paula de Alcântara Antónia Rafaela Micaela Gabriela Joaquina Gonzaga de Bragança e Bourbon. She was a titular of the Great-Cross of the Order of Our Lady of Conception; Dame of the orders of Saint Isabel and of the Noble Dames of Mary Louise and awarded with the Starry Cross of Austria.

== Regency ==
Because Prince Pedro, who was heir to the throne, was already Emperor in Brazil, his brother Prince Miguel was exiled in Vienna, their mother Queen Carlota Joaquina was exiled in Queluz and Isabel's older sisters (Maria Teresa and Maria Francisca of Assisi) had married to Spanish infantes (princes), Isabel Maria was chosen to be Regent of the Kingdom until Pedro I of Brazil returned to claim the Portuguese throne as Pedro IV of Portugal. Pedro IV, however, immediately abdicated in favour of his daughter Maria da Glória (who became Maria II of Portugal), with the condition that she should marry her uncle Miguel. Pedro and Maria remained in Brazil and Isabel Maria continued as regent until 1828, when a civil war started between absolutists, supporting Miguel, and liberals, supporting Maria II (called the Liberal War) that would end with a liberal victory and defeat and consequent exile of Miguel.

== Later life ==
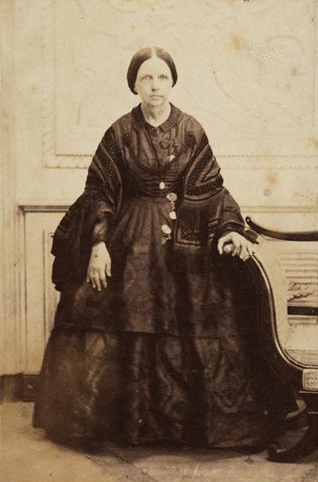
Isabel Maria in 1869

Isabel Maria retired from politics and turned her life to religion. She died unmarried in Benfica (at the time not a neighbourhood of Lisbon but a near town in Belém municipality) on 22 April 1876. She was the last surviving child of John VI of Portugal and the last grandchild of Maria I of Portugal. She is buried in the Royal Pantheon of the House of Braganza.

== Ancestry ==
Ancestors of Infanta Isabel Maria of Braganza

8. João V of Portugal
4. Pedro III of Portugal
9. Maria Anna of Austria
2. João VI of Portugal and Brazil
10. Joseph I of Portugal
5. Maria I of Portugal and Brazil
11. Mariana Victoria of Spain
1. Infanta Isabel Maria
12. Charles III of Spain
6. Charles IV of Spain
13. Maria Amalia of Saxony
3. Carlota Joaquina of Spain
14. Philip, Duke of Parma
7. Maria Luisa of Parma
15. Louise Élisabeth of France

Infanta Isabel Maria of Braganza House of Braganza Cadet branch of the House of Aviz Born: 4 July 1801 Died: 22 April 1876
Political offices
Vacant Title last held by João, Prince of Brazil	Regent of Portugal; 6 March 1826 – 26 February 1828	Succeeded by Miguel
