= Paula de Odivelas =

Portuguese nun and royal mistress

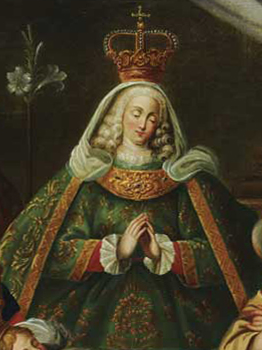
Detail from the painting Mother of God (18th-century Portuguese School), in which Mother Paula of Odivelas was depicted as the Virgin Mary.

Mother Paula of Odivelas (Paula Teresa da Silva e Almeida; 17 June 1701 – 4 July 1768) was a Portuguese nun and royal mistress.

Abbess of the Monastery of Saint Denis of Odivelas, she became the most famous mistress of King John V of Portugal and bore him a son, one of the Children of Palhavã. The passion that inspired to the king during their long love affair turned her into a controversial figure in contemporary Portugal because of the luxury in which she lived thanks to the Brazilian gold provided by the sovereign.

== Life ==
=== Family and early years ===
Paula Teresa da Silva e Almeida was baptized in the parish of Santa Justa, according to the registry of baptisms of that place. Her paternal grandfather was João Paulo de Bryt, a former German soldier and foreign guard of Emperor Charles V, who established in Lisbon as a goldsmith. From his marriage to Leonor de Almeida (daughter of the Neapolitan sailor Domingos Urselo and his wife Domingas de Andrade e Almeida) was born Adrião de Almeida Paulo, who followed his father's profession. Adrião de Almeida Paulo and his wife, Josefa da Silva and Sousa, had three daughters: Maria Micaela da Luz, Paula Teresa da Silva and Leocádia Felícia de Assis e Almeida.

According to the records of the Monastery of Saint Denis of Odivelas, Maria Micaela da Luz became a novice on 15 August 1704, and professed on 4 October of that year, remaining in this institution until her death in September 1768, two months after Paula's demise. As for Leocádia Felícia, she also stayed in Odivelas for a while before her marriage with José Falcão de Gamboa Fragoso (native from Boavista and Santo Aleixo and owner of the Quinta da Bela Vista and the Quinta do Falcão in Pontinha), with whom she had a daughter.

Paula Teresa followed the example of her older sister and entered in the Monastery of Saint Denis of Odivelas as a novice on 31 January 1717 (according to the records) and professed on 22 February of that year. Her religious life seems to have been decided by her father since her early infancy; the difficult financial situation of Adrião de Almeida Paulo would justify his desire to ensure the support of his daughters through their entrance in that institution in the environs of Lisbon.

=== Affair with King John V ===
The Monastery of Saint Denis of Odivelas was a place assiduously frequented by the nobility at the time when Paula became a nun. On 11 May 1719 the festivity for the Relief of the Blessed Sacrament (Desagravo do Santíssimo Sacramento) was held in the monastery, promoted by the Count of Penaguião and Francisco de Assis de Távora. On 23 October, with the presence of the court, a commemorative bullfight to celebrate the wedding of Brás Baltasar da Silveira and Joana de Meneses, a daughter of the Counts of Santiago, took place in Odivelas. Therefore, there would be no lack of opportunities for King John V and his courtiers to be near the monastery.

It was around this time that began the meetings between the sovereign and Paula, because she gave birth to a son, called José of Braganza on 8 September 1720 in Lisbon. There are several versions of the story about the way in which the king and Paula met, such as Charles Fréderic de Merveilleux (for whom the monarch took interest in another woman who resisted to his advances and took refuge in Odivelas, where he would meet Paula) and Alberto Pimentel (for whom the monarch's first love interest would be Madalena Máxima de Miranda, the mother of Gaspar of Braganza, another of the Children of Palhavã). A more reliable version say that Paula at first was the mistress of Francisco de Portugal, 8th Count of Vimioso, before he was forced to leave her in favor of the sovereign.

Beautiful, young and now with the status of royal mistress, Paula became the abbess of her institution and received all the attention of the king, who extended his generosity to her family. She was quickly known to be extremely arrogant, susceptible, and with a taste to say improper words incompatible with her religious status. After the death of King John V, she returned to the cloister and the perfect observance of her religious duties, but continued to use the chambers which the sovereign had built for her.

=== The luxury of Mother Paula ===
Adrião de Almeida benefited from the connection between his second daughter and the king, who gave him some properties, documented in the Chancellery of the Order of Christ. Thus, 15 September 1722, Paula's father received the habit of the Order (at this time, according to the letter assigned to it during his investiture, he was a widower and older than 50 years) and was knighted, receiving license to professing in the Monastery of Nossa Senhora da Luz. In addition, on 8 October of that year he was also awarded with a pension of 12 reis "from the almojarifazgo (a customs tax) from the fruit of Lisbon".

In 1728, Paula received hefty annuities, registered in the Royal Chancellery. Thus, on 28 April were granted to the Abbess 210,000 reis per year. On 10 May, were assigned additional 210,000 reis per year for Paula and all her heirs and successors, and finally, on 3 November was established a pension of 1288 reis (ceded by Manuel Tomás da Silva, dean of the Chapel Royal of Vila Viçosa), which would last three lives (Paula, Maria da Luz, and Leocádia) and with the option to be prolongated if the third beneficiary had children.

John V yet determined the building of a residence for Paula, "whose interior was worthy of magnificence of the king's gold", known popularly as the "Tower of Mother Paula", the residence was demolished in 1948 because of the danger of collapse, during works in the Monastery. In her residence, were also rooms for Paula's sister Maria da Luz.

An anonymous description of the interior of Paula's residence is kept in the archive of the Biblioteca Nacional de Portugal, who apparently was contemporary with the inhabitants of the house, since it uses the present tense ("the room above, where watch", "the cabinet in which Paula put her cap"). One of the known copies of the document has the title "True news of ornament we saw in the homes of Mother Sister Paula Maria, religious in the monastery of Odivelas. She would be whom King John V dealt with the more distinct honors thanks to a loving affection" (Notícia verdadeira do ornato que se viu nas casas de Madre Soror D. Paula Maria, religiosa no mosteiro de Odivelas. Seria a quem El-Rei D. João V tratou com as mais distintas honras obrigado a um amoroso afecto).

The text refers to the various divisions that make up the living quarters of Paula and Maria da Luz, enumerating the decoration ("seats of yellow velvet, with silver railings", "armed with melamine carmine, with fringes and railings with the color of gold") and furniture that adorns them, the author striving to impress with the profusion of objects such as mirrors (often gilded) or buffets (existing in all spaces described, except in the oratory, who also was luxurious). Some furniture, such as the "fashion bed" of Paula, with "solid gold statues of saints in the reliefs" and also valuable clothing ("very fine sheets of Holland"), deserve particular attention. The author claims to have not contemplated ("it has not yet seen") numerous chests with "thousands of clothes" that are said to exist.

The most impressive aspect of the description is plenty of silver ("all of gilded silver, which has no number", "and everything that can not be repeated, in silver"), of gilt ("the walls of gilt", "golden carved ceilings", "the whole oratory gilded", "two gilded pelmets", etc.) and gold ("embroidered curtains of gold and gold tassels"). The repetition of terms related to this metal (in the eleven paragraphs of the text, the word "gold" is used thirty times, as the set of adjectives derived from it) highlights the concern of the anonymous author to highlight the splendor of the residence. Brazilian gold would abound in Odivelas, with Paula's chambers (served by nine maids) a true symbol of splendor.

César de Saussure contributes to the idea of Paula's luxury with his description of a "solid silver bathtub, gilded inside and outside", that he saw in London (which have been commissioned in 1724 by King John V). Built exclusively for the lover of the Portuguese monarch, "a religious of an unknown convent", the bathtub would weigh 3580 ounces, causing, for his beauty, the admiration of the British court.

The detailed characterization of Paula's residence in the anonymous document has been considered accurate, though Carlota Abrantes Saraiva highlights the absence of references of the sets of valuable tiles whose existence in the residence are noted in the 19th century, and was mentioned by Borges de Figueiredo and Manuel Bernardes Branco. Possibly the manuscript describing the nun's residence, erroneously called "Paula Maria" in the title, can't deserve full confidence, falling into exaggeration. It will have arisen as a result of the interest in the extramarital relationship of King John V, and of the fame that at the time was created about the ostentation that was an essential aspect of the image of the monarch and the nun. Certainly, the royal favorite couldn't fail to benefit herself from this wealth, the content of the text corresponding to the expectations of potential readers.

Created myths in the first half of the 18th century will be at the origin of belief in Paula's oriental luxury. However, King John V have contributed to this legend with the grants which gave to Paula and her family and his investment in the decoration of the Tower, whose main chambers have been destroyed by the earthquake of 1755.

Mother Paula lived sumptuously, even after the death of King John V. She died at the age of 67, being buried in the House of the Chapter of the Monastery of Saint Denis of Odivelas.

== Aftermath ==
=== Fiction ===
In the novel Baltasar and Blimunda of the Nobel Prize-winning Portuguese author José Saramago, Mother Paula is described by the king as a "cloistered flower with the fragrance of incense, glorious flesh" (Editorial Caminho, p. 158).

She is the subject of the series Madre Paula (TV series).

== Bibliography ==
- LOURENÇO, Maria Paula Marçal; PEREIRA, Ana Cristina; TRONI, Joana. Amantes dos Reis de Portugal. 380p. ISBN 978-989-626-136-8
- PIMENTEL, Alberto. As Amantes de D. João V. Bonecos Rebeldes, 2009. ISBN 9789898137296
