= Madre Paula (TV series) =

- Genre: Romantic drama; Period drama
- Based on: Madre Paula by Patrícia Müller
- Directed by: Tiago Alvarez Marques; Rita Nunes
- Starring: Joana Ribeiro; Paulo Pires
- Country of origin: Portugal
- Original language: Portuguese
- No. of seasons: 1
- No. of episodes: 13

Production
- Production company: Vende-se Filmes

Original release
- Network: RTP1
- Release: 5 July – 27 September 2017

Madre Paula is a Portuguese drama television series adapting the novel of the same name by Patrícia Müller which stars Joana Ribeiro and Paulo Pires. It originally aired on RTP1 in 2017.

== Premise ==
Set in the 18th century, the fiction tracks the 13-year long passionate love story between John V, the Magnanimous and Paula de Odivelas, a nun.

== Cast ==
- Paulo Pires as D. João V.
- Joana Ribeiro as Madre Paula.
- Sandra Faleiro as Rainha Maria Ana.
- Miguel Nunes as Infante Francisco.

== Production and release ==
Produced by Vende-se Filmes, the series consists of an adaptation of the novel Madre Paula by Patrícia Müller. The episodes were directed by Tiago Alvarez Marques and Rita Nunes. Aired on RTP1, the broadcasting run of the 13-episode series spanned from 5 July 2017 to 27 September 2017.

Series	Episodes	Originally released		
Series	Episodes	First released	Last released	Network
1	13	5 July 2017	27 September 2017	RTP1

== Awards and nominations ==
Year	Award	Category	Nominee(s)	Result	Ref.
2018	7th Sophia Awards	Best Series		Won	
