= Monastery of São Dinis de Odivelas =

Building in Lisbon District, Portugal

Coordinates: 38°47′29″N 9°10′58″W

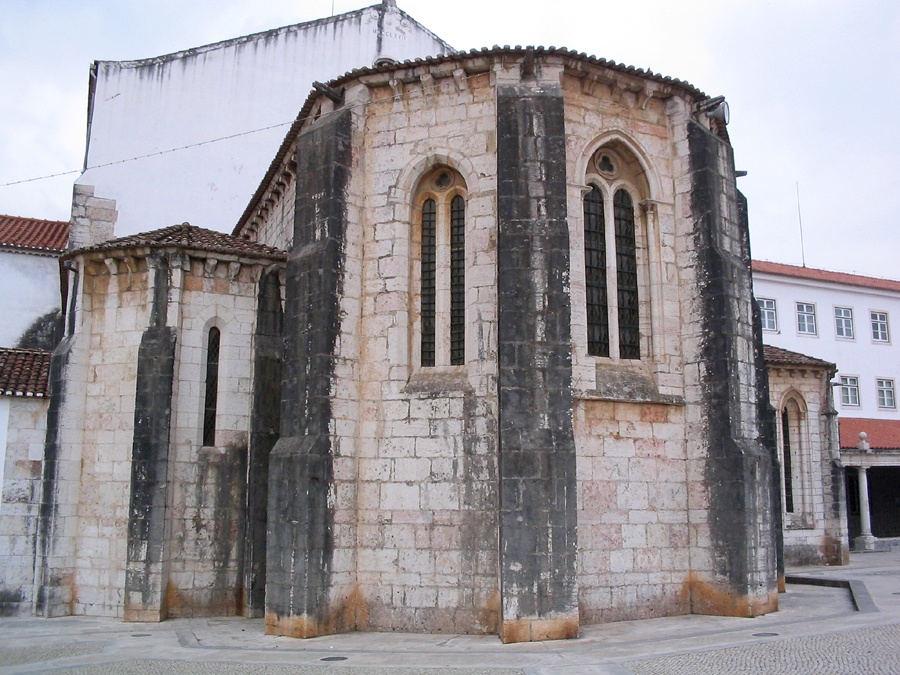
View of the Gothic apse of the Monastery of Odivelas

Location map of the Monastery of São Dinis de Odivelas

The Monastery of Saint Denis (Portuguese: Mosteiro de São Dinis) a former Cistercian nunnery in the city of Odivelas, near Lisbon, in Portugal. The Cistercian was founded by King Dinis I and was built during the 14th century in Gothic style. It is the burial place of the king. From 1900 to 2015, it housed the Instituto de Odivelas, an internal college for girls.

== History ==
According to a legend, King Dinis was hunting near Beja when he was attacked by a bear, which made him fall off his horse. Fearing for his life, Dinis swore to found a monastery if he could escape alive. In the combat that ensued, the King managed to plunge his dagger into the heart of the beast and kill it.

Dinis founded the abbey in 1295 on an isolated spot of the Portuguese hinterland, around which the village of Odivelas developed. The works proceeded swiftly, being mostly finished some ten years after the foundation stone had been laid. King Dinis I died in 1325 and was buried in a Gothic tomb in the abbey church. One of the king's daughters, Maria Afonso (died 1320), is also buried here.

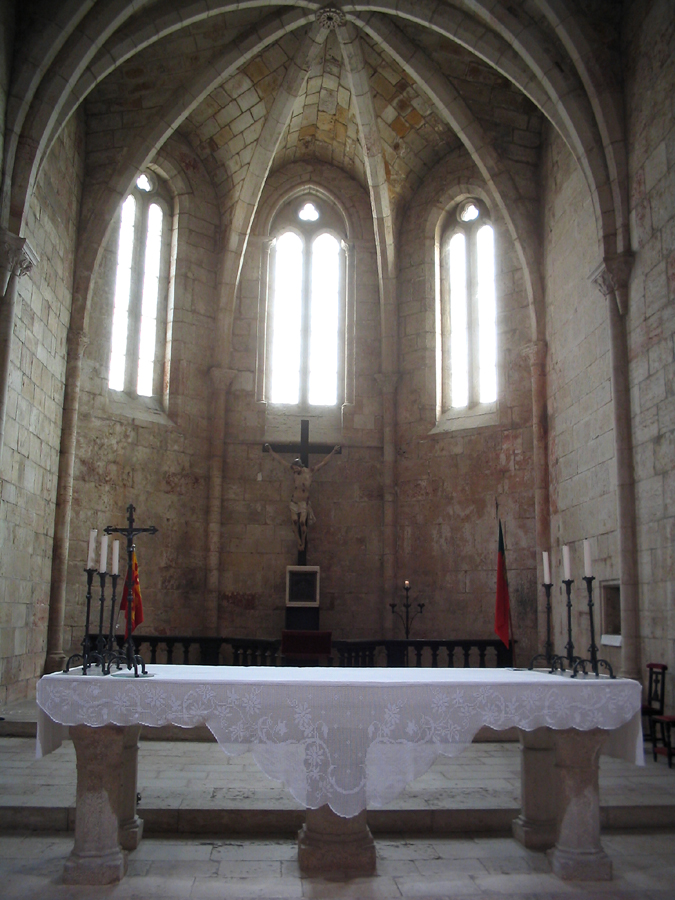
Main chapel of the church of the Monastery of Odivelas

The existence of a royal palace in Odivelas meant that the abbey was favoured by some Portuguese monarchs during the Middle Ages. An important figure associated with the abbey is Queen Philippa of Lancaster, who lived some time there until her death in 1415. She was provisionally buried in the church of the monastery until being translated to the Monastery of Batalha.

In the early 16th century there were several improvements, including the building of a new cloister in Manueline style and a Renaissance gallery by the entrance. In 1669, the abbey was visited by Cosimo III de Médici. In the early 18th century, the abbey was frequently visited by King John V, who had a scandalous affair with Mother Paula (1701–1768), the abbess. They had an illegitimate son, José, one of the so-called Children of Palhavã.

The buildings were greatly damaged by the 1755 Lisbon earthquake, and had to be partially rebuilt. The nave of the church, in particular, was totally remodelled, leaving only the apse and its three chapels in the original 14th-century Gothic style.

With the dissolution of religious orders in the 19th century, the monastery was adapted by the Portuguese military to serve as an educational institution for girls.

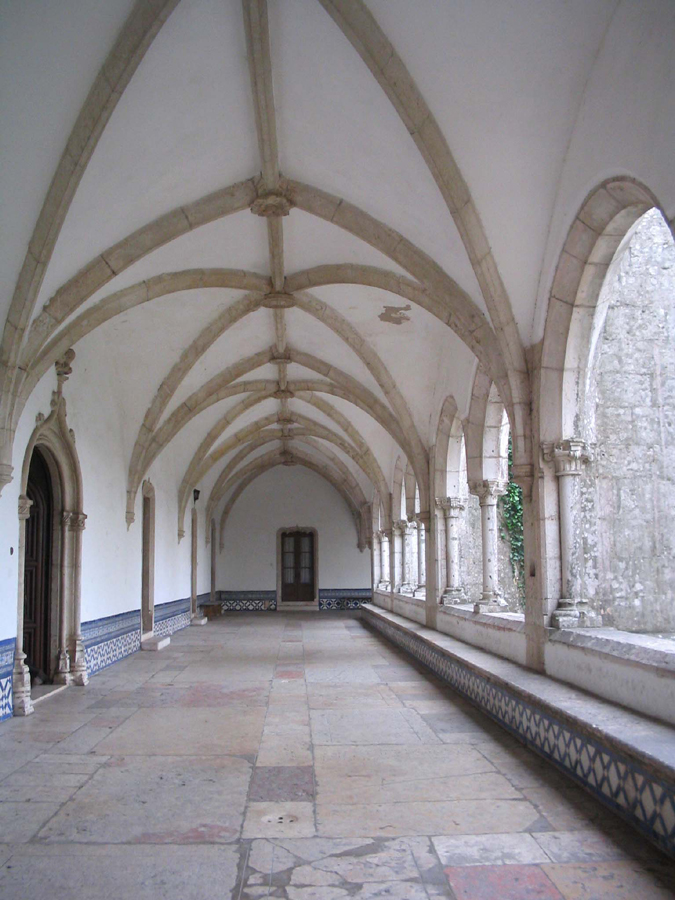
Main cloisters of the Monastery of Odivelas with Gothic rib vault and Manueline portals

== Art & architecture ==
Of the original buildings, only the apse of the church and parts of the cloisters remain. The apse is a typical example of the plain Gothic of the monasteries built by the mendicant orders in mediaeval Portugal: clear forms and little decoration. The apse is composed of a main chapel and two side chapels, all of polygonal shape and reinforced with buttresses. In the interior, all chapels are covered by rib vaulting and are illuminated by three windows. Another Gothic chapel was added to the south side of the apse in 1425. In spite of its late date, this chapel is similar to the earlier ones in architectural terms. The original nave of the church had three aisles, but after the 1755 earthquake the space was unified under a single aisle.

One of the lateral chapels of the apse houses the tomb of King Dinis, decorated with his recumbent effigy. His tomb, as well as that of his daughter Maria Afonso, are remarkable examples of early 14th-century Portuguese sculpture, even though they were damaged by the 1755 earthquake and by Napoleonic troops that invaded Portugal in the 19th century.

The monastery has two cloisters. The main cloister was built in the 14th century, but nowadays only parts of the original vaulting still exist. In the early 16th century the monastery was partially remodelled in Manueline style. The main cloister gained many Manueline portals, and a second cloister, nicknamed the Claustro da Moura, was built. Later in the century a gallery (loggia) in Mannerist style was added to the façade.

An important legacy of the early 18th century is the refectory of the monastery, decorated by painted wooden panels on the ceiling and tile (azulejo) panels on the walls.
