= João da Mota e Silva =

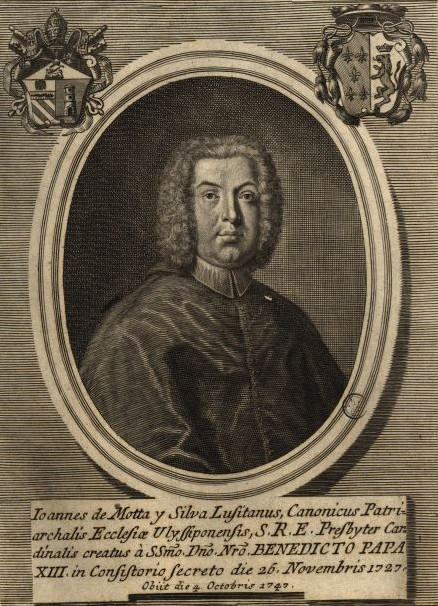
Portrait of João da Mota e Silva (1685–1747), cardinal-Archbishop of Braga and prime-minister of Portugal.

João da Mota e Silva (known as Cardinal da Mota) (Castelo Branco, 14 August 1685 – Lisbon, 4 October 1747) was a Portuguese Cardinal and politician who held the office of Secretary of State of Portugal, equivalent of that of Prime Minister of Portugal, between 1736 and 1747.

== Biography ==
Dom João da Mota e Silva was born into a family without noble rank on 14 August 1685. He was the youngest of five brothers, all of whom became clergymen, and four sisters, two of whom became nuns. Four of the siblings adopted the surname "Mota e Silva," derived from their maternal grandparents.

João da Mota e Silva began his studies in theology in Évora and later continued them at the University of Coimbra, where he earned his doctorate in theology in 1712.

Initially, he served as a canon at the collegiate church of São Tomé in Lisbon. He was eventually created a cardinal-priest by Pope Benedict XIII during the consistory of 2 November 1727, at the request of King John V of Portugal. Via an apostolic brief dated 18 December, the Pope sent him the cardinal's biretta. Cardinal da Mota never traveled to Rome, not even to receive the biretta and his title. Neither did he participate in the 1730 conclave that elected Pope Clement XII, nor in the 1740 conclave that elected Pope Benedict XIV.

In 1732, the King appointed him Archbishop of Braga, but he never received confirmation from the Holy See. Therefore, the archdiocese officially remained vacant from 1728 to 1740. Following the death of Diogo de Mendonça Corte-Real in 1736, he became the chief advisor to King John V, performing duties equivalent to those of a prime minister, although he was never officially designated as such.

Cardinal da Mota was also the person who launched the Marquis of Pombal into politics and who initiated the silk industry in Portugal. This introduction was based on a study he authored and presented to the King, a document containing statistical analysis that was remarkably advanced for the time.

Cardinal da Mota died on 4 October 1747, in Lisbon. He lay in state and was buried in the Church of Santa Maria do Monte Carmelo in Lisbon, which was almost completely destroyed in the 1755 Lisbon earthquake and never rebuilt. His death was likely caused by rheumatic fever, following a prolonged period of suffering during which he continued to carry out his duties.

Catholic Church titles
Preceded by Rodrigo de Moura Teles	Archbishop of Braga; 1732	Succeeded by José de Bragança
Political offices
Preceded by Diogo de Mendonça Corte-Real	Secretary of State of Portugal (Prime Minister); 1736–1747	Succeeded by Marco António de Azevedo Coutinho
