= Maria Rita of Braganza =

Portuguese nun

Maria Rita Gertrudes of Braganza (22 May 1731 in Lisbon – 1808 in Lisbon) was a Portuguese nun, and the illegitimate daughter of John V of Portugal and Luísa Clara de Portugal. She was a nun at the Convent of Santos.
