= Children of Palhavã =

Three sons of King John V of Portugal

The children of Palhavã (Portuguese Meninos de Palhavã) were three male natural sons of King John V of Portugal (who reigned from 1706 to 1750), which were recognised by the monarch in a document issued in 1742, which was published only after the death of the king, in 1752.

The expression comes from the fact these three children had lived in the palace of the Marquis of Louriçal, in the Palhavã area, in those times outside Lisbon. Today, this building is within the city limits and it is occupied by the Spanish Embassy as the House of the Spanish Ambassador.

The children had a remarkable education in the Santa Cruz Monastery, in Coimbra. Their master was Friar Gaspar da Encarnação, who educated them as religious men according to the late King's wishes.

The three children of Palhavã were:

- Antonio (D. António) (1714–1800) - his mother was Luísa Inês Antónia Machado Monteiro. He became Doctor in Theology and later knight of the Order of Christ.
- Gaspar (D. Gaspar) (1716–1789) - his mother was Madalena Máxima de Miranda, a nun. He became archbishop of Braga.
- José (D. José) (1720–1801) - his mother was Mother Paula, abbess of the Monastery of Saint Denis of Odivelas. He became General Inquisitor of Portugal.

Despite being King José I's half brothers, Antonio and José were exiled to Buçaco in 1760 due to a conflict with the Marquis of Pombal, the all-mighty prime minister. They were allowed to return to the Court only after the king's death, in 1777.

== Sources ==
- Newitt, Malyn (2019). The Braganzas: The Rise and Fall of the Ruling Dynasties of Portugal and Brazil, 1640–1910. Reaktion Books. p. 122. ISBN 9781789141658 – via Google Books.

== See also ==
- John V of Portugal
- Joseph I of Portugal
- Marquis of Pombal
- Archdiocese of Braga
