= Diogo de Mendonça Corte-Real =

Portuguese diplomat and statesman

His Excellency Diogo de Mendonça Corte-Real KC FC
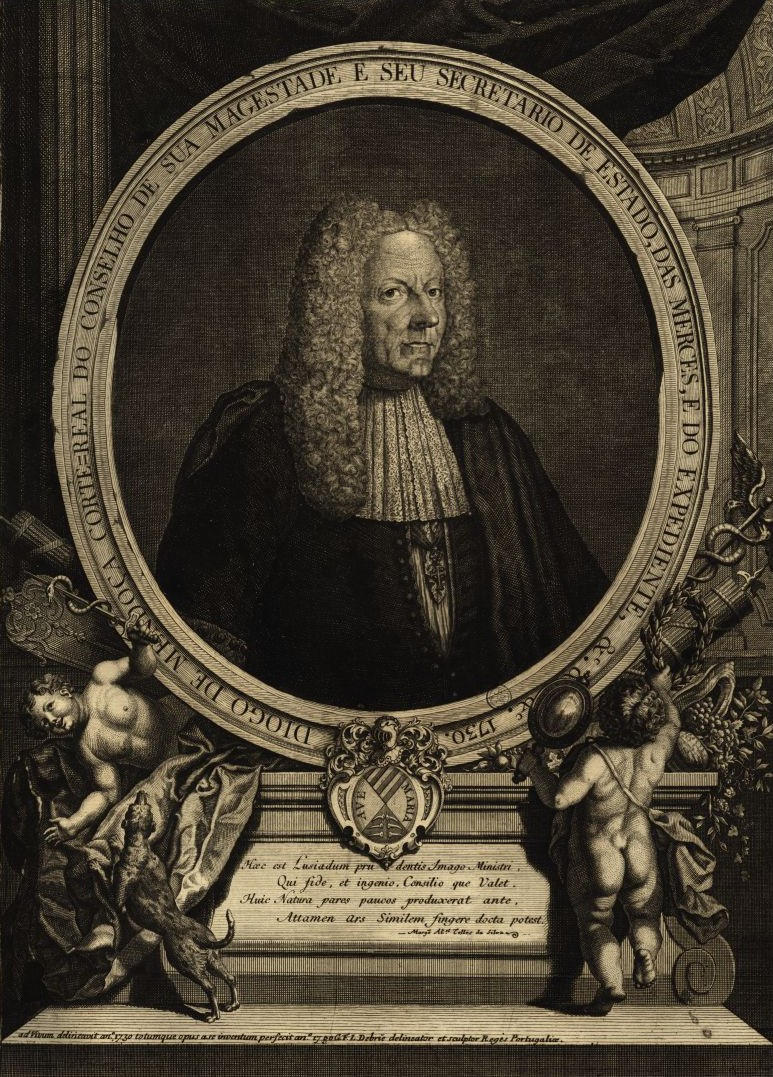

Secretary of State of Portugal
- In office 24 September 1704 – 9 May 1736
- Monarchs: Peter II; John V
- Preceded by: Manuel Pereira
- Succeeded by: João da Mota e Silva

Personal details
- Born: 17 July 1658 Tavira, Algarve, Portugal
- Died: 9 May 1736 (aged 77) Benfica, Lisbon, Portugal
- Education: University of Coimbra
- Profession: Statesman, Diplomat

Diogo de Mendonça Corte-Real (17 June 1658 – 9 May 1736) was an accomplished Portuguese diplomat and statesman, and Secretary of State to King Peter II and John V.

== Biography ==
Diogo de Mendonça Corte-Real was born in 1658, in Tavira, the son of Diogo de Mendonça Corte-Real, of the Corte-Real family, and Jerónima de Lacerda, both of them born into nobility with familial relationships with the most distinguished noble houses of Portugal and Spain.

Corte-Real's high level of intelligence had been manifest since his early schooling. He enrolled at the University of Coimbra, where he gained his doctorate in canons in 1686 and in law in 1687. He then held the office of chief judge of the Porto Comarca and, during the course of his duties, became well-liked for his righteousness and character. The judge's competence did not go unnoticed by the Royal Court and the King, Peter II, sent him a summons in January 1691 to leave magistrature and to become a special diplomat in the Dutch Republic, in order to settle the matter of the constant attacks of the Dutch navy against Portuguese ships.

=== Diplomat ===
On 3 March, that same year, Corte-Real embarked to the Dutch Republic. On 14 April, as they sailed across the coast of England, the ship ran aground on a sandbank. The danger was imminent. Panic took over the passengers and crew, but Corte-Real kept his calm, and helped the officers overseeing the evacuation procedure. Corte-Real, his family, and the captain left the ship aboard a boat, the rest of the crew aboard another boat. The ship foundered, and the two boats spent the night adrift until morning, when their occupants spotted the English coastline. Corte-Real travelled to London, where he departed for The Hague.

Diogo de Mendonça Corte-Real proved to be efficient in dealing with the difficulties that arose between Portugal and the Dutch Republic. After a series of conferences about the matter, on 22 May 1692, the diplomat achieved the goal of his mission when the two nations signed a treaty in which the Dutch Republic paid eighty-thousand patacas as compensation for all the attacks on Portuguese ships.

The success of this mission earned him praise from the Portuguese King. The King, who had wanted send an envoy to the Spanish Court, saw Corte-Real fit to the task, and named him as such in 1693. Corte-Real stayed at the Spanish Court until 1703, year in which he returned to Portugal on account of the death of King Charles II of Spain and the outbreak of the Spanish War of Succession.

On 2 April 1701, King Peter II named him Secretário Real das Mercês e do Expediente having, as duties, passing decrees, orders, letters, and papers that were not of State-level importance and, more specifically, the ordering of mercês (mercies, roughly translated; the repayment for services to the State and Crown). When Portugal joined the Spanish War of Succession, Corte-Real was encharged with the administration of armed operations. Later, he took part in the negotiations leading to the signing of the Treaty of Utrecht, that would put an end to the conflict.

=== Secretary of State ===
King Peter II died on 9 December 1706, and King John V rose to the throne. The new King named Diogo de Mendonça Corte-Real his Secretário de Estado (Secretary of State, a position equivalent to the present-day Prime Minister) on 27 April 1707. Corte-Real was, during the course of his duties, encharged with the marriage contracts between Prince Joseph of Portugal and the infanta of Spain, Mariana Victoria, as well as between the Prince of the Astúrias D. Ferdinand and the infanta Barbara of Portugal.

Mendonça Corte-Real married D. Teresa de Bourbon, widow of Álvaro da Silveira e Albuquerque, colonel of the regiment in Cascais and Governor of Rio de Janeiro, in October 1718. Their first daughter, D. Joaquina de Bourbon, was baptized by D. Tomás de Almeida, the Cardinal Patriarch of Lisbon, and their first son, João Pedro de Mendonça Corte-Real, had King John as his godfather.

The diplomat was active and was in office until his unexpected death on 9 May 1736. He had been strolling through his farm in Benfica, Lisbon, when he felt a piercing pain. He died in a few hours. His body was buried in the Church of Nossa Senhora do Amparo.
