= José of Braganza, High Inquisitor of Portugal =

Portuguese clergyman and High Inquisitor

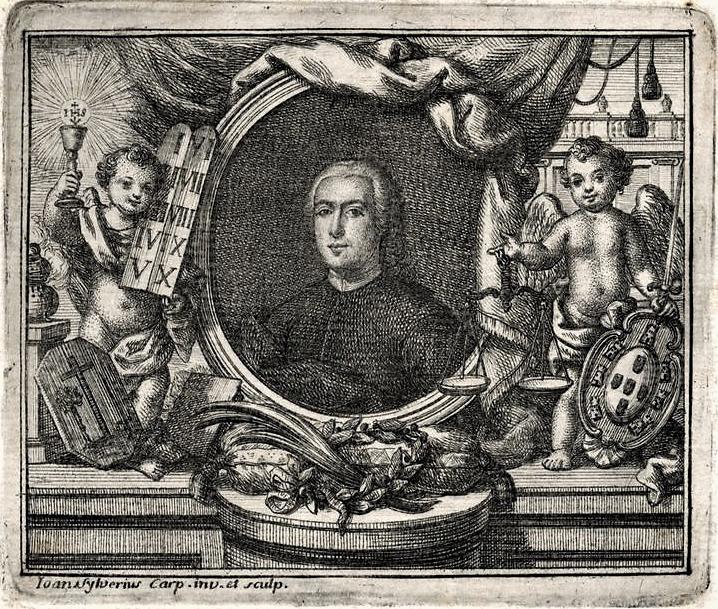
Engraved portrait by João Silvério Carpinetti, 1758

José of Braganza, High Inquisitor of Portugal (Lisbon, 8 September 1720 – Lisbon, 31 July 1801) was a Portuguese clergyman, and the illegitimate son of John V of Portugal and Paula de Odivelas. He was High Inquisitor of the Portuguese Inquisition. He was one of the three Children of Palhavã.
