= Poderosas =

Television series

- "A Vida é Para Vencer" (Portuguese) "Life is to Win" (English)
- Created by: Patrícia Müller
- Starring: Joana Ribeiro; Soraia Chaves; Maria João Luís; Margarida Marinho; Rogério Samora (see more)
- Country of origin: Portugal
- Original language: Portuguese
- No. of episodes: 296

Original release
- Network: SIC
- Release: 18 May 2015 – 20 May 2016

Related
- Rainha das Flores

Poderosas is a Portuguese telenovela that was produced by SP Televisão and aired on SIC from 18 May 2015 to 20 May 2016. It was succeeded by Rainha das Flores (Queen of Flowers). The initial writing was done by Patrícia Müller, but later Pedro Lopes took over as Müller went on maternity leave. This telenovela marked the first soap opera in the second time slot.

The main roles in Poderosas were portrayed by Maria João Luís, Rogério Samora, Soraia Chaves, Joana Ribeiro, and Margarida Marinho.

== Plot ==
This is the story of three women with different motives who unite to seek revenge against a man. Amélia (Soraia Chaves), Jacinta (Maria João Luís), and Luísa (Joana Ribeiro) are known as "As Poderosas" (The Powerful Ones). Their target is José Maria (Rogério Samora). Each woman has her own personal reasons: Amélia witnessed her mother's death and seeks justice, Jacinta was deceived and unfairly imprisoned, and Luísa wants to protect her family and heritage. As they confront the cunning and dangerous side of José Maria, they encounter various obstacles that extend beyond him.

Amélia, the most cerebral and the group's leader, grapples with a haunting past that continues to affect her present. She creates an alter ego and assumes that role every day, enduring the oppressive control of José Maria, a constant reminder of the father who abandoned her. Forced to play the perfect secretary almost constantly, Amélia is torn between her thirst for justice and a newfound sacred duty. She must ultimately decide which force is more potent: revenge or blood ties.

Jacinta, the most mature of the trio, becomes an easy target for the villain. While a part of her desires justice, another side of her still holds affection for José Maria and dreams of a blissful family life in a countryside home. Caught between seeking revenge and embracing José Maria's love, Jacinta faces a difficult choice. She must determine which force holds more sway: revenge or her cherished dream.

Luísa, the youngest and most impulsive, is driven by the promise she made to her father on his deathbed: to protect their family, particularly her mother Marina (Margarida Marinho), who is blind to José Maria's true nature and has fallen under his spell. The weight of that promise burdens Luísa daily, even as she experiences the lightness of love from Dinis (Tomás Alves). Life seems to simultaneously pull her down and lift her up. Luísa is forced to make a decision: save her family and honor her father's memory or embrace a life of happiness with her true love. She must determine which force holds more power: revenge or love.

Though they pursue different goals and experience different emotions, Amélia, Luísa, and Jacinta find strength in their unity. Together, they possess the power to seek justice and dismantle the man who has caused them immense harm. Collectively, they can reshape the world. Will the combined will of these three women surpass destiny itself, or will destiny prevail as the ultimate force?

== Cast ==
Actor/Actress	Character
Joana Ribeiro	Luísa Nogueira
Soraia Chaves	Amélia Henriques
Maria João Luís	Jacinta Lourenço
Margarida Marinho	Marina Nogueira
Rogério Samora	José Maria de Sousa e Ataíde
Tomás Alves	Dinis Lourenço
Pedro Sousa	Rúben José Dias
João Jesus	Gonçalo Nogueira
Jorge Corrula	Miguel de Sousa e Ataíde
Rui Mendes	Homero de Sousa e Ataíde
Ana Nave	Valquíria Dias
Julie Sergeant	Virgínia Matos
Joaquim Nicolau	Alfredo Dias
Mafalda Tavares	Cecília Dias
Rita Loureiro	Olga Mendonça
Sara Barros Leitão	Inês Mendonça
Ângelo Rodrigues	Salomão Silva
Adriano Luz	Julião Rocha
Miguel Bogalho	Julião Rocha Júnior
Dânia Neto	Bruna Filipa Rocha de Mamede
Rui Melo	David Mamede
Andreia Dinis	Mónica Pereira
Miguel Costa	Vítor
Manuel Cavaco	António Sousa
Tiago Aldeia	Manuel Sousa
Inês Costa	Rosa
Filipa Louceiro	Alice/Dália
Lia Carvalho	Violeta Barros
António Camelier	Alexandre
Alexandre da Silva	João Gomes
Cristina Cunha	Fátima
