= Luísa Clara de Portugal =

Portuguese courtier

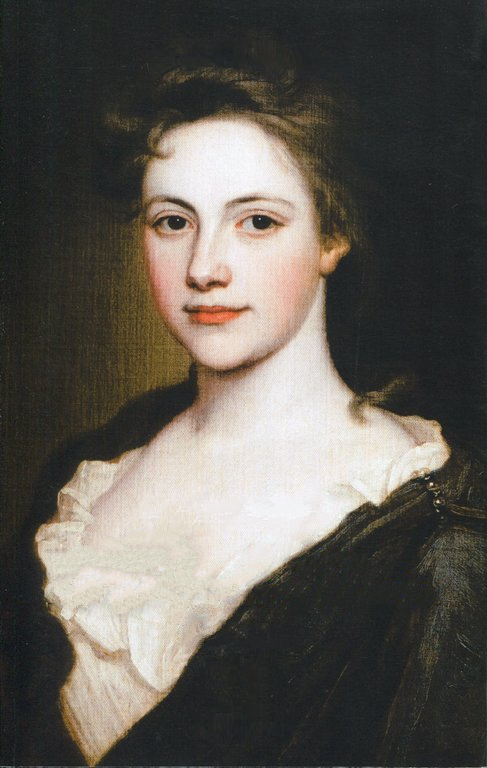
La Flor da Murta, portrait by Pierre-Antoine Quillard, c. 1726-1733

Luísa Clara de Portugal (known as Flor da Murta (Myrtle flower) 1702 – 1779) was a Portuguese courtier. She was the mistress of King John V of Portugal, with whom she also had a child, Maria Rita Gertrudes de Portugal. Two novels have been written about her.

== Profile ==
Portugal was the daughter of Bernardo de Vasconcelos e Sousa, from the family of the Counts of Castelo Melhor. He was the governor of the Fort of Santiago do Outão, in Setúbal. Her mother was D. Maria Madalena de Portugal.

Remarkable for her beauty, Portugal was known as the Flor da Murta (Myrtle Flower). On 6 January 1720 she married Jorge Francisco de Menezes (1690 – 1736), and had three children with him before beginning her affair with the king, with whom she had a daughter, Maria Rita Gertrudes de Portugal (1731 – 1808), who was separated from her mother and became a nun at the Convent of Santos-o-Novo Convent in Lisbon. Returning from travels to Algarve, her husband had found her pregnant. Realising that he could not challenge the king to a duel, he took his children and left Lisbon to live in nearby Sintra, thereby giving his wife the freedom to carry on her relationships. After her affair with the king, she had an affair with his half-brother, leading the king to threaten castration of his relative. She also had a relationship with the first Duke of Lafões, with whom she also had a daughter, D. Ana de Bragança.

Through her husband, she became the owner of the Quinta da Terrugem, in Oeiras, and the residence of the Menezes, Lords of Alconchel in Spain and Ponte de Sor in Portugal, which is in the current Rua de São Bento, in Lisbon. As a result of her occupation of the latter, it became known as "Palace of Flor da Murta".

== Legacy ==
Her connection with King John V inspired two novels by Francisco José da Rocha Martins: Dona Flor da Murta (1928) and Flor da Murta (1939). She may also have been the inspiration for the song Flor da Murta, which was composed in the 18th century.
