= Gaspar of Braganza, Archbishop of Braga =

Portuguese archbishop

Gaspar
- Archbishop-Primate of Braga
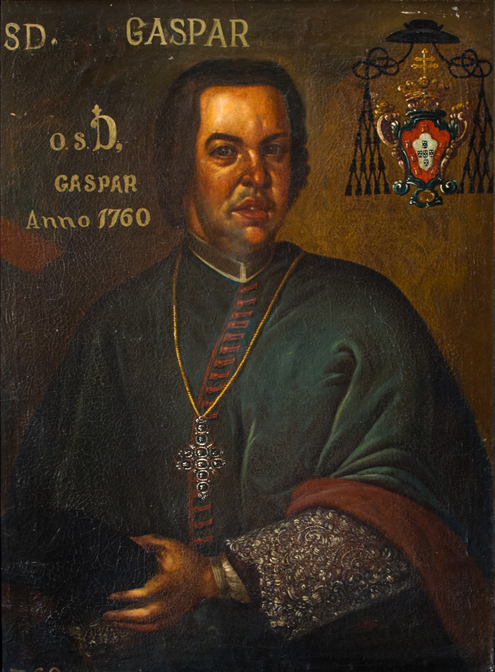
- Born: 8 October 1716; Lisbon, Kingdom of Portugal
- Died: 18 January 1789; Braga
- House: House of Braganza
- Father: John V of Portugal
- Mother: Madalena Máxima de Miranda

Gaspar of Braganza, Archbishop-Primate of Braga (Lisbon, 8 October 1716 – Braga, 18 January 1789) was a Portuguese clergyman, and the illegitimate son of John V of Portugal and Madalena Máxima de Miranda. Known as one of the three Children of Palhavã, he later became Archbishop of Braga.
