= Cabinda Expedition =

- Part of the European colonisation of Africa
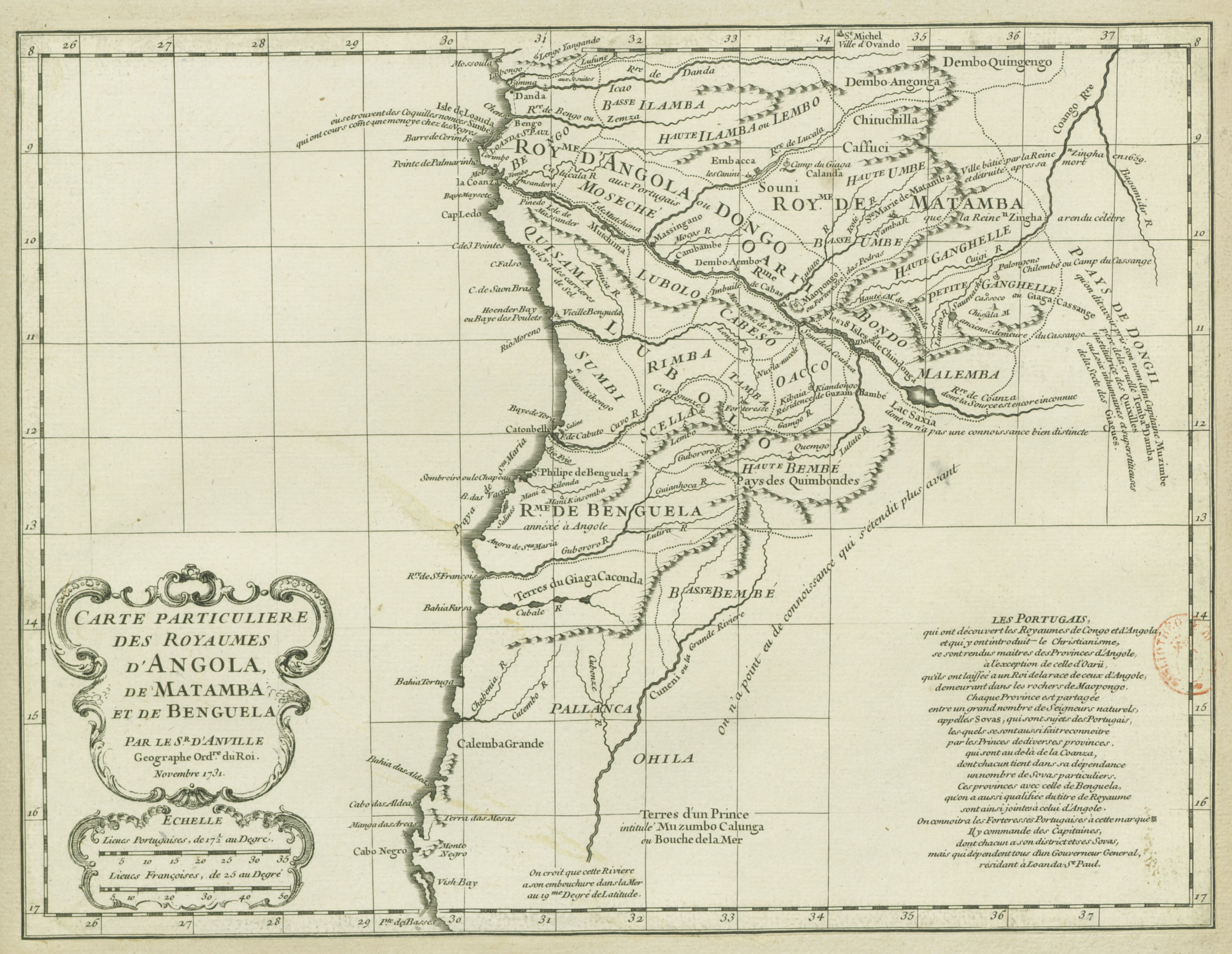
- 1731 French map of Portuguese Angola
Date	23–25 September 1723
Location	Cabinda, Southern Africa 5°33′1″S 12°11′2″E
Result	Portuguese victory

Belligerents
Portugal	Royal African Company

Commanders and leaders
Estêvão José de Almeida	Nurse Hereford (surrendered)

Strength
1 ship of the line	1 fort 2 sloops 1 merchant ship

Casualties and losses
Unknown	1 fort captured 2 sloops captured

The Cabinda Expedition was a Portuguese military expedition launched in 1723 to capture the British Royal African Company (RAC) slave fort in Cabinda. Although Portugal and Great Britain were longstanding allies, the Portuguese viewed the RAC’s presence as an infringement on their territorial claims and ordered an attack on the fort. A Portuguese ship of the line discovered the British fort in September 1723 and demanded it to surrender. When this was refused, the Portuguese began an exchange of fire with the fort on 23 September. The fort's defenders surrendered two days later and were allowed to return to Europe, with the Portuguese assuming control of the fort. Despite the expedition occurring in peacetime, neither the RAC nor the British government lodged diplomatic protests.

== Background ==
In 1722, the British Royal African Company (RAC) established a slave fort in Cabinda, Southern Africa. Despite Great Britain and Portugal being in a longstanding alliance, the Portuguese government made plans to expel the RAC from Angola, viewing the fort's existence as being an infringement on Portugal's territorial claims in the region. The Overseas Council began drafting plans to attack the British slave fort using the Portuguese Navy, which were finalised in 1723. The governor-general of Brazil, Vasco Fernandes César de Meneses, was ordered to mobilise military forces for the expedition, which included detaching Portuguese warships stationed in Brazil to participate in it.

On 16 or 17 May 1723, two ships of the line, the 60-gun Nossa Senhora da Madre de Deus and 52-gun Nossa Senhora da Atalaia, departed from the Tagus convoying 16 merchant ships destined for the Captaincy of Bahia. The fleet was under the command of the captains of sea and war José de Semedo Maia and Estêvão José de Almeida. Upon the fleet's arrival in Bahia, Nossa Senhora da Atalaia, under de Almeida's command, was sent to Angola with orders to destroy the RAC slave fort in Cabinda.

== Expedition ==
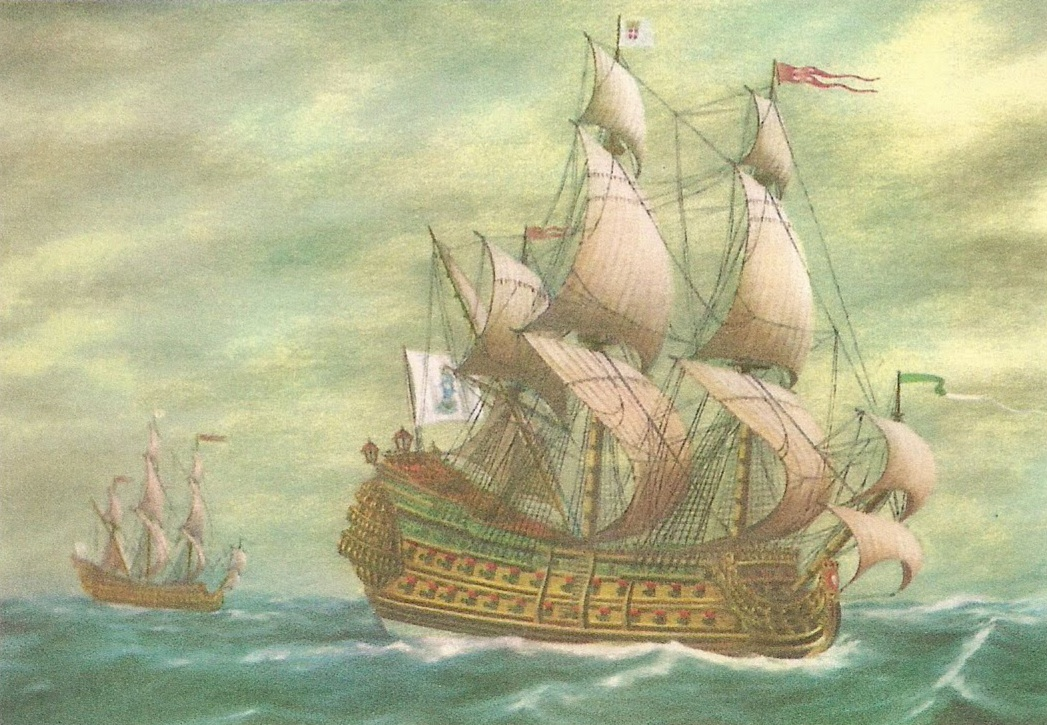
Nossa Senhora da Conceição, a Portuguese ship of the line and contemporary of Nossa Senhora da Atalaia

Nossa Senhora da Atalaia arrived in Luanda on 12 September, and set sail on 6 October to scout the British presence in Cabinda. Following two weeks of sailing, the ship's crew discovered the RAC presence, and observed that the British had recently built a fort in Cabinda armed with 30 cannons. The Portuguese also discovered next to the fort two RAC sloops with under 18 guns each and a merchantman. On 23 September, de Almeida, citing the Portuguese claims in the region, ordered the British fort's governor, Nurse Hereford, to surrender.

When Hereford refused, the Portuguese opened fire at the British, targeting the two sloops. The crews of both sloops were forced to abandon ship and fled to the fort's protection. Over the next two days, Nossa Senhora da Atalaia and the British fort engaged in an intense exchange of gunfire. The fort's defenders eventually surrendered on 25 September, and in the surrender negotiations Hereford successfully requested the Portuguese return the two sloops so the RAC employees could return to Europe.

== Aftermath ==
Following the British departure, the Portuguese took control of the RAC fort, opting to continue to maintain it. The expedition resulting in Portugal reaffirming its position in Southern Africa and the South Atlantic trade routes. Despite Great Britain and Portugal being at peace, and the two nations being allies, neither the RAC nor British government issued diplomatic protests over the expedition.
