= John V of Portugal =

King of Portugal from 1706 to 1750

John V
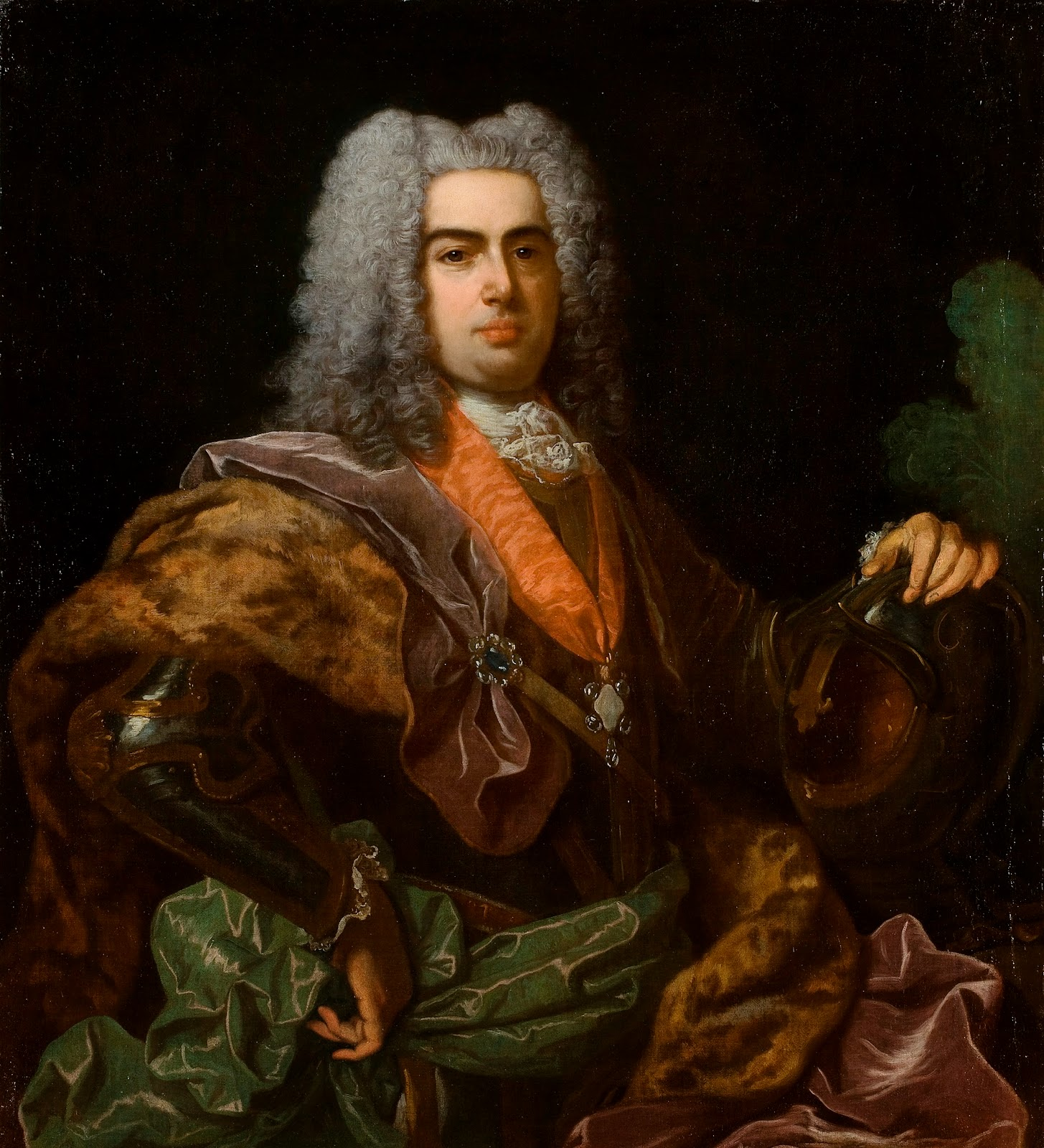
- Portrait, c. 1729

King of Portugal
- Reign: 9 December 1706 – 31 July 1750
- Acclamation: 1 January 1707, Lisbon
- Predecessor: Peter II
- Successor: Joseph I
- Born: 22 October 1689; Ribeira Palace, Lisbon, Kingdom of Portugal
- Died: 31 July 1750 (aged 60); Ribeira Palace, Lisbon
- Burial: Pantheon of the Braganzas
- Spouse: Maria Anna of Austria (m. 1708)
- Issue among others...: Barbara, Queen of Spain; Pedro, Prince of Brazil; Joseph I, King of Portugal; Infante Carlos; Pedro III; Infante Alexandre; Illegitimate: António of Braganza; Gaspar, Archbishop of Braga; José, High Inquisitor of Portugal; Maria Rita of Braganza
Names
- Portuguese: João Francisco António José Bento Bernardo
- House: Braganza
- Father: Peter II of Portugal
- Mother: Maria Sophia of Neuburg
- Religion: Roman Catholicism

Dom John V (22 October 1689 – 31 July 1750), known as the Magnanimous and the Portuguese Sun King, (Note: This epithet drew parallels with Louis XIV of France, who was likewise known as the Sun King.) was King of Portugal from 9 December 1706 until his death in 1750. His reign saw the rise of Portugal and the Portuguese Empire to new levels of prosperity, wealth, and prestige among European courts.

John V's reign saw an increased influx of gold into the royal treasury, supplied largely by the royal fifth (a tax on precious metals) that was received from the colonies of Brazil and Maranhão. John spent lavishly on ambitious architectural works, most notably Mafra Palace, and on acquisitions for his sizeable art and literary collections. In order to boost Portugal's diplomatic standing, he expended large sums on embassies to the courts of Europe, most famous being those sent to Paris in 1715 and Rome in 1716.

Disregarding traditional Portuguese institutions of governance, John V ruled as an absolute monarch. As with previous monarchs from the House of Braganza, his reign was marked by numerous interventions into the affairs of other European states, most notably during the War of the Spanish Succession. On the imperial front, John V pursued an expansionist policy, with significant territorial gains in Portuguese India and Portuguese America.

A deeply religious man, John returned support from Pope Benedict XIV with a fervent devotion to the Catholic Church and significant donations. He received the title "Most Faithful Majesty" in return, although his relationship with the papacy varied depending on its holders.

== Upbringing ==
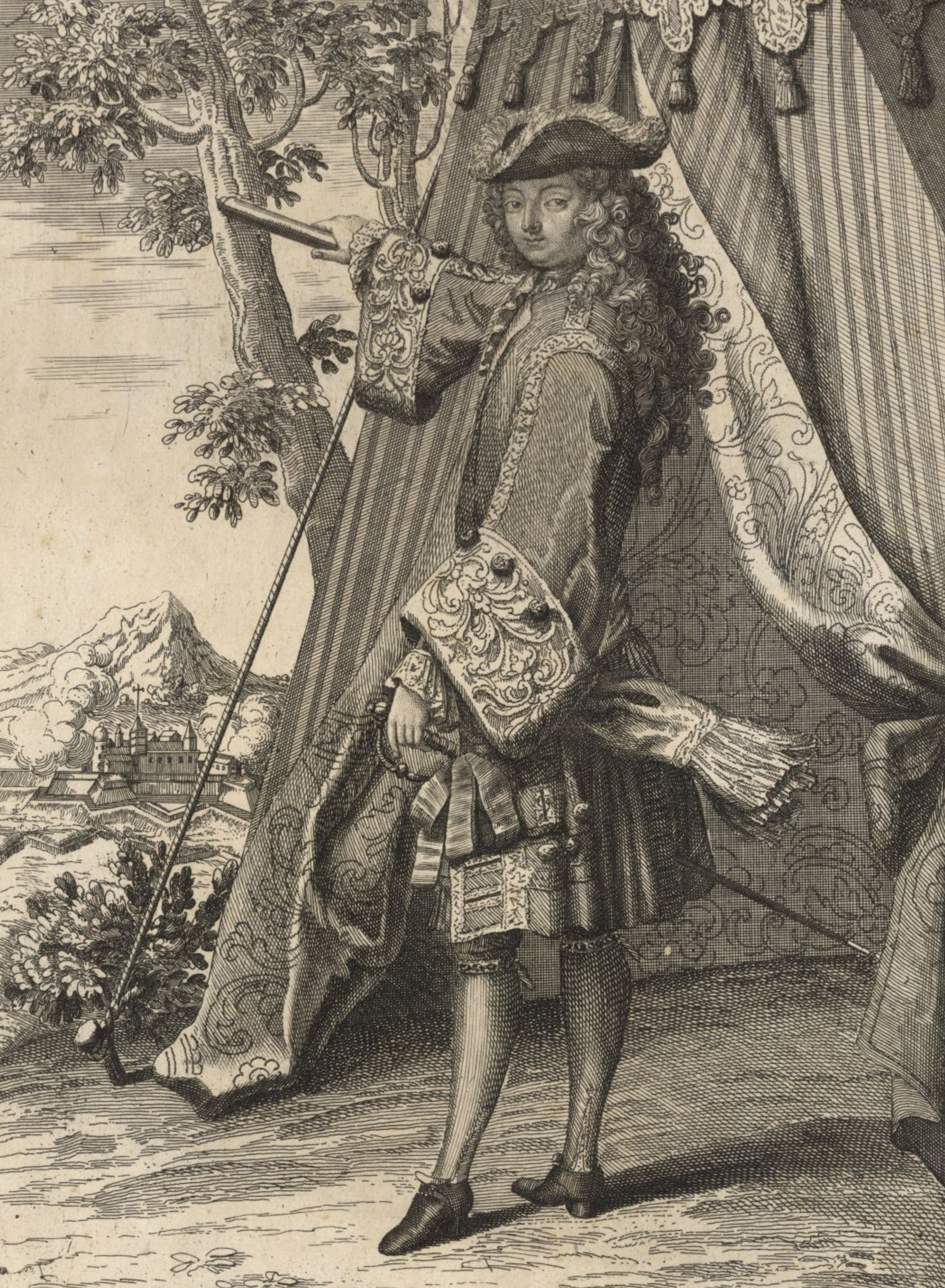
Portrait of John as Prince of Brazil by Chez Berey, c. 1706

John was born 22 October 1689 at Ribeira Palace in Lisbon, second but eldest surviving son of Peter II of Portugal and Maria Sophia of Neuburg. He was baptised on 19 November at the Royal Palace Chapel as John Francis Anthony Joseph Benedict Bernard (Note: João Francisco António José Bento Bernardo).

His elder brother, also named John, had died the previous year a few weeks after his birth. As a sign of respect, John was not given the traditional titles of the heir to the Portuguese throne, Prince of Brazil and Duke of Braganza, but merely Infante of Portugal.

In accordance with the custom of the Portuguese nobility, his education was supervised by women. Maria de Lencastre, Marchioness of Unhão, was selected as his governess, later performing the same role for his younger brothers Francisco, António, and Manuel.

The policies that John's father had pursued made the Portuguese court wealthy, the national economy stable, and the imperial military strong. This made a richly varied and interesting childhood possible for John. As a child, he was under the tutelage and heavy influence of the Jesuit Fathers Francisco da Cruz, João Seco, and Luís Gonzaga. Father Luís Gonzaga was in charge of the education of all of King Peter's children; he taught them military education, politics, astronomy, nautical studies, mathematics, and history. As John grew up, he was mentored in political affairs by Luís da Cunha, a prominent Portuguese diplomat.

=== Maturity ===
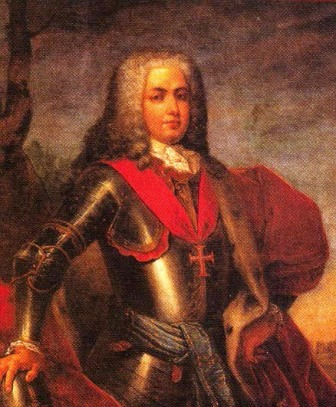
John c. 1706, aged around 17

When John reached the age of seven, his father determined that his eldest sons were sufficiently educated in basic subjects and decided to take over supervision of their instruction himself, though his interest in mentoring them quickly faded. This was formalised when he and his brother Francisco were admitted into the Order of Christ on 7 April 1696. Later that year, the King finally decided to confer on John the titles of the heir apparent, namely Prince of Brazil and Duke of Braganza. On 1 December 1696, on the anniversary of the Portuguese Restoration War of 1640, a grand ceremony was held in which John was invested with his titles. The ceremony involved the placing of a large ermine and red velvet mantle on his shoulders, as well as the adornment of his person with various jewels and royal regalia.

Just over a month before John's tenth birthday in 1699, his mother Queen Maria Sofia died at the age of 33. This caused John to retreat from court and become depressed for many months. His aunt Catherine of Braganza, the former queen consort of England, Scotland, and Ireland, then took control of his education. She resided in the palace she had built, Bemposta Palace, and remained John's main tutor and female role model until her death in 1705.

In April 1700, John fell terribly ill; it was assumed that he was on his death bed. Fearing his imminent demise, he asked for his last rites and confessed his sins. To everyone's surprise, he rallied and soon returned to his normal activities, his complete recovery being considered a miracle by the court.

John was greatly saddened by the death of his sister Teresa Maria in February 1704. Her death caused John to avoid appearing at court for some months and to estrange himself from his father, who favoured John's younger brother Manuel. During this time, much gossip was spread and worries arose about whether John would ever recover from his depression. In May of that year, he eventually returned to the court and reconciled with the King, saying that his saudade for his sister would not get in the way of his performing his duty to the King.

== Succession ==
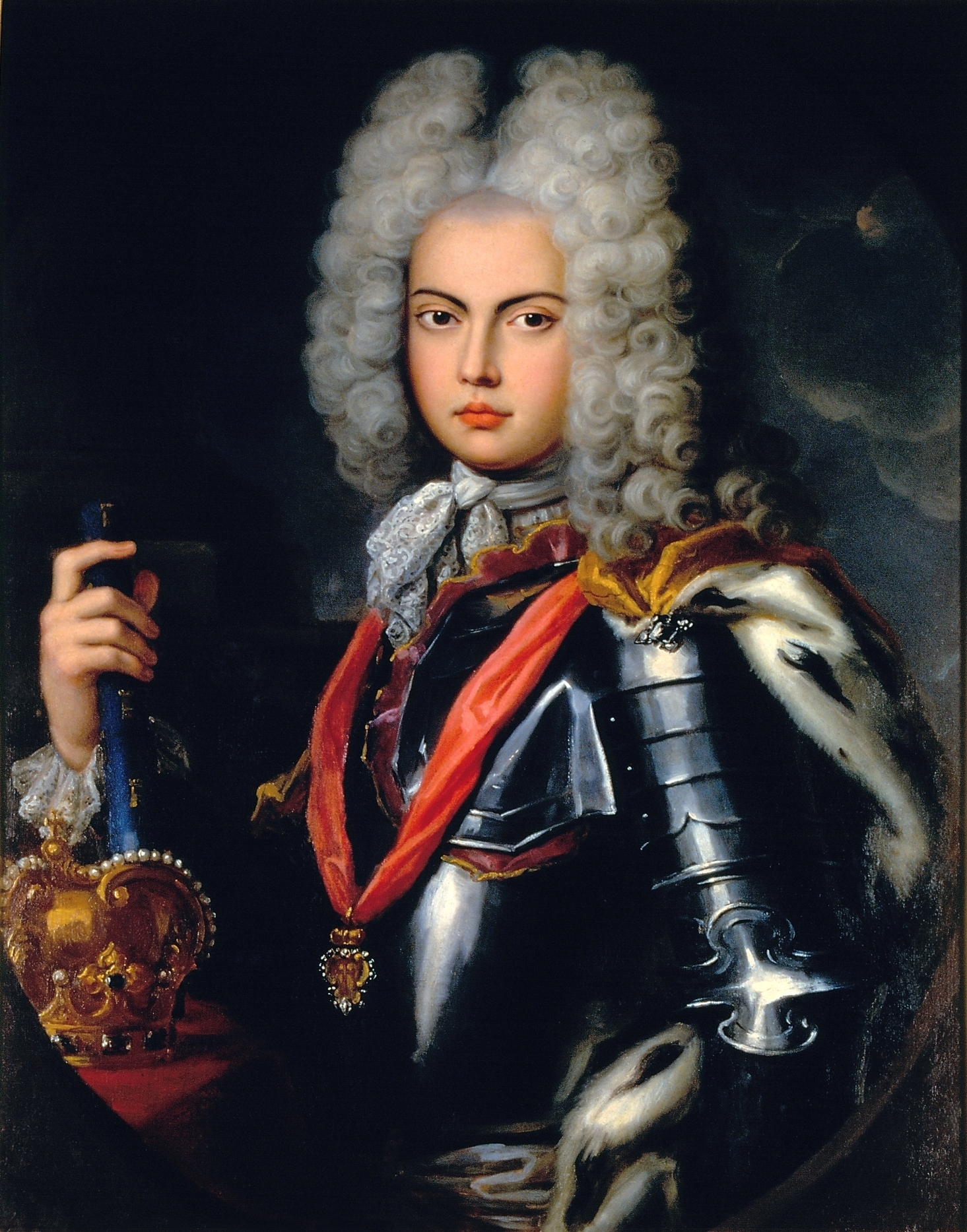
Portrait of King John V in 1707, aged 18

In early December 1706, King Peter II moved himself to the Royal Quinta in Alcântara, as he was growing ill and needed space from the court. On the fifth of that month, the King caught a high fever, and the court doctors met to examine him fully. They determined his health was greatly deteriorating. The next day, Peter called all of his children to his bedside and told them of his coming demise. He appointed John as prince regent of the kingdom and asked that all of his children follow John's wishes. The King still favoured his youngest son, Manuel, and he gave Manuel a special gift that none of his other children received.

=== Acclamation ===
Peter II died in his sleep on 9 December 1706. Following his death, Ribeira Palace was redecorated as a reflection of the mourning. On the façade towards the Terreiro do Paço, large black banners were hung from the windows for this purpose. A month later, the time was declared to be appropriate for John to be acclaimed king. Preparations for John's acclamation had already been started and once allowed, the royal palace was redecorated; the black banners were replaced with red ones, and fruit wreaths were hung throughout all of the palace.

On the day of John's acclamation, 1 January 1707, his new throne was placed on the balcony of the Torre do Rei (Tower of the King) of Ribeira Palace. Specially-made tapestries illustrating the allegories of Justice and Prudence were hung high above the Terreiro do Paço to remind the public that these were the traits their king would have. Once John sat down on his throne, wreaths made of gold were laid around the throne and balcony. Wearing his Cross of the Order of Christ, and with the Portuguese Crown Jewels beside him, and not on him, as was the Portuguese royal custom, John was acclaimed "His Majesty, by the Grace of God, King of Portugal and the Algarves, before and beyond the sea in Africa, Lord of Guinea and of Conquest, Navigation, and Commerce of Ethiopia, Arabia, Persia, and India, our Lord, John, the fifth of that name in the table of the Kings of Portugal."

John was now king of an empire that stretched four continents. He was also the head of state of a kingdom that was at war with Spain and France. His first regnal act was to renew Portugal's membership in the League of Augsburg and continue in the war alongside the English and the Habsburgs. Portugal quickly supplied more troops to aid her allies in the war. This new level of Portuguese involvement allowed John's general, António Luís de Sousa, Marquis of Minas, to capture Madrid on 28 June 1706. While Portugal put vast resources into the war, contrary to John's predecessors, who avoided conflicts in Europe, activity in the war soon lost the interest of the King, who had more pressing affairs to attend to.

=== Marriage ===
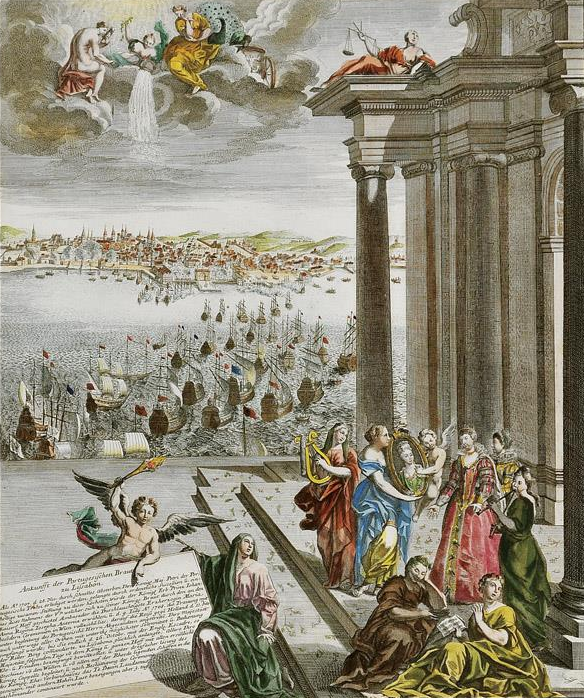
The Arrival of Maria Anna of Austria in Lisbon; Gottfried Stein, c. 1708.

During his life, Peter II had worked a long time to secure John a marriage with an Austrian archduchess in order to guarantee Portugal's alliance with the Habsburgs. John continued these negotiations and finally succeeded in negotiating a deal. On 27 June 1707, Fernão Teles da Silva, Count of Vilar Maior, signed a marriage contract with Holy Roman Emperor Joseph I that made official a match between John and the emperor's sister, the Archduchess Maria Anna of Austria, who was John's first cousin: their mothers were sisters. The contract also set the archduchess's dowry at 100,000 crowns, a vast sum for the day.

The armada that Portugal sent to escort Maria Anna from the Low Countries to Lisbon arrived in the Tagus river estuary on 26 October 1708. The flagship, in which Maria Anna travelled, berthed at the docks of the private garden of Ribeira Palace, where John and a party of the kingdom's richest and most powerful nobles met the new queen for the first time. The marriage celebrations lasted until 27 December; they were sumptuous and very costly.

By late 1710, John and Maria Anna had not produced an heir to the throne. It had been two years since the couple had been married, and the court was starting to question the future of the House of Braganza. In early 1711, the King met with Franciscan Cardinal Nuno da Cunha e Ataíde, High Inquisitor of the Portuguese Inquisition, who told him that if he promised God to build a Franciscan convent in Mafra, God would deliver his long desired heir. Accordingly, John promised such a convent if Maria Anna became pregnant before the end of 1711. John's wish would come true later that year when Maria Anna gave birth to a daughter, Maria Barbara, on 4 December 1711.

John and Maria Anna had a successful marriage, but lived largely separate lives. Maria Anna devoted herself to preserving the decorum of the royal court and her own religious interests, while John concerned himself with whatever pleased him at the moment. John kept many mistresses throughout his royal career, including Filipa de Noronha, Paula de Odivelas, Luísa Inês Antónia Machado Monteiro, Madalena Máxima de Miranda, Inácia Rosa de Távora, and Luísa Clara de Portugal.

=== Offspring ===
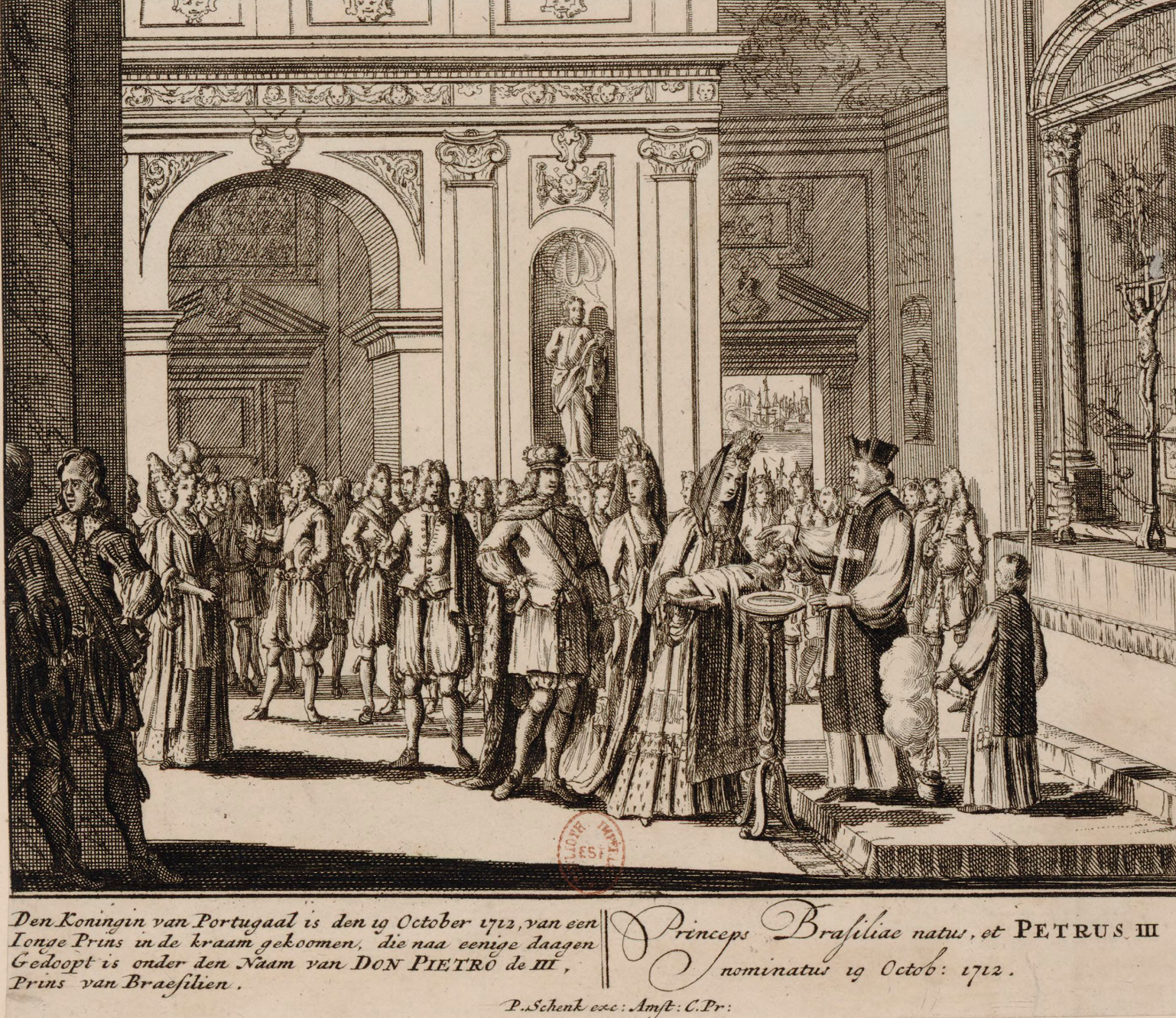
The Royal Family at the Baptism of Pedro, Prince of Brazil; German, c. 1712.

Maria Barbara's birth was followed by the birth of Pedro, Prince of Brazil, on 19 October 1712, which temporarily gave John a male heir. Prince Pedro's death on 29 October 1714 greatly saddened the King, but he took solace in the fact that his son Joseph (now Prince of Brazil) had been born on 6 June earlier that year. After Joseph, three more infants were born to John and Maria Anna: Carlos on 2 May 1716, Pedro on 5 July 1717, and Alexandre on 24 September 1723. Only two of their three youngest sons would survive to adulthood, Infante Carlos and Infante Pedro; only Pedro continued the Braganza line.

John's children were trained rigorously growing up. His plan was to have an intelligent son who could take his place as king, a strategically married daughter, and well-prepared statesmen sons, but he would achieve only part of his goal. From her birth, Infanta Maria Barbara's marriage had been closely arranged and monitored by John. When the engagement of Mariana Victoria of Spain to Louis XV of France was nullified, John proposed Maria Barbara as a possible bride for Louis XV, but in the end she was refused. John still managed to gain something from the dissolution of the engagement between Louis XV and Mariana Victoria: John's heir Prince José would be engaged to Mariana Victoria, and Maria Barbara would marry Mariana Victoria's older half-brother Prince Don Ferdinand (later King Don Ferdinand VI of Spain). Negotiations between Portugal and Spain began in 1725, and four years later John's eldest children would be matched with their spouses-to-be. The infantas Maria Barbara and Mariana Victoria were exchanged at a ceremony, called the Exchange of the Princesses (Troca das Princesas), held on the Caia River on 19 January 1729. Prince José married Mariana Victoria on 19 January 1729 in Elvas, and Infanta Maria Barbara married Prince Ferdinand on 20 January 1729 in Badajoz.

None of John's three other sons would marry in his lifetime. Infante Alexandre died at the age of five, and Infante Carlos died at the age of twenty without any marriage proposals or children. Only Infante Pedro would live long enough to marry, but John did not live long enough to see it. Pedro married his niece Maria Francisca, Princess of Brazil, on 6 June 1760; she was the daughter of his elder brother, King Dom Joseph I. When Joseph died in 1777, Maria Francisca and Pedro became Queen Dona Maria I and King Dom Pedro III.

John fathered at least four children from various extramarital affairs. António of Braganza by Luísa Inês Antónia Machado Monteiro; Gaspar of Braganza, Archbishop of Braga, by Madalena Máxima de Miranda; José of Braganza, High Inquisitor of Portugal, by Paula de Odivelas; and Maria Rita of Braganza by Luísa Clara de Portugal. António, Gaspar, and José were all recognized as John's sons and were collectively known as the Children of Palhavã, after the Palace of Palhavã that belonged to Luís Carlos Inácio Xavier de Meneses, 1st Marquis of Louriçal, where they lived at John's expense. The Children of Palhavã received educations worthy of nobility and went on to become noteworthy members of the clergy. Maria Rita was never officially recognized as John's daughter, but he informally arranged for her life at the Convent of Santos and managed her expenses. Maria Rita's stepfather, Jorge de Meneses, attempted to stop John's actions for Maria Rita, but the King had de Meneses exiled to Spain and then to England.

== Regnal politics ==
John reigned as an absolute monarch. Notably, he never convened the Portuguese Cortes, the ancient parliament of the three estates in Portugal, and actively ignored meetings of the Council of State. However, John did not act by himself when making decisions; rather, he frequently consulted a close circle of well-informed advisers and held weekly intimate audiences with members of all three estates, which he preferred to larger institutions, such as the Cortes and the Council of State, which he viewed as incompetent and bloated. The Count of Povolide remarked on John's governance style, stating that "he established a predominance of personal consultation over institutional consultation."

=== Government ===
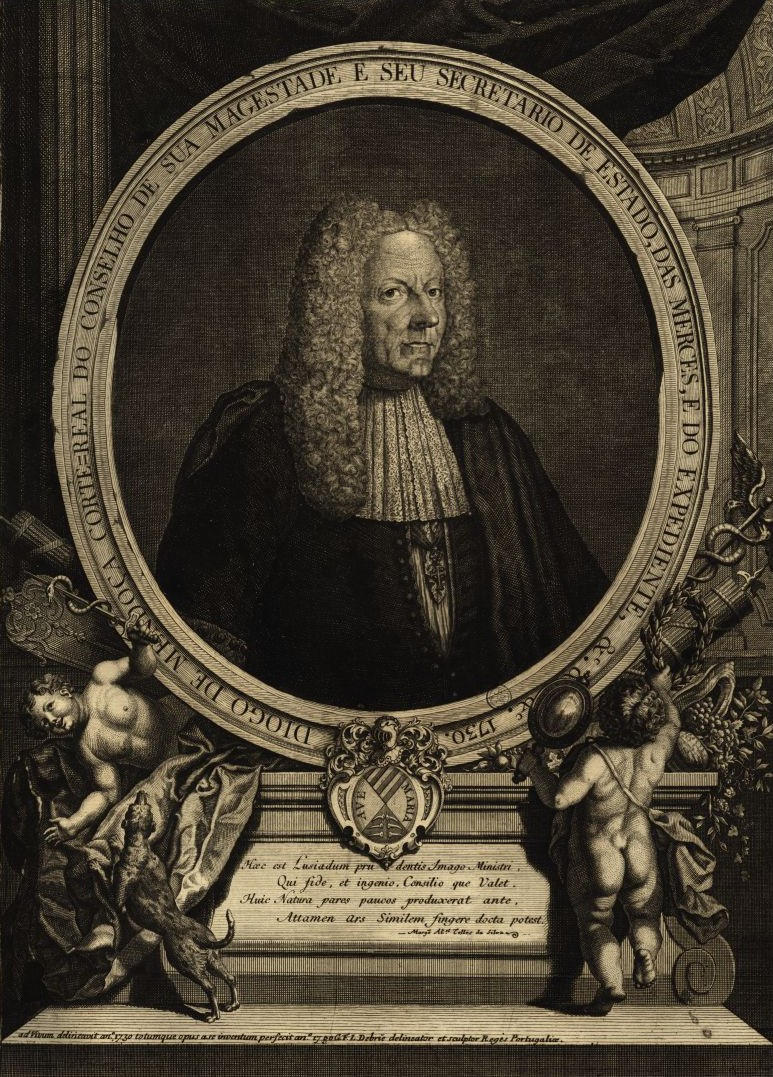
Diogo de Mendonça Corte-Real, Secretary of State of the Kingdom

The highest position in the King's government was that of Secretary of State of Portugal, the equivalent of a modern-day prime minister. This position was always filled by a favourite of John, the most notable one Diogo de Mendonça Corte-Real, whom the King consulted with on every matter, to such a degree that it often appeared that he was the King's only minister. When John became king, he inherited a powerful and large Council of State made up of numerous bishops, nobles, and bureaucrats, which was charged with being the utmost consultory body to the King, as it was during the reign of John's father. However, John's dislike of institutions and consultative bodies led him to cease convening the council formally, leading the prominent politician and diplomat Luís da Cunha to refer to the king as a despot and his government as absolutist. The historian A.R. Disney writes of John that he "was an absolutist by conviction and believed secular power and authority emanated by right solely from the king, to whom all other persons and jurisdictions were completely subordinate."

Although the Council of State was never convened, several of its members were nonetheless close advisers to the King. Alongside Diogo de Mendonça Corte-Real, Cardinal João da Mota e Silva and High-Inquisitor Nuno da Cunha e Ataíde were close advisers to the king, the former eventually substituting Mendonça Corte-Real as Secretary of State when he died in 1736. Though he disbanded most institutions, John notably maintained the Junta of the Three Estates, a governing junta created by John IV (John V's grandfather) which managed the finances and maintenance of military installations, troop raising, and taxation related to defense. Having engaged in multiple conflicts throughout his reign, both in Europe and his empire, John V understood the necessity of the junta and carefully picked its members, only selecting those deemed the most knowledgeable and competent. Similarly, he maintained the Council of the Treasury, which managed the finances of Portugal and its empire, including tax collection and budget accounting for the majority of Portugal's organizations (except the military), and exerted authority over the Casa da Índia, the Royal Mint, and the custom houses across Portuguese territory.

=== European relations ===
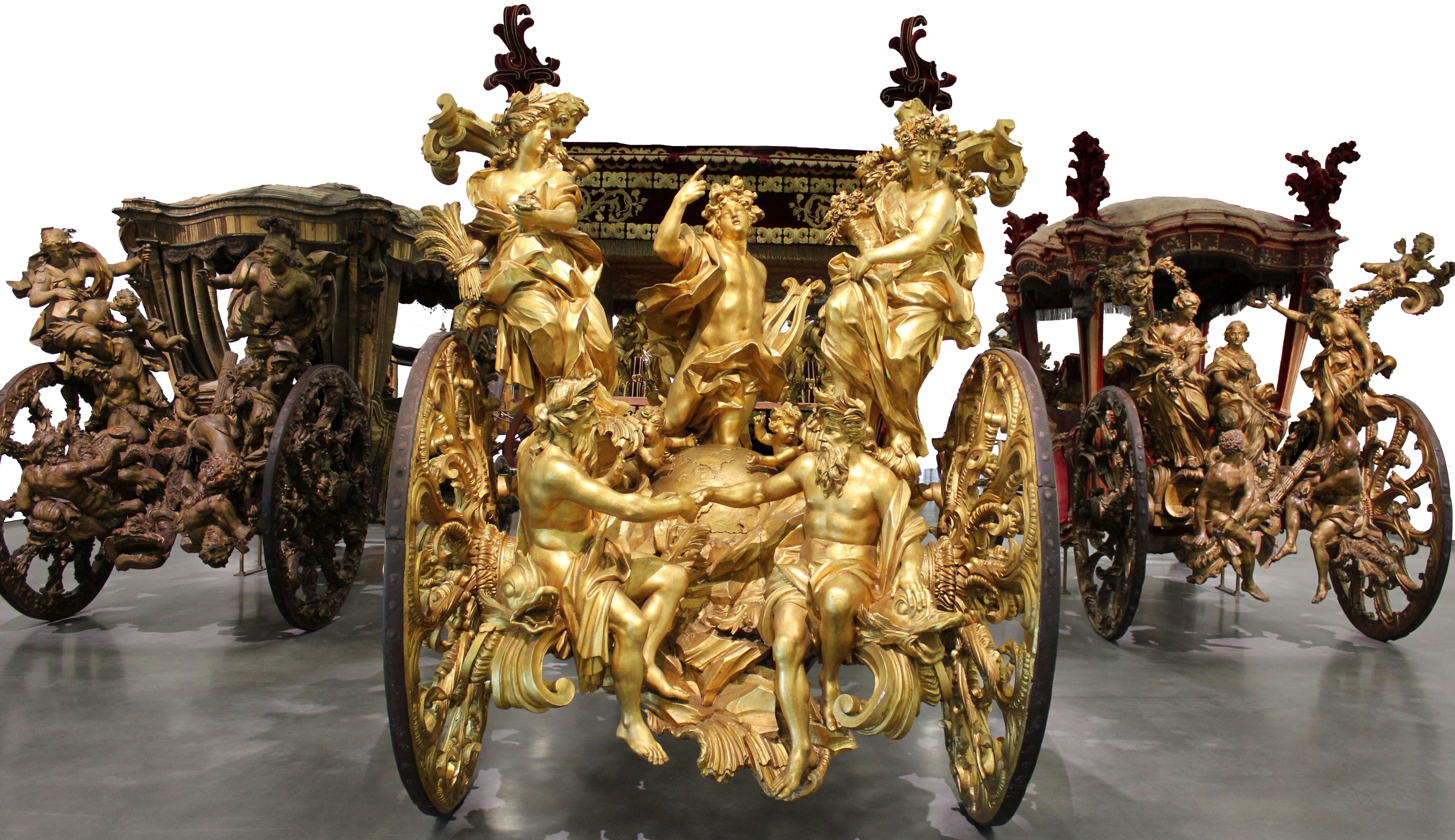
The three triumphal coaches used in the triumphal entry of the 1716 Portuguese envoy to Rome.

John pursued a generally dovish foreign policy which sought to maintain Portugal's neutrality. The main exception to this was Portuguese intervention in the War of the Spanish Succession (1701–13).

When John ascended the throne, he found himself entangled in the War of the Spanish Succession, as King Peter II had signed the Methuen Treaty in 1703, which aligned Portugal to the Grand Alliance against the House of Bourbon and allowed Grand Alliance forces to launch their invasion of Spain from Portugal. Only months after assuming the throne, John saw his forces overwhelmingly defeated in at the Battle of Almansa, a defeat that jeopardized Portuguese forces in Spain and the outcome of the war. Portuguese forces continued to fight alongside the Grand Alliance until agreeing to an armistice with Spain and France on 8 November 1712. The war finally came to an end in 1713 with the signing of the Treaty of Utrecht, whereby Portugal regained possession of territories conquered by the Bourbon coalition and acquired new territories in South America.

With the War of the Spanish Succession ended, John could re-establish relations with the courts of Europe. His first grand act of diplomacy was the dispatch of Luís Manuel da Câmara, 3rd Count of Ribeira Grande, as his ambassador to the court of Louis XIV of France, in early August 1715. The grandson of François, Prince of Soubise, and cousin of Hercule Mériadec, Prince of Guéméné, the Count of Ribeira Grande was personally chosen by John to foster amicable relations with the French court. No expense was spared on the Count's triumphal entry into Paris, which cost 100 Louis d'or and received such great applause from the people of Paris that Alexandre de Gusmão, the Count's secretary, stated that "the Count of Ribeira Grande has eternalized the grandness of our generous king." Although King Louis would die only weeks after the Portuguese embassy's arrival to France, the richness and extravagance of its entry to Paris was noted at the French court and across Europe and gained a new level of prestige for John and his kingdom.

As John concerned himself with the presentation of Portugal at the court of Europe from home through the planning and organization of important embassies, the King's brother Infante Manuel, Count of Ourém, was similarly raising the name of Portugal throughout Europe. Having left the country in 1715 without the King's permission (as was required for royalty and high nobility), Manuel traveled throughout Europe, staying with Portuguese ambassadors and nobles across the continent, causing quite a fanfare. The King was displeased that Manuel left without permission, but he forgave his brother, writing to Manuel "your age absolves your mistake". Now having the King's permission, Manuel entered the service of Prince Eugene of Savoy, serving alongside him at the successful Battle of Petrovaradin. Over the next 17 years, Infante Manuel moved from court to court as a celebrity and military hero and was even considered as a candidate as King of Poland by provision of the 1732 Treaty of the Three Black Eagles. Manuel's adventures throughout the continent inspired several literary works and gained him celebrity, raising Portugal's prestige in the eyes of Europe.

=== Catholic Church ===
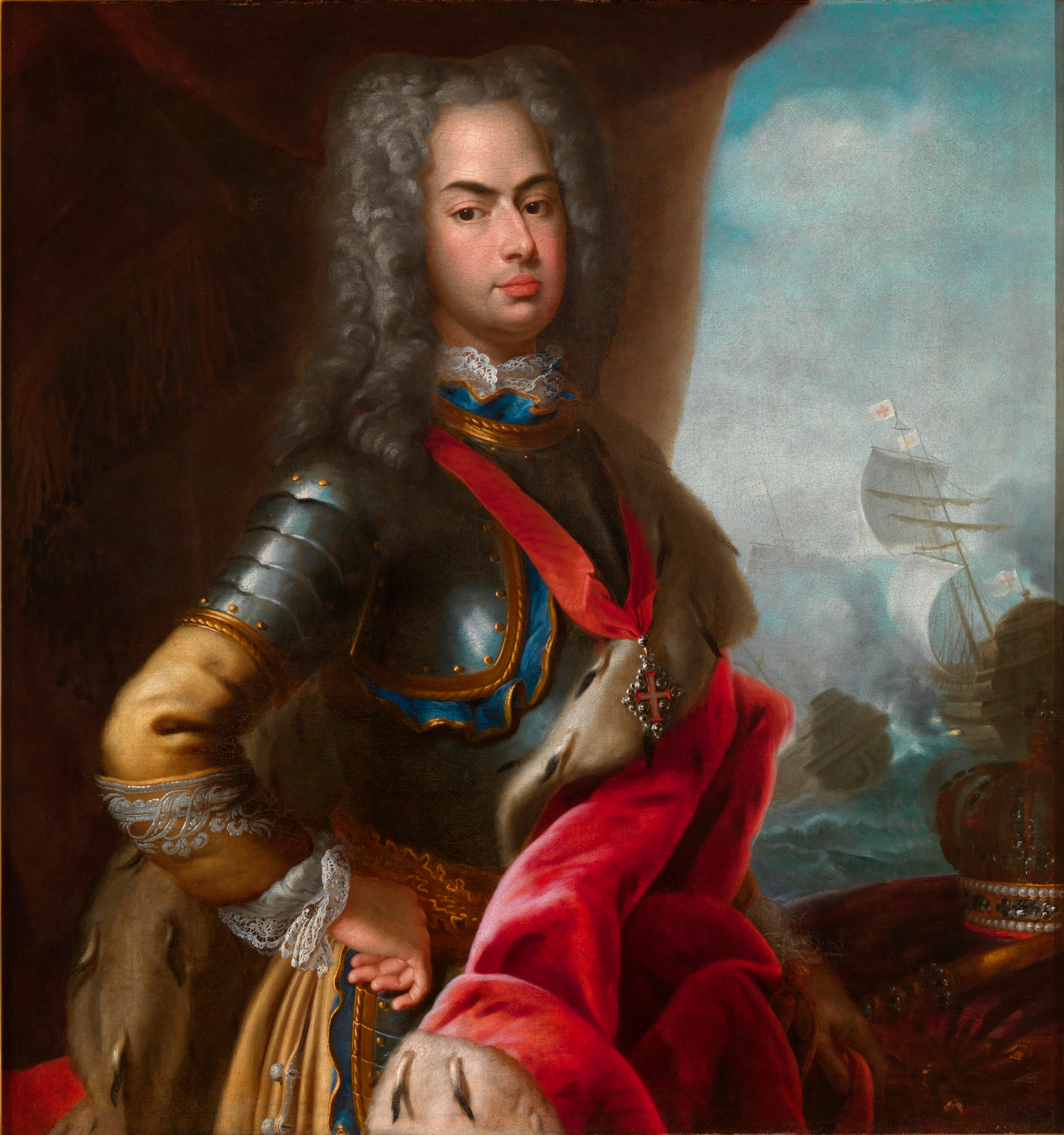
John V of Portugal at the Battle of Matapan; Domenico Duprà, 1719.

John's reign was characterized by a stressed importance of relations with Rome and the Papacy, though the state of relations with the Holy See largely depended on the pope at the time. John sought acknowledgement by the pope as a lawful and righteous monarch as a means of international recognition of his capabilities and authority. Relations with John's first pope, Clement XI, were largely successful, resulting from mutual beneficial agreements. In 1716, in response to a request by Pope Clement XI to John for aid in the fight against the Turks, the King sent an armada of Portuguese ships to assist Venice and Austria in their conflicts with the Turks that was led by his brother Infante Francisco, Duke of Beja, and Lopo Furtado de Mendonça, Count of Rio Grande. In the same year, John ordered a formal, triumphal entry for his ambassador in Rome, Rodrigo Anes de Sá Almeida e Meneses, 3rd Marquis of Fontes. Seeking to mimic the response received at the French court, 5,000 cruzados were spent on a luxurious entry for the Portuguese envoy. The ceremonial procession included a convoy of 300 carriages surrounding the pièce de résistance of the procession, the Oceans Coach, an ornate carriage made in Lisbon to demonstrate the wealth of the Portuguese empire to Rome. This impressed the papal court, and Pope Clement raised the dignity of the Archdiocese of Lisbon to the Patriarchate of Lisbon, making the Portuguese capital only one of two dioceses with this title in Europe, alongside Venice. John's good fortune with the papacy and Italy would continue to raise the next year, in 1717, when the aid of a Portuguese squadron of ships helped win the Battle of Matapan, in the ongoing Ottoman-Venetian War.

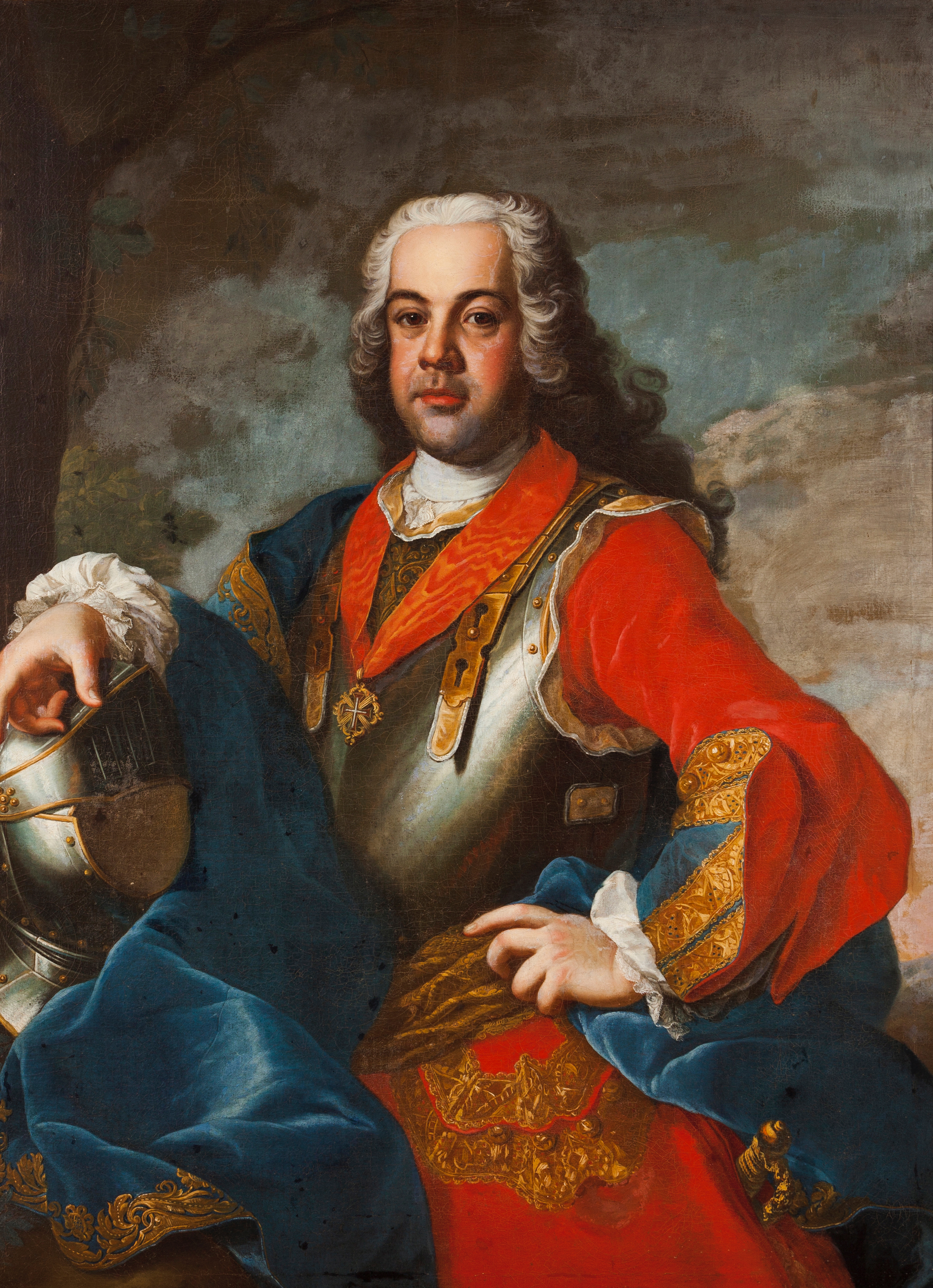
Infante Francisco, Duke of Beja, commanded the Portuguese armada requested by Pope Clement XI.

Clement XI's successor, Innocent XIII, had served as Apostolic Nuncio to Portugal from 1697 to 1710, at the court of John and his father King Peter II. However, Innocent XIII's time in Portugal is cited to have been the source of his dislike of the Society of Jesus, owing to the immense power that the Jesuits held at the Portuguese court and the concessions they held across the Portuguese Empire at the time. An ongoing issue of importance to the Portugal was the long-standing Chinese Rites controversy, which largely concerned the methods used in Asia by the Jesuits, which were largely under patronage of the Portuguese. Innocent's decision to prohibit the Jesuits from continuing their missions in China caused great upset at the Portuguese court. Though Innocent XIII's successor, Benedict XIII, was the only pope to descend from Portuguese royalty (descending from King Denis), relations were no warmer with Portugal than under his predecessor. Discontent with the Vatican's dismissal of his requests, John retaliated against Benedict XIII in 1728, closing the Papal Nunciature in Lisbon, recalling all Portuguese cardinals from Rome, and prohibiting official relations between Portuguese subjects and the Holy See. Benedict sought to resolve the issues through an amicable intermediary, King Don Philip V of Spain, though John refused.

An issue of significance to John concerned the rank and appointment of the Apostolic Nuncio in Portugal, which the King wished to be raised to the dignity of a crown-cardinal and demanded input in the selection process. Both Clement XI and Innocent XIII had denied John's requests and Benedict XIII had failed to mediate a resolution. Only during the fourth papacy of John's reign was the issue resolved, when Pope Clement XII acquiesced to the king's demands, in 1730, elevating the Portuguese nunciature to the dignity shared only with France, Austria and Spain. John's last pope and Clement XII's successor, Benedict XIV, had a markedly better relation with the King, granting the King his desired recognition as a lawful Christian monarch. In 1748, the Pope awarded the title of "Most Faithful Majesty" to John and his successors.

=== Imperial administration ===
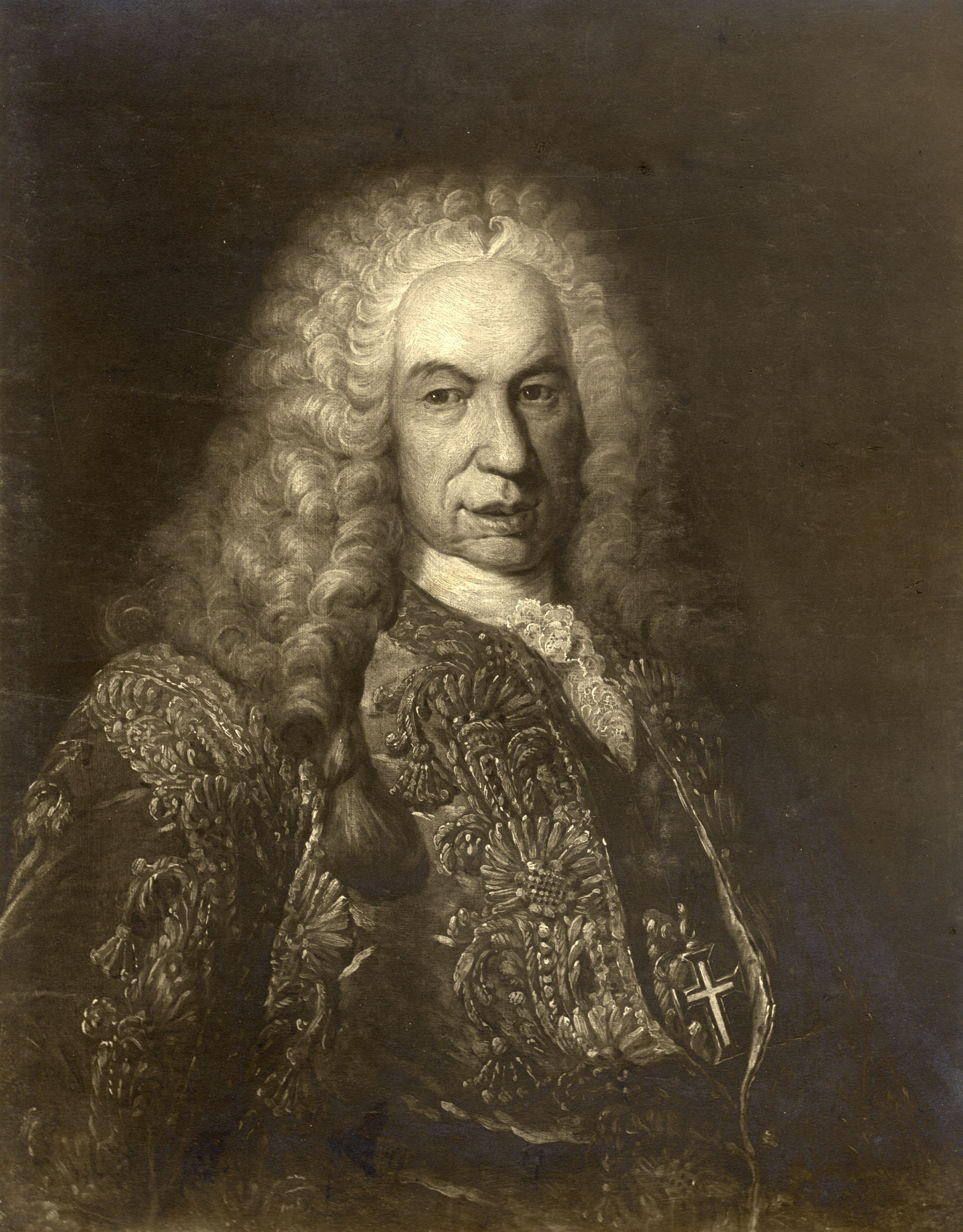
Luís da Cunha negotiated Portugal's annexation of Uruguay at the Congress of Utrecht.

John's reign saw the rise of the Americas as the bastion of Portuguese imperial power, as fortunes became less lucrative in Asia and Africa. Under John, the Portuguese Empire saw territorial gains in modern-day Brazil, India, Kenya, Uruguay, East Timor, Angola and Mozambique, among others. John sought to exert strict control over the government, trade and communications of his overseas imperial possessions.

Americas

Portuguese America occupied the highest priority in John's administration of the Portuguese Empire. The American colonies of Brazil and Maranhão had become vital sources of wealth to the royal treasury, making the protection, expansion and good governance of Portuguese America crucial to imperial policy in the Joanine era. Expansion of Portuguese territory in the Americas was also a concern, which was primarily achieved through military incursions into the interior of the continent by Bandeirantes. Portugal also regained control of Uruguay following the Treaty of Utrecht, in 1714, and successfully defended it against an attempted Spanish reconquest in the Spanish–Portuguese War of 1735–37.

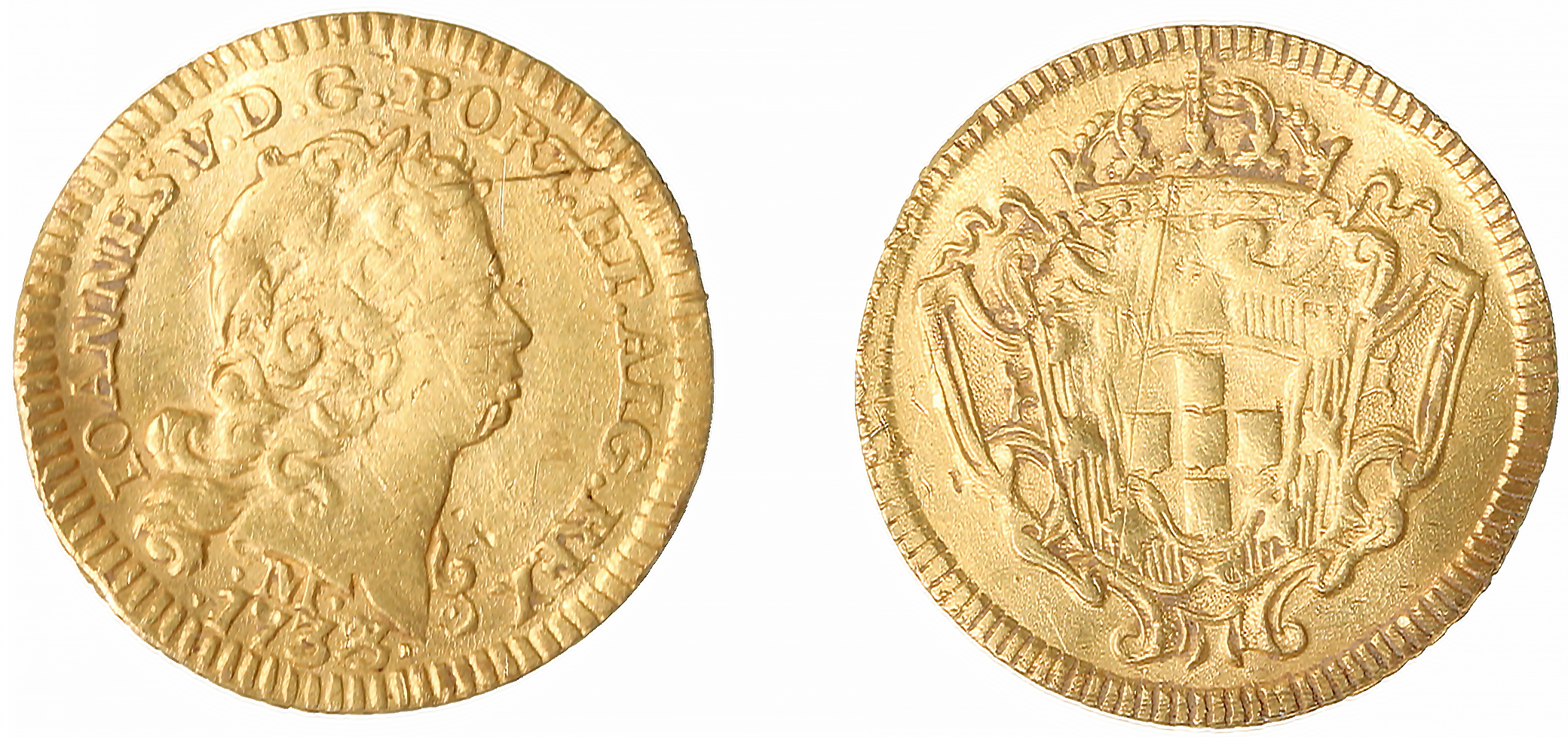
1733 gold coin of Portugal minted in Colonial Brazil

In the 1690s, during the final years of King Peter II's reign, precious resources were discovered in Brazil, namely vast gold and diamond deposits. However, exploitation of the resources primarily began in John's reign, with the establishment of mining companies, taxation systems and a mercantilist supply chain, which ushered in a period known as the Brazilian Gold Rush. The royal fifth was instituted as a form of taxation on mining activities, requiring a fifth of all gold to go directly to the King's treasury. In an effort to consolidate royal authority while promoting efficient governance, John took control of the Captaincy of São Vicente (in 1709) and the Captaincy of Pernambuco (in 1716), establishing direct royal governance in the two most valuable provinces of Brazil. In 1721, John ordered the separation of the region of intense mining from the rest of the Captaincy of São Vicente, into the autonomous captaincy of Minas Gerais (General Mines), allowing for the colonial administration to collect taxation more effectively.

Asia

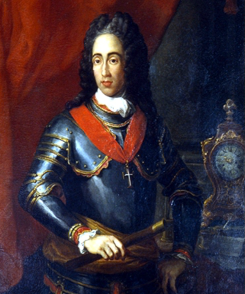
The 5th Count of Ericeira served as Viceroy of India and reestablished Portuguese dominance and commerce.

Asia had been the traditional base of the Portuguese Empire's wealth and power, but its declining returns became especially noticeable during John's reign as gold and diamonds from the Americas flowed to Lisbon. Portuguese India, historically the "crown jewel" of the empire, was economically constrained, especially under the restrictive rule of the Portuguese Inquisition in Goa, which prohibited commerce with non-Christian merchants. Concurrently, Portugal's most important ally in the Indian subcontinent was the Mughal Empire, which entered into a drastic decline following 1707, coinciding with the rise of the Maratha Empire, long-time enemies of the Portuguese. Portugal suffered territorial losses after the Battle of Vasai and the Maratha conquest of Baçaim, although the size of Portuguese India would triple from 1713 to 1788, in an era known as the Novas Conquistas (New Conquests). The declining importance of Portuguese India resulted in numerous administrative reorganizations during John's reign, including the independence of Portuguese Mozambique from rule by the Viceroy of Portuguese India, as well as the creation of a direct commercial route from Portugal to Portuguese Macau (present day China), which eliminated the stop at the Indian port of Goa.

Africa

The Portuguese colonization of Africa was less important to John's colonial priorities compared to the Americas and Asia. Minor contentions with Dutch corsairs blocking shipments to and from the Portuguese Gold Coast in the 1720s resulted in successful Portuguese victory over the Dutch in minor naval battles. Notable, tensions were also raised with Britain in 1722 when British forces established a fortification in Cabinda (in modern-day Angola), which had been claimed and evangelized by the Portuguese since the 15th century. A notable rare exception to the long-standing Anglo-Portuguese Alliance, John ordered galleons from the Armada do Brasil to dispatch to Cabinda, known as the Cabinda Expedition, to either take possession of the fort or destroy it and its men, resulting in a Portuguese victory in 1723. Portugal briefly reconquered Mombasa (modern-day Kenya) in 1728, only to lose control over it again in 1729, ending the last period of Portuguese rule in Mombasa.

== Joanine culture ==
=== Mafra ===
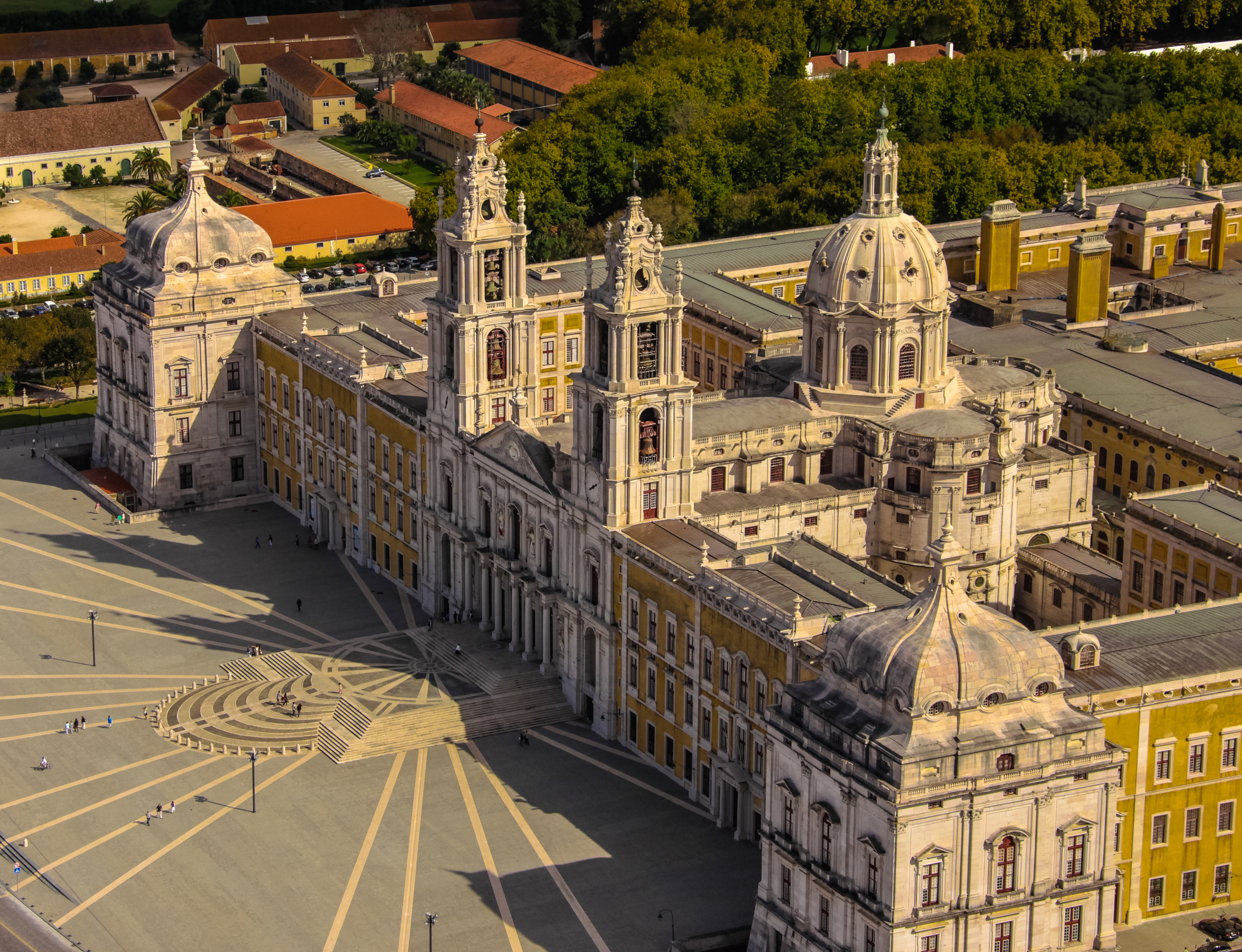

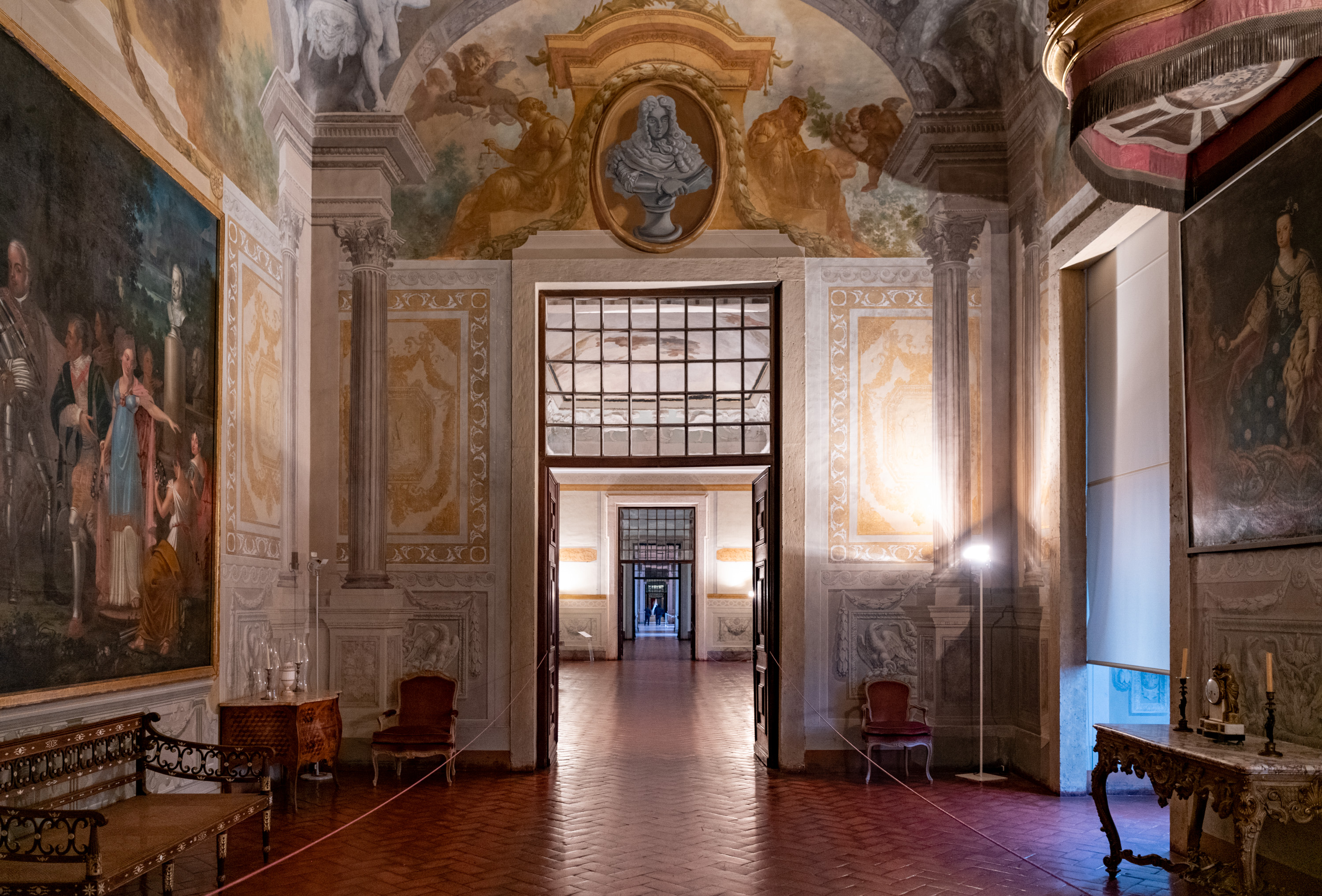
The Royal Palatial Complex at Mafra was built from 1717 to 1755 to project John's power and wealth.

John is often remembered as one of the greatest patrons of the arts in Portuguese history, having commissioned numerous construction projects and artistic studies. The King's most famous and important work was the Royal Palace-Convent of Mafra. By early 1711, John was worried for the future of the House of Braganza, since his marriage to Maria Anna of Austria had produced no issue. He met with Dom Nuno da Cunha e Ataíde, High-Inquisitor of Portugal, who assured the King that if he promised to build a convent for Franciscans in Mafra, in the Lisbon countryside, Maria Anna would bear him a child by the end of 1711. John agreed to do so. Construction started in 1717, with plans for a modest church convent for one hundred friars. However, in the following years, with a gratuitous flow of gold from slave labour in the American colonies of Brazil and Maranhão, the plans were altered to become a magnum opus of John's reign, accommodating three hundred friars and adjusted to become a hybrid convent-palace, including a royal library, a basilica, and a vast set of apartments for the royal family. Noting the vast size and scope of the project, Charles de Merveilleux, a Swiss nobleman living in Portugal in 1726, remarked that "King John has decided to build a second Escorial."

With the new plans for a palatial complex, the project at Mafra, entrusted to royal architect João Frederico Ludovice, became much more than a fulfillment of a religious promise, but rather a demonstration of monarchical power and wealth. By 1729, 15,470 workers from throughout Portugal and its colonies were contributing to the construction of the palace, alongside a total of 6,124 infantrymen and cavalrymen, making a total of 21,594 persons involved in the building process and site that year. While the majority of the palace was completed by 1730, John was so consumed in completing the project that he decreed it mandatory for all inhabitants of the villages of Mafra and Ericeira to work at the palace, requiring an excused permission not to participate, and only under extraordinary circumstances. In regard to the exuberant cost of the palatial complex, Merveilleux remarked that "three quarters of the royal treasury and nearly all of the gold brought on the fleets from Brazil were here, at Mafra, turned into stone."

Mafra stood as a monument to regal power, even though it would become only a pleasure palace and never a seat of authority. John commissioned numerous operas, comedies and serenades to be celebrated at the palace with great pomp, and its enormous property became the favoured hunting grounds of the royal family for centuries to come. In 1732, the King also began to celebrate his birthday annually at Mafra. John housed one of the largest and most sumptuous libraries in Europe within the palace, with over 36,000 volumes dating from the 14th to the 18th centuries. Works at Mafra would continue until 1755, when the devastation wreaked by the Great Lisbon earthquake required as many workers as possible to rebuild the city.

=== Illness and death ===
John suffered three strokes in 1742, leaving him paralyzed on the left side of his body and prone to violent seizures for the remainder of his life. Despite developing severe edema, he remained active in government and refused to allow Crown Prince José to assume an active role in governing. His health deteriorated rapidly in 1749, and he fell into a state of melancholy. He died on 31 July 1750 at the age of 60.

== Titles and styles ==
The official style of John V was "John the fifth, by the Grace of God, King of Portugal and the Algarves before and beyond the sea in Africa, Lord of Guinea and of Conquest, Navigation, and Commerce of Ethiopia, Arabia, Persia, and India, etc."

The official style of address changed throughout his reign. John notoriously earned the title of fidelissimus (Latin for 'most faithful') for him and his heirs. That title is still, to this day, attached to Portugal itself.

John was also awarded the sobriquet Rex Fidelissimus (Latin for 'Most faithful king') for him and his successors, making the Portuguese monarchy the only monarchy in Europe with a sobriquet.

Throughout his life, John held the following titles:

- 22 October 1689 – 1 December 1696: His Highness the Most Serene Infante João of Portugal
- 1 December 1696 – 9 December 1706: His Royal Highness the Prince of Brazil, Duke of Braganza, etc.
- 9 December 1706 – 23 December 1748: His Majesty the King of Portugal and the Algarves
- 23 December 1748 – 31 July 1750: His Most Faithful Majesty the King of Portugal and the Algarves

== Genealogy ==
=== Ancestry ===
Ancestors of John V of Portugal

8. Teodósio, 7th Duke of Braganza
4. John IV of Portugal
9. Ana de Velasco y Girón
2. Peter II of Portugal
10. Manuel, 8th Duke of Medina Sidonia
5. Luisa de Guzmán
11. Juana de Sandoval y de la Cerda
1. John V of Portugal
12. Wolfgang William, Count Palatine of Neuburg
6. Philip William, Elector Palatine
13. Magdalene of Bavaria
3. Maria Sophia of Neuburg
14. George II, Landgrave of Hesse-Darmstadt
7. Elisabeth Amalie of Hesse-Darmstadt
15. Sophia Eleonore of Saxony

=== Issue ===
| Name | Portrait | Lifespan | Notes |
By Maria Ana of Austria (7 September 1683 – 14 August 1754; married by proxy on 27 June 1708)
| Barbara, Queen of Spain | Painting showing the top three quarters of a young woman wearing a silk orange and pink dress with a powdered whig | 4 December 1711 – 27 August 1758 | Married Don Ferdinand VI of Spain. She had no surviving children from this marriage. |
| Pedro, Prince of Brazil | Painting showing a young boy seated (Prince Pedro) with an older girl by his side (Barbara of Braganza) | 19 October 1712 – 29 October 1714 | Prince of Brazil from birth to his death |
| Joseph I of Portugal | Painting showing half of a young man wearing a silver armour breast plate with a purple velvet suit with a powdered whig | 6 June 1714 – 24 February 1777 | King of Portugal from 1750 until 1777. He was married to Mariana Victoria, daughter of King Don Philip V of Spain. He had four children from this marriage. |
| Infante Carlos of Portugal | | 2 May 1716 – 1 April 1736 | He died at the age of 19, of a fever. |
| Peter III of Portugal | Painting showing half of a young man wearing a silver waistcoat with a blue velvet suit with a powdered whig | 5 July 1717 – 25 May 1786 | King of Portugal, jure uxoris, from 1777 until 1786. He was married to his niece, Queen Dona Maria I of Portugal. Peter and Maria had six children. |
| Infante Alexandre of Portugal | | 24 September 1723 – 2 August 1728 | He died at the age of 4 of smallpox. |
By Luísa Inês Antónia Machado Monteiro
| António of Braganza | | 1 October 1714 – 14 August 1800 | One of the three Children of Palhavã. John V recognized him and gave him a share of his estate. |
By Madalena Máxima de Miranda (c. 1690 – )
| Gaspar of Braganza | | 8 October 1716 – 18 January 1789 | Archbishop-Primate of Braga from 1758 until 1789. One of the three Children of Palhavã. John V recognized him and gave him share of his estate. |
By Paula de Odivelas (1701 – 1768 )
| José of Braganza | | 8 September 1720 – 31 July 1801 | High Inquisitor of the Portuguese Inquisition from 1758 until 1777. One of the three Children of Palhavã. John V recognized him and gave him share of his estate. |
By Luísa Clara de Portugal (21 August 1702 – 31 August 1779)
| Maria Rita of Braganza | | 28 May 1731 – 27 November 1808 | Nun at the Convent of Santos, in Lisbon. John V did not officially recognize her, but he paid for her expenses. |

== See also ==
- List of Portuguese monarchs
- House of Braganza

== Bibliography ==
- Azevedo, Joaquim (1789). Chronologia dos Summos Pontifices Romanos Extrahida dos Melhores Authores da Historia Ecclesiástica (in Portuguese). Lisbon: Regia Officina.
- Bernardes Branco, Manoel (1886). Portugal na Epocha de D. João V (in Portuguese). Lisbon: Livraria Antonio Maria Ferreira.
- Bianchini, Francesco (2012). Observations Concerning the Planet Venus. Berlin: Springer Science & Business Media.
- Brandão, José (2015). Este é o Reino de Portugal (in Portuguese). Lisbon: Edições Saída de Emergência.
- Brasão, Eduardo (1938). Relações Exteriores de Portugal: Reinado de D. João V (in Portuguese). Vol. I. Porto: Editora Record.
- Brasão, Eduardo (1938). Relações Exteriores de Portugal: Reinado de D. João V (in Portuguese). Vol. II. Porto: Editora Record.
- Brasão, Eduardo (1938). Relações Exteriores de Portugal: Reinado de D. João V (in Portuguese). Vol. III. Porto: Editora Record.
- Carmo Reis, A. do (1987). Atlas de História de Portugal (in Portuguese). Vol. V. Lisbon: Edições Asa.
- Caetano de Sousa, António. História Genealógica da Casa Real Portuguesa (in Portuguese). Vol. VIII. Lisbon: Silviana.
- Disney, A. R. (2009). A history of Portugal and the Portuguese empire : from beginnings to 1807. Volume 1, Portugal. Cambridge University Press. ISBN 978-0-511-65027-7. OCLC 559058693.
- Disney, A. R. (2012). A history of Portugal and the Portuguese empire : from beginnings to 1807. Volume 2, The Portuguese Empire. Cambridge University Press. ISBN 978-0-511-81333-7.
- Figueiredo, Lucas (2011). Boa Ventura! A Corrida do Ouro no Brasil 1697–1810 (in Portuguese). Vol. II. Rio de Janeiro: Editora Record.
- Francis, David (1975). The First Peninsular War: 1702–1713. London: Ernest Benn Limited.
- Freire Costa, Leonor; Rocha, Maria Manuela (2007). Remessas do Ouro Brasileiro: Organização Mercantil e Problemas de Agência em Meados do Século XVIII (in Portuguese). Vol. VIII. Lisbon: Análise Social.
- Jenkins, Robert Charles (1894). The Jesuits in China and the Legation of Cardinal de Tournon: An Examination of Conflicting Evidence and an Attempt at an Impartial Judgment (in Portuguese). Boston: Harvard University Press.
- Jumar, Fernando (2004). Colonia del Sacramento y el Complejo Portuario Rioplatense (in Spanish). México: Instituto Panamericano de Geografía e Historia.
- Lisboa, João Luís; C. P. dos Reis Miranda, Tiago; Olival, Fernando (2002). Gazetas Manuscritas da Biblioteca Municipal de Èvora (in Portuguese). Vol. I. Lisbon: Edições Colibri.
- Lynn, John A. (1999). The Wars of Louis XIV: 1667–1714. London: Longman.
- Monteiro, Saturnino (1989). Batalhas e Combates da Marinha Portuguesa (in Portuguese). Vol. VII. Lisbon: Livraria Sá da Costa Editora.
- Nizza da Silva, Maria Beatriz (2009). Reis de Portugal: D. João V (in Portuguese). Lisbon: Temas & Debates.
- Pimentel, Alberto (1892). As Amantes de D. João V (in Portuguese). Lisbon: Typografia da Academia Real das Sciencias.
- Pimentel, António Filipe (2007). António Canevari e a Arcádia Romana: Subsídios para o Estudo das Relações Artísticas Lisboa-Roma no Reinado de D. João V. (in Portuguese). Coimbra: University of Coimbra.
- Rendina, Claudia (2005). I Papi (in Italian). Vol. I. Roma: Newton & Compton Editori.
- Roberts, Jenifer (2009). The Madness of Queen Maria: The Remarkable Life of Maria I of Portugal. Templeton Press.
- Sieradzki, Paweł (2006). Obecność rodziny książąt Czartoryskich na ziemi jarosławskiej (in Polish). Lublin: Polish Academy of Sciences.
- Silva, Luiz Geraldo (2001). A Faina, a Festa, e o Rito: Uma Etnografia Histórica Sobre as Gentes do Mar (Séculos XVII ao XIX) (in Portuguese). Curitiba: Papirus Editora.
- Soares, Ernesto de (1937). O Infante D. Manuel 1697–1766 : Subsídios para a sua Biografia (in Portuguese). Lisbon: s.n.
- Soares de Azevedo Barbosa de Pinho Leal, Augusto (1875). Portugal – Antigo e Moderno (in Portuguese). Lisbon: Livraria Editora de Mattos Moreira & Companhia.
- Veríssimo Serrão, Joaquim (1977). História de Portugal (in Portuguese). Vol. V. Lisbon: Editorial Verbo.
- Verzijl, Jan H.W. (1973). International Law in Historical Perspective. Vol. V. Leiden: Martinus Nijhoff Publishers.

John V of Portugal House of Braganza Cadet branch of the House of Aviz Born: October 22 1689 Died: July 31 1750
Regnal titles
| Preceded by Peter II | King of Portugal and the Algarves; 9 December 1706 – 31 July 1750 | Succeeded by Joseph |
Portuguese royalty
| Vacant Title last held by João | Prince of Brazil; Duke of Braganza; 1 December 1696 – 9 December 1706 | Vacant Title next held by Pedro |
