= Arroios =

Civil parish in Lisbon, Portugal

- Civil parish
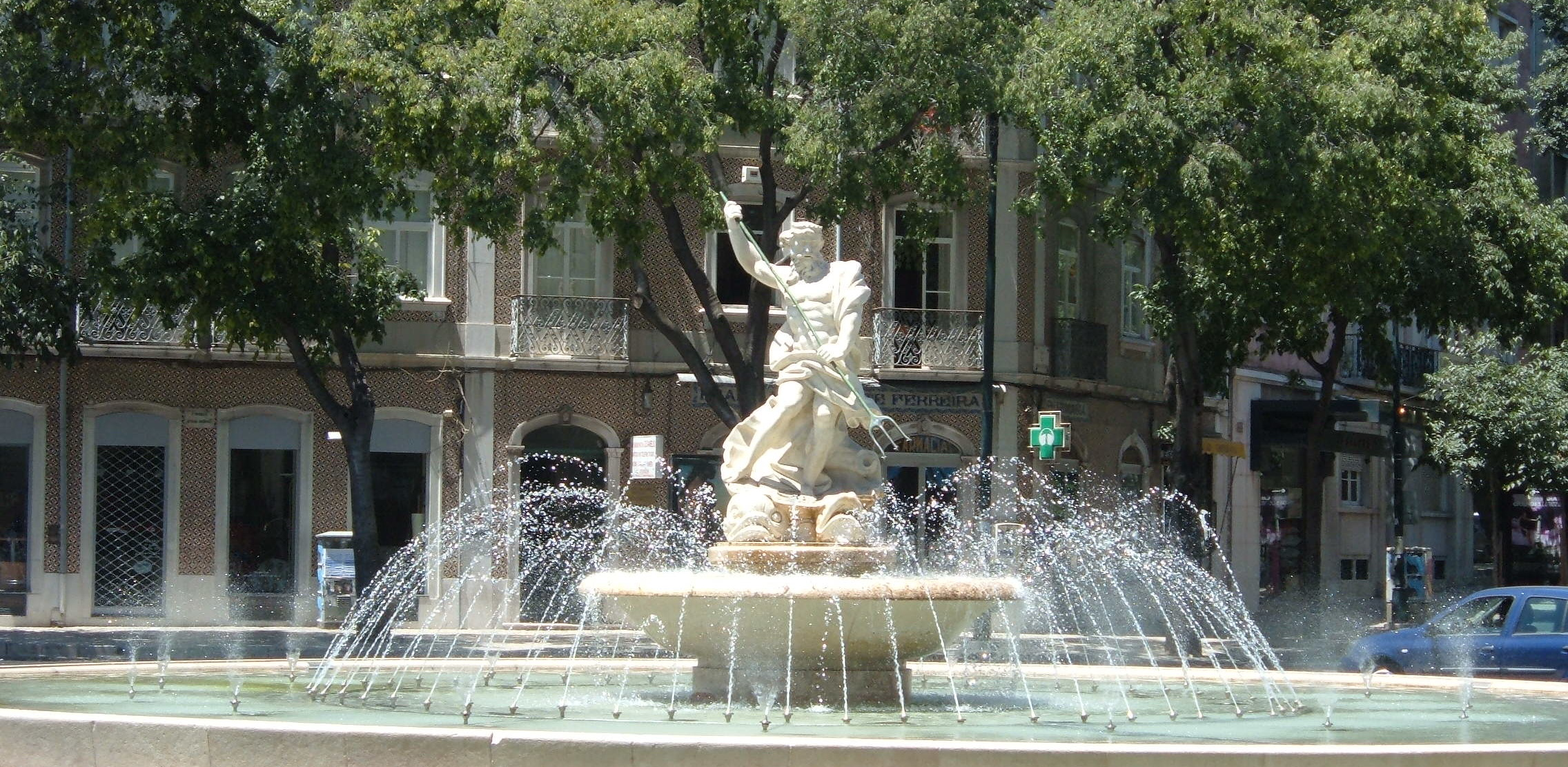
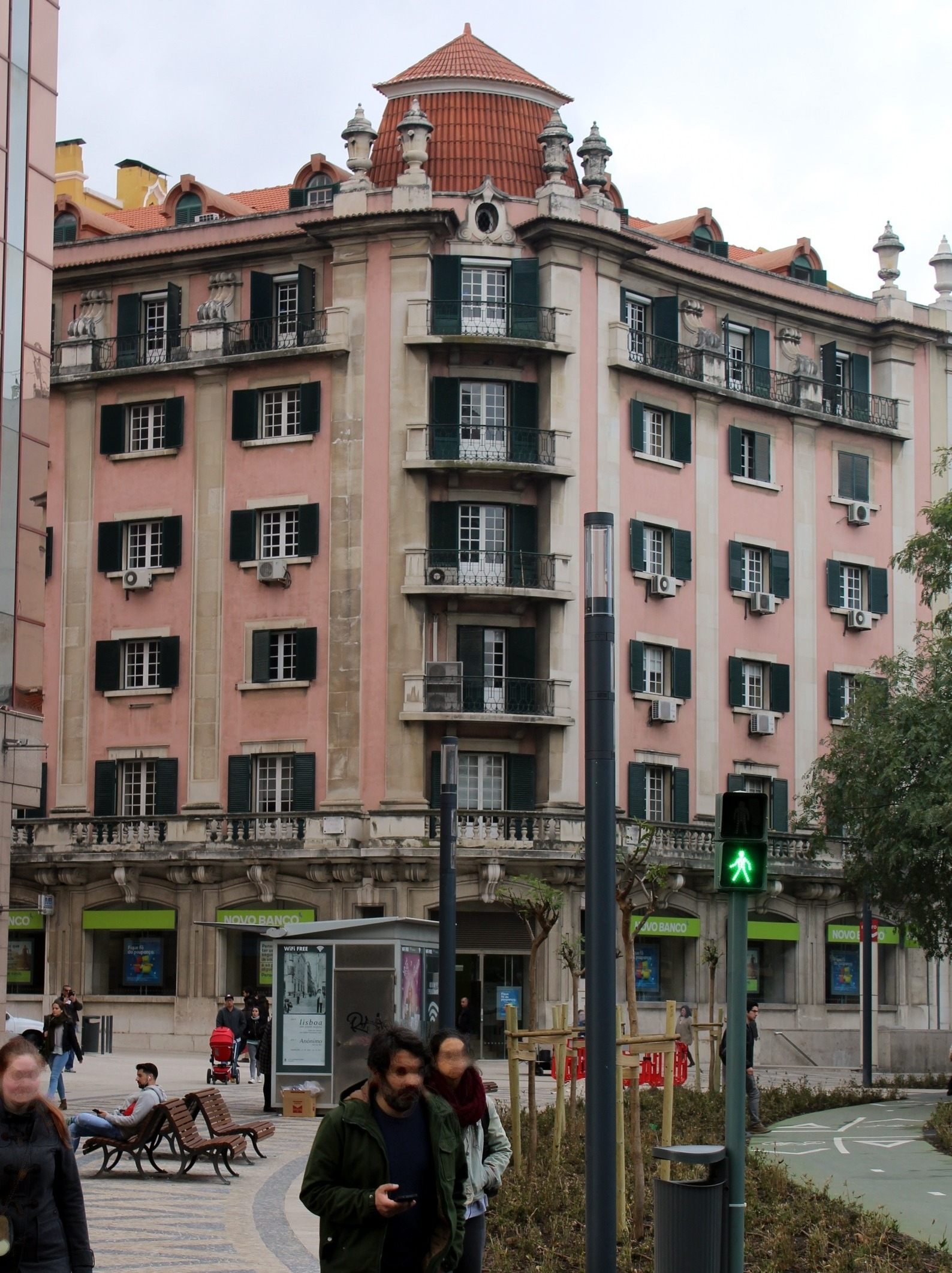
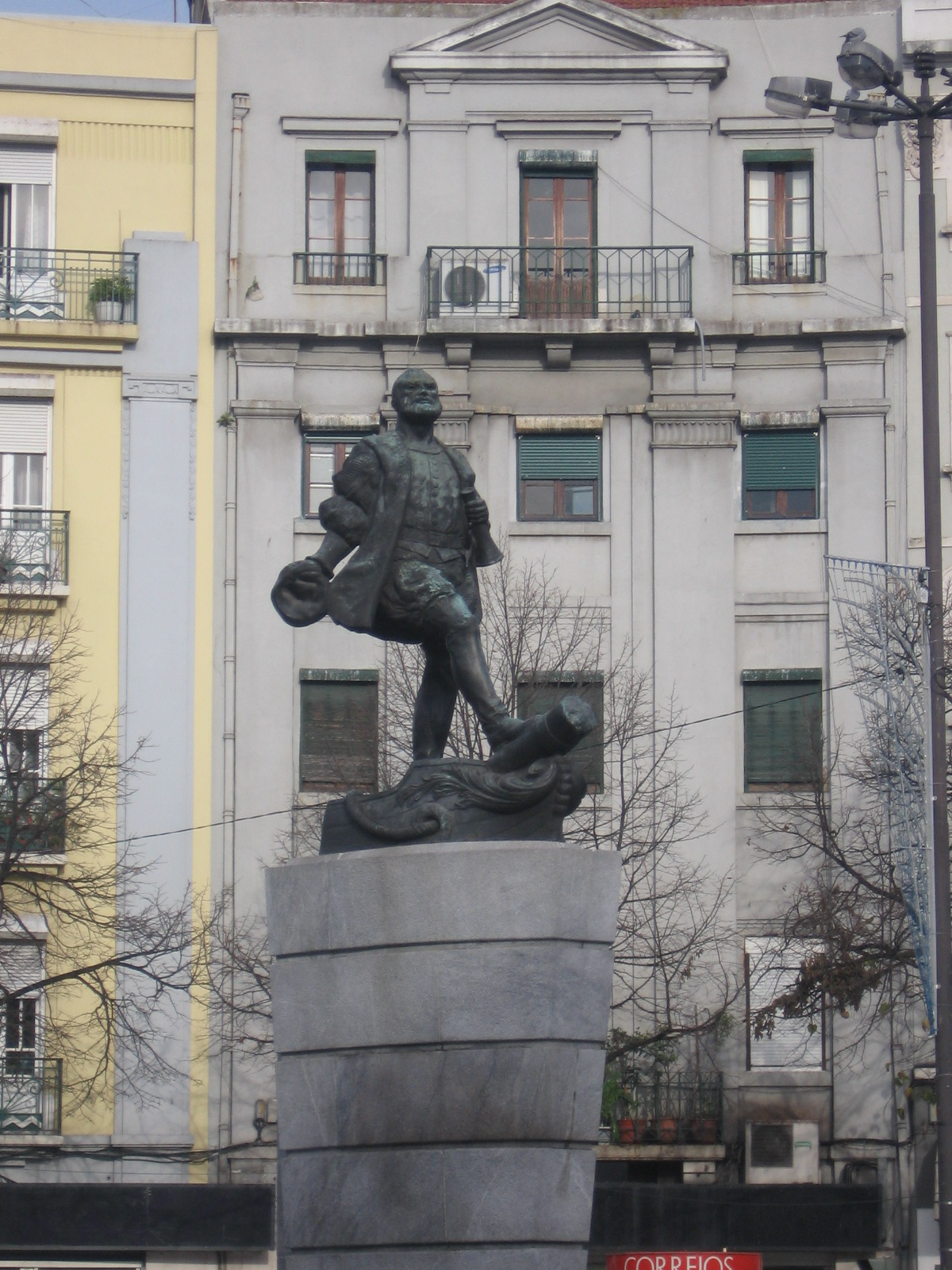
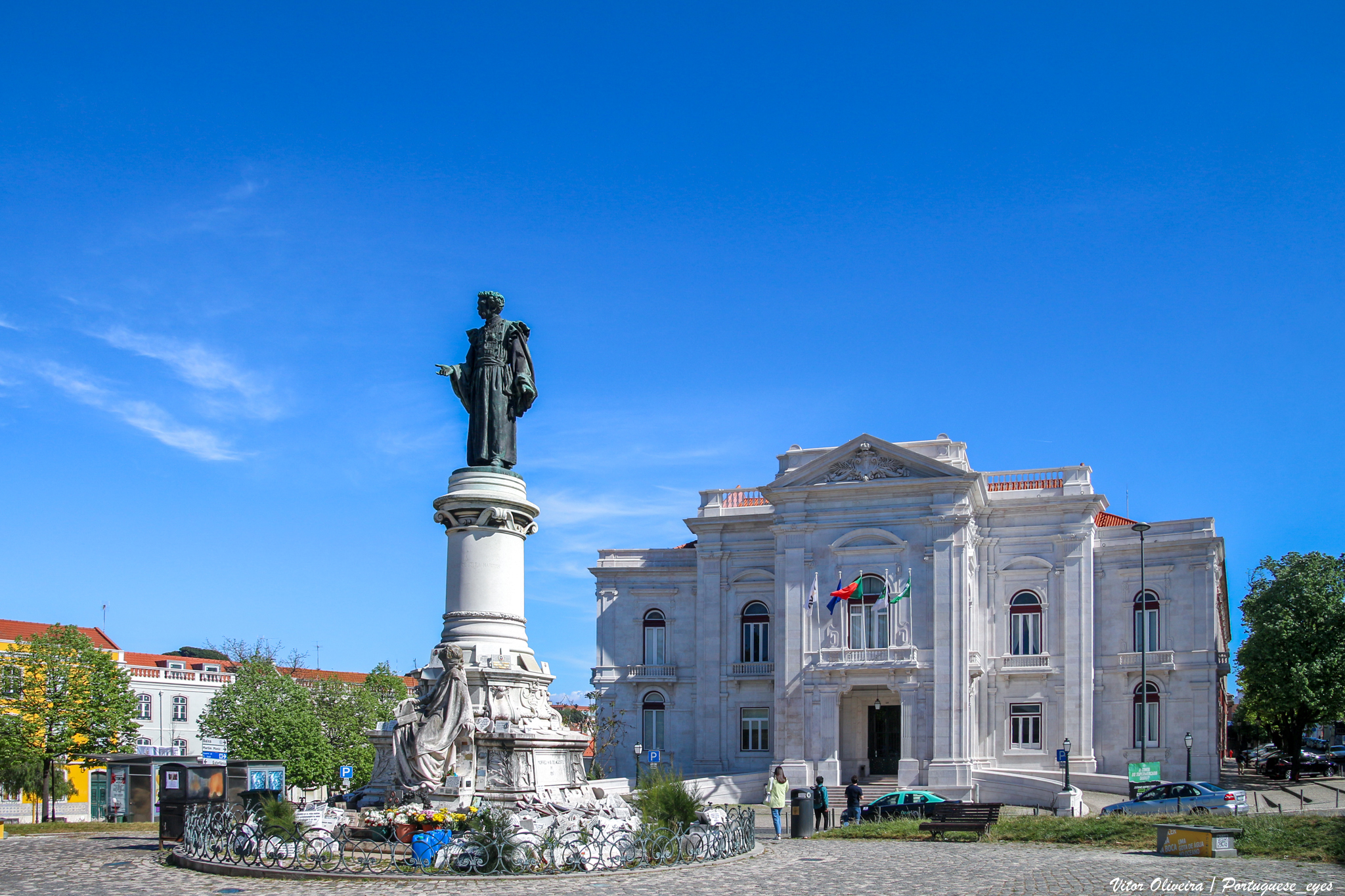
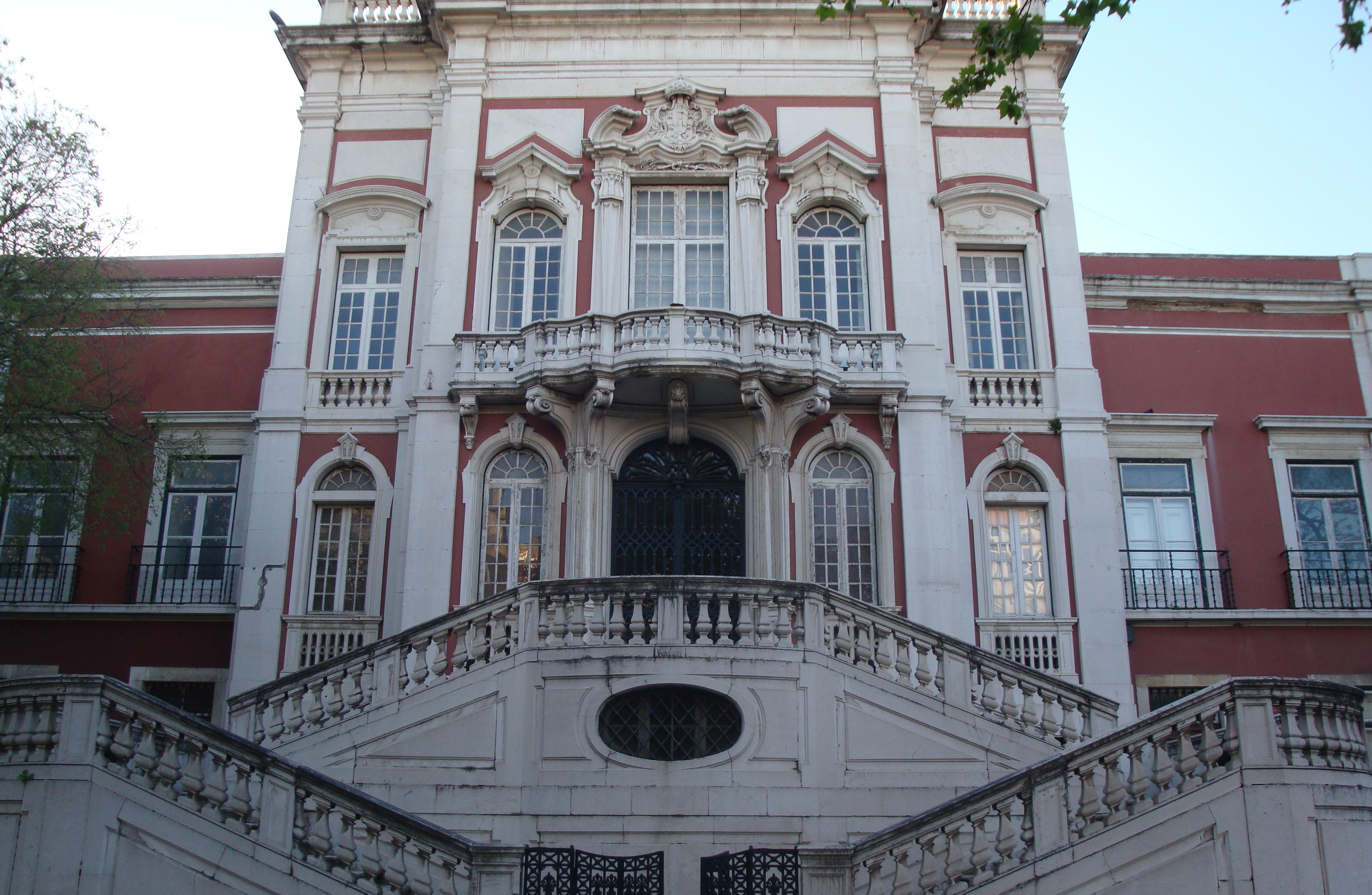
- Clockwise from top: Neptune fountain at Estefânia;Magellan statue in Praça do Chile; Paço da Rainha;Campo dos Mártires da Pátria; Saldanha

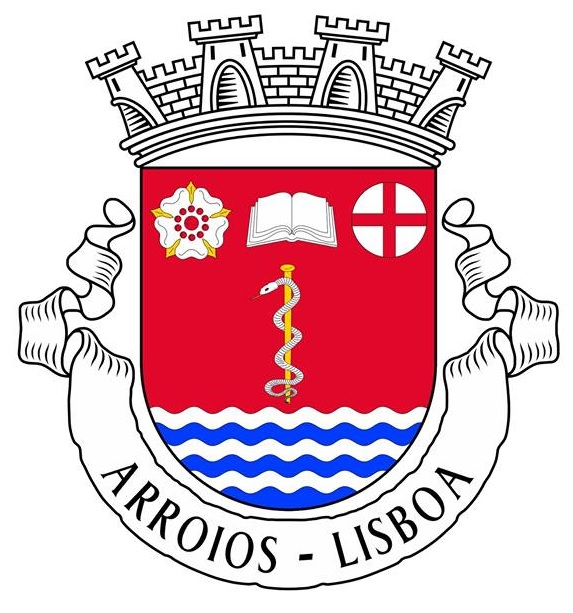
- Coat of arms

- Location of Arroios within Lisbon
- Interactive map of Arroios
- Coordinates: 38.729°N 9.138°W
- Country: Portugal
- Metro area: Lisbon
- Region: Greater Lisbon
- District: Lisbon
- Municipality: Lisbon
- Territorial Unit: Centre
- Creation: 8 November 2012
- Seat: Largo do Intendente Pina Manique 40-42; 1100-285 Lisboa

Government
  - Type: Civil parish
  - Body: Junta de Freguesia
  - President: João Jaime Pires (Viver Arroios-Viver Lisboa (PS-L-BE-PAN))

Area
  - Total: 2.13 km^{2} (0.82 sq mi)

Population (2021)
  - Total: 33,302
  - Density: 15,600/km^{2} (40,500/sq mi)
- Demonym: arroiense
- Time zone: UTC+00:00 (WET)
  - Summer (DST): UTC+01:00 (WEST)
- Postal codes: 1000, 1100, 1150, 1170
- Dicofre code (INE): 110656
- Patron saints: Saint George, Our Lady of Angels, Our Lady of Pena
- Website: https://jfarroios.pt/

Arroios (Portuguese pronunciation: [ɐˈʁojuʃ]) is a freguesia (civil parish) in the municipality of Lisbon, the capital of Portugal. Located in the city centre with an area of 2.13km^{2} in which 33,302 reside (2021), the civil parish was a result of the 2012 administrative reform, which fused São Jorge de Arroios, Anjos and Pena and takes its name from the typical quarter in the northern part of its territory.

It is currently north of Santa Maria Maior and São Vicente, east of Santo António, south of Avenidas Novas and Areeiro, and west of Penha de França.

== Toponymy ==
The name "Arroios" translated literally means brooks or streams.

== Politics and Administration ==
The civil parish was created in 2012 ahead of the 2013 local elections. Rather than move to any of the three headquarters of its former civil parishes prior to the re-organization, Arroios established its base at Intendente.

Before the election and after renovations, the building had served as the working office for the mayor of Lisbon António Costa, as a means to put the at the time run-down and stygmatised area at the heart of policy making. Arroios, in which his Socialist party had won the local elections as well, pretended to perpetuate to this, bringing decision-making closer to Avenida Almirante Reis, an avenue of the people marked by politics, and to some of its more disadvantaged communities.

Initially, to ensure proximity and continuity with the pre-2012 map, the civil parish kept all three of the former civil parish headquarters as delegations denominated as "hubs" (pólos):

- Pólo dos Anjos within the Mercado Forno do Tijolo complex (Rua Maria da Fonte), closed in late 2024. The following February it was inaugurated as a new work space for the Ephemera [pt] association.
- Pólo da Pena at Rua do Saco, 1.
- Pólo de São Jorge, at Rua Passos Manuel, 20
- Pólo do Saldanha, within the 31 de Janeiro Market (Rua Eng.º Vieira da Silva), inaugurated in 2015 and closed sometime later.

In a civil parish marked by the two inclines, this meant that while its operating base moved to the valley in between, the two slopes still had services in their proximity. Despite this, as of 2026, only Pólo da Pena remains listed as open on the civil parish page, alongside the main office - interestingly this is the closest of the four delegations to headquarters, only some 400 metres away.

=== Elections ===
Local elections are scheduled every four years, concurrently with the voting for the city's mayor and assembly. From the 2009 election, Arroios had inherited two civil parishes currently held by the left-wing Socialist Party (PS) in Pena and São Jorge de Arroios and one by the right-wing Social Democratic Party (PSD)-led coalition in Anjos. Since then, the civil parish has been highly contested between these two parties, with PS winning the first two plus the current term, separated by PSD's "Por ti, Lisboa" coalition, which managed to win in 2021. Other notable results include the formerly Arroios-based PAN's hold of an assembly member mandate in all four terms, one of their best results in the country, and the existence of a citizens-based campaign, Arroios Base, in 2021 which did not elect a member by only a few dozen votes. The next election is expected to be held in 2029.

Full summary of local elections for Arroios (Mandates won in brackets)
Election	CDU	PS	L	BE	PAN	IL	PPD/ PSD	CDS-PP	MPT	PC, PPM	A	CH	PCTP-MRPP	NC	AB (GC)	E	VP	ND	I/B	Turnout
2013	11.35 (2)	37.49 (9)		6.74 (1)	4.24 (1)		28.55 (6)			2.59			1.50						7.55	40.79
2017	9.91 (2)	39.94 (9)		10.43 (2)	5.24 (1)		15.20 (3)	12.01 (2)						2.54					4.71	45.95
2021	12.51 (3)	23.79 (5)		10.70 (2)	5.41 (1)	5.54 (1)	29.02 (6)					4.22 (1)		1.43	3.57	0.21			3.60	44.17
2025	11.67 (2)	42.34 (8)				33.26 (7)						9.59 (2)					0.69	0.51	1.94	50.20
Source: DGAI/SGMAI

==== Supra-municipal elections ====
Full summary of legislative election results in Arroios
Election	CDU	BE	L	PAN	PS	PPD/ PSD	CDS-PP	PPM	IL	CH	JPP	PCTP-MRPP	MAS	PTP	PURP/ (A)TUA	MPT	NC	PDR/ ADN	PNR/ E	RIR	A	VP	ND	PLS	I/B	Turnout
2015	7.25	10.72	3.35	2.55	33.32	36.13		0.28			0.06	0.64	0.40		0.22	0.38	0.30	0.75	0.42						3.22	58.21
2019	7.21	11.82	6.09	4.74	30.13	23.33	4.94	0.20	3.81	1.05		0.53	0.10	0.03	0.11	0.21	0.33	0.12	0.36	0.23	1.49				2.84	55.02
2022	6.16	7.31	6.27	2.40	34.15	24.73	2.02		10.07	4.40	0.06	0.25	0.13	0.03		0.10	0.07	0.24	0.03	0.10	0.02	0.17			1.28	57.24
2024	4.59	8.42	11.83	2.20	23.79	28.72			7.93	8.97	0.02	0.25		0.08		0.06		1.15	0.05	0.14	w/MPT	0.25	0.11		1.44	61.61
2025	5.36	5.09	14.46	1.88	22.41	27.55		0.08	8.68	11.10	0.03	0.21					0.03	0.90	0.18	0.10		0.27	0.13	0.11	1.44	59.79
Source:SGMAI

== Heraldry ==
The work toward the creation of a new civil parish symbology was carried out shortly after the administrative reform and Arroios' arms were officially registered in 2016. Unlike many other of the newly created parishes, Arroios did not primarily base itself on the elements used in the arms of its three former components but rather sought out to create its own identity.

It consists of «a shield gules, staff of Asclepius or with a serpent argent, animated gules and with tongue or, placed in pale; in chief a heraldic rose argent, pointed or and buttoned gules, open book argent highlighted sable and a bezant argent, laden with a cross gules; base wavy in argent and azure of six wavy bars. Mural crown argent of four towers. Banner argent of legend in sable in capital letters "ARROIOS - LISBOA".» The flag consists of a plain white field with arms at its centre and in its representation as a standard features silver and red cords and tassles, flown on the traditional golden staff and spear.

According to the civil parish, the staff of Asclepius and serpent represent education, health and culture, referencing the old convents converted into hospitals - indeed this is the case for Arroios, Desterro and the still-active São José. The heraldic rose was selected for the women and "mysticism" of the civil parish as well as the former parishes; the book and bezant represent culture, education and the arms of Saint George - the saint's red cross and a book are also two symbols directly carried over from two previous arms, São Jorge de Arroios and Pena, respectively. Finally, the blue and silver waves are meant to represent the old brooks and waterways that were present in this land and the origin of the civil parish name. While it may be argued Anjos is the only component without direct representation of its former arms, it did feature waterways in its device.
