= Infantado =

Infantado may refer to:

- House of the Infantado in Portugal
- Duke of the Infantado in Spain
- Palace of the Infantado, house of the dukes
