= João da Bemposta =

- Duke of Abrantes (jure uxoris)
Names
- João of Braganza
- House: House of Braganza
- Father: Infante Francisco, Duke of Beja
- Mother: Mariana da Silveira

D. João of Braganza, Duke of Abrantes jure uxoris (12 June 1726 - 23 October 1780), more commonly known as João da Bemposta, was a legitimized natural son of Infante Francisco, Duke of Beja. A grandson of King Pedro II of Portugal, and thus a member of the House of Braganza, João held various offices during the reigns of his uncle King João V and cousin Queen Maria I.

== Life ==
João was born to the second surviving son of King Pedro II, the Duke of Beja, and Mariana da Silveira, a nun. The popular name "da Bemposta" comes from his assuming residence at Bemposta Palace, the seat of the House of the Infantado, of which his father was the lord of.

João was legitimized, by royal decree, by his uncle, King João V, on 26 May 1749. His uncle also issued a decree, on 19 May 1750, placing João in the order of precedence lower than the Portuguese Royal Family, but above all other nobles. He served as a counselor of state and mordomo-mor (chamberlain of the royal household) for both his uncle King João V and his cousin Queen Maria I. He also served as Captain-General of the Royal Armada, the highest-ranking official of the Portuguese Navy, during the reign of Queen Maria.

During the baptism of King João VI, he represented the baby's godfather, King Louis XV of France.

== Marriage ==
João married Maria Margarida de Lorena, 2nd Duchess of Abrantes, on 20 February 1757. As the couple did not produce children, his wife's titles were inherited by her cousin, D. Pedro de Lancastre.
