= Rui Martins =

Portuguese electrical engineer (born 1957)

Rui Paulo da Silva Martins
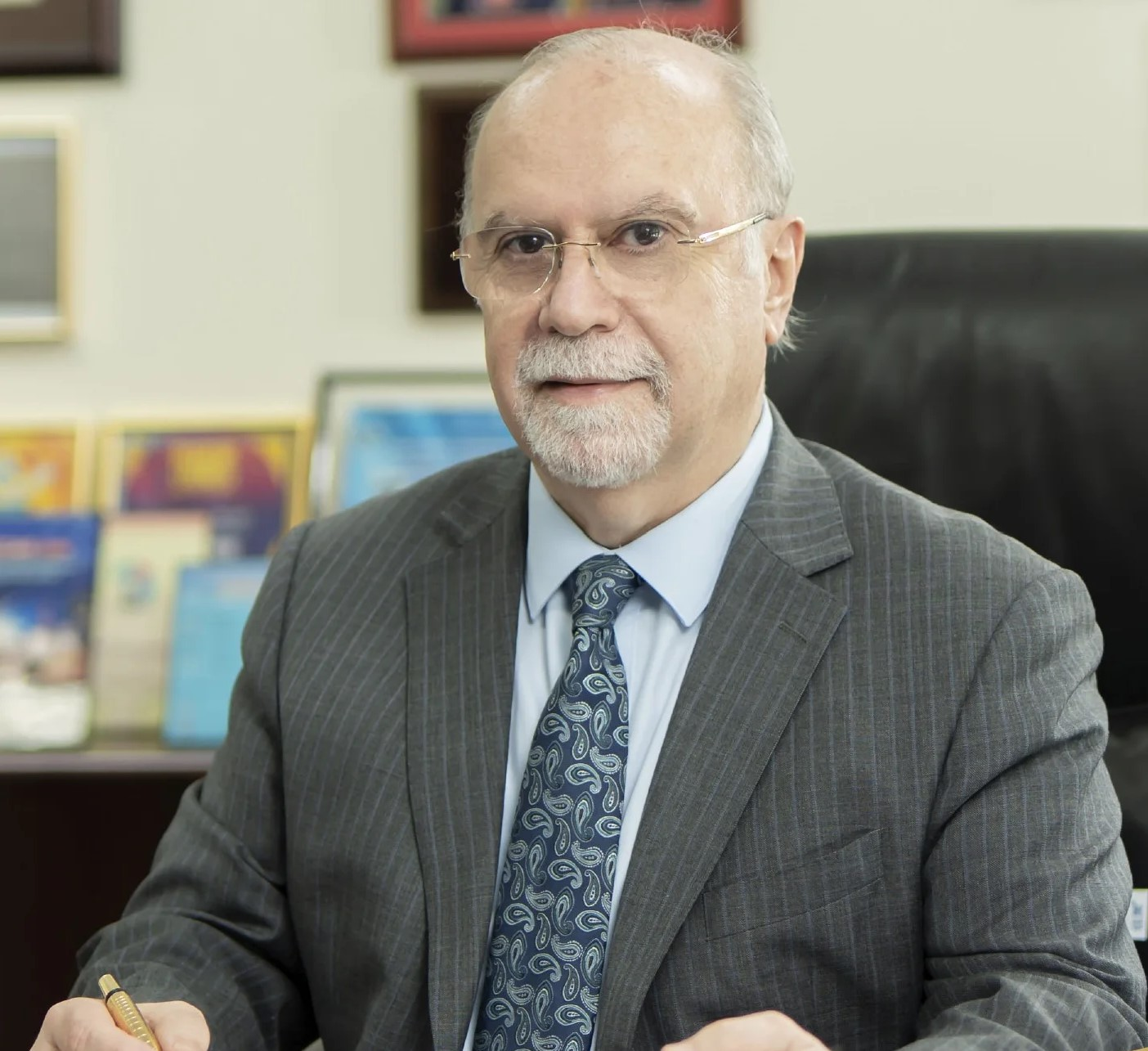
- Born: 30 April 1957 (age 69); São Jorge de Arroios, Lisbon, Portugal
- Education: Instituto Superior Técnico (BSc, MSc, PhD, Habilitation)
- Known for: Analog and mixed-signal VLSI design; academic leadership in Macao
- Awards: Medal of Professional Merit (Macao, 1999); Honorary Title of Value (Macao, 2001); Medal of Merit in Education (Macao, 2021); National Award for Electrical Engineering (Portugal, 2024); Chinese Government Friendship Award (China, 2025); Commander of the Order of Merit (Portugal, 2026)
- Honors: IEEE Life Fellow (2024); Member of the Lisbon Academy of Sciences (2010)
- Scientific career
- Fields: Electrical engineering, Microelectronics, VLSI design
- Workplaces: Instituto Superior Técnico; University of Macau

Rui Paulo da Silva Martins (born 30 April 1957) is a Portuguese electrical engineer known for his contributions to microelectronics research and higher education. He has been Vice Rector of the University of Macau since 1997 and holds a Chair Professorship in its Department of Electrical and Computer Engineering. Martins is a Life Fellow of the IEEE and a Permanent Member of the Lisbon Academy of Sciences. His work has earned more than 22,000 citations and his h‑index is 70 (July 2026).

== Education and early career ==
Martins was born in São Jorge de Arroios, Lisbon, and grew up in Mozambique, where he graduated from the Liceu Salazar (now Escola Secundária Josina Machel) in 1974. He earned his BSc (1980), MSc (1985), PhD (1992), and Habilitation to Full Professor (2001) in electrical and computer engineering from Instituto Superior Técnico (IST), University of Lisbon.

Martins joined the IST faculty in October 1980 and served until October 1992, when he took leave to join the University of Macau. He maintained that leave until his retirement from IST as Full Professor in August 2025.

== Academic and institutional leadership ==
At the University of Macau, Martins was Dean of the Faculty of Science and Technology (1994–1997). In 1997 he became the sole Vice Rector (Academic and Research), later serving as Vice Rector (Research) (2008–2018), and since 2018 as Vice Rector (Global Affairs), with his mandate extended to 2027. He was appointed Chair Professor of Electrical and Computer Engineering in 2013 and has served as Director of the Institute of Microelectronics since 2019.

== Research and mentorship ==
Martins established the Analog and Mixed-Signal VLSI Laboratory in 2003, elevated in 2011 to Macao's first State Key Laboratory in engineering. He led it until 2022. He has published over 1,250 works and filed more than 90 patents in the US, China, and Taiwan region.

At Macao, Martins introduced Master's and PhD programmes in ECE in 1993–94, supervised numerous theses, and oversaw the design of the first integrated circuit in Macao, UMCHIP, in 1994. In order to maintain the state-of-the-art world-level of microelectronics research of the University of Macau, the Institute of Microelectronics was established in 2019. Two of the first-ever master degree programmes in microelectronics have also been offered since Academic Year 2021/2022 in the University of Macau.

== Professional roles and honours ==
Martins became an IEEE Member in 1988, Senior Member in 1999, Fellow in 2008 "for leadership in engineering education", and Life Fellow in 2024. He founded the IEEE Macau Section (2003–2005) and the IEEE Macau Joint Chapter on Circuits and Systems/Communications (2005-2008), which won IEEE CAS Society's "World Chapter of the Year" award in 2009.

Martins has served as Vice President and President of the Association of Portuguese Speaking Universities (AULP), where he was granted Honorary Membership in 2021.

He has received honours from the Macao government, including the Medal of Professional Merit (1999), Honorary Title of Value (2001), and the Medal of Merit in Education (2021). In 2024, he received the inaugural National Award for Electrical Engineering from the Ordem dos Engenheiros. He was elected to the Lisbon Academy of Sciences as Correspondent Member in 2010 and Permanent Member in 2022.

On 30 September 2025, Martins received the Chinese Government Friendship Award at a ceremony held at the Great Hall of the People in Beijing. The Friendship Award is China's highest honour for foreign experts working in China, recognizing their exceptional contributions to advancing international exchange and cooperation between China and other countries.

On 11 February 2026, Martins was awarded the rank of Commander of the Order of Merit by Portuguese President Marcelo Rebelo de Sousa, in recognition of his long-standing efforts to promote cooperation between China and Portuguese-speaking countries, as well as his contributions to higher education and scientific research in Portugal and Macao.

== Selected research contributions ==
Under Martins' leadership, Macao's State Key Laboratory became a regular contributor to the IEEE International Solid-State Circuits Conference (ISSCC). Between 2011 and 2022, it presented 45 papers, with 15 accepted in 2023, making it the leading institution worldwide.

His group won the Takuo Sugano Award at ISSCC in 2017 and 2024 for contributions to power transceivers and ADC architectures.

Other research includes low-power wireless transceivers, compact amplifiers, CMOS Hall sensors, micro-NMR systems, and edge IoT smart metering solutions.

== Selected publications ==
- Chen Deng, Wenhua Gong, Yatao Peng, Jun Yin, Jing Wang, Jad Benserhir, Lin Cheng, Edoardo Charbon, Rui P. Martins, Pui-In Mak, “A Cryogenic HBT-CMOS Temperature Sensor Operating From 4 to 70 K”, IEEE Transactions on CAS – Part I: Regular Papers, vol.73, No.5, pp.3102-3115, May 2026 [Highlight of the Month in T-CASI].
- Yuanfei Wang, Zhiyuan Zhang, Ziyang Zhong, Yihan Zhang, R.P.Martins, Mo Huang, “An SC-first Hybrid SCVR with 4xCF Continuously Scalable-Conversion Ratio SC Achieving 92.5% Peak Efficiency”, Proc. IEEE Custom Integrated Circuits Conference – CICC 2025, Session 4, pp.1-3, Boston, Massachusetts, USA, April 2025 [Outstanding Regular Paper Award].
- Jiao Zhai, Yingying Li, Weiqin Ji, Xinru Huang, Ping Wang, Yunyi Li, Haoran Li, Ada Hang-Heng Wong, Xiong Zhou, Ping Chen, Lianhong Wang, Ning Yang, Chi Chen, Haitian Chen, Pui-In Mak, Chu-Xia Deng, Rui Martins, Mengsu Yang, Tsung-Yi Ho, Shuhong Yi, Hailong Yao, Yanwei Jia, “Drug screening on digital microfluidics for cancer precision medicine”, Nature Communications, 2024, 15:4363, pp.1-16, May 2024.
- Yuefeng Cao, Minglei Zhang, Yan Zhu, R.P. Martins, Chi-Hang Chan, “A 12GS/s 12b 4× Time-Interleaved Pipelined ADC with Comprehensive Calibration of TI Errors and Linearized Input Buffer”, Digest of Technical Papers from IEEE International Solid-State Circuits Conference – ISSCC 2024, pp.388-390, San Francisco, USA, February 2024 [“Takuo Sugano Award for Outstanding Far-East Paper”].
- R.P.Martins, Pui-In Mak, et al, “Analog and Mixed-Signal Circuits in Nanoscale CMOS”, Springer Nature, USA, January 2023.
- Mo Huang, Yan Lu, Seng-Pan U, R.P.Martins, “A Reconfigurable Bidirectional Wireless Power Transceiver with Maximum-Current Charging Mode and 58.6% Battery-to-Battery Efficiency”, Digest of Technical Papers from IEEE International Solid-State Circuits Conference – ISSCC 2017, vol.60, pp.376-377, San Francisco, USA, February 2017 [“Takuo Sugano Award for Outstanding Far-East Paper”].
- Jie Gao, Xianming Liu, Tianlan Chen, Pui-In Mak, Yuguang Du, Mang-I Vai, Bingcheng Lin, Rui P.Martins, “An intelligent digital microfluidic system with fuzzy-enhanced feedback for multi-droplet manipulation”, Lab on a Chip, Royal Society of Chemistry, vol.13, No.3, pp.443-451, February 2013.
- Yan Zhu, Chi-Hang Chan, U-Fat Chio, Sai-Weng Sin, Seng-Pan U, Rui Paulo Martins, Franco Maloberti, “A 10-bit 100-MS/s Reference-Free SAR ADC in 90 nm CMOS”, IEEE Journal of Solid-State Circuits, vol.45, No.6, pp.1111-1121, June 2010. [“Most cited journal paper in the SKLAB – 826 Google Scholar citations and the 2^{nd} Most cited SAR ADC paper in IEEEXplore with 680 paper citations and 10 patent citations among 2,000+ papers”].
- Seng-Pan U, R.P.Martins, J.E.Franca, “A 2.5V 57MHz 15-Tap SC Bandpass Interpolating Filter with 320MHz Output Sampling Rate in 0.35μm CMOS”, Digest of Technical Papers from IEEE International Solid-State Circuits Conference – ISSCC 2002, vol. 45 / No.1, pp.380-381 (& 475) & Visuals Supplement, vol. 45 / No.2, pp.306-307 (& 518-519), San Francisco, USA, February 2002.
- R.P.Martins, José E.Franca, Franco Maloberti, “An Optimum CMOS Switched-Capacitor Antialiasing Decimating Filter”, IEEE Journal of Solid-State Circuits, vol.28, No.9, pp.962-970, September 1993.

== See also ==
- Instituto Superior Técnico
- University of Macau
- Lisbon Academy of Sciences
- IEEE
