= Bemposta Palace =

Palace in Lisbon

Palace of Bemposta
- Palácio da Bemposta
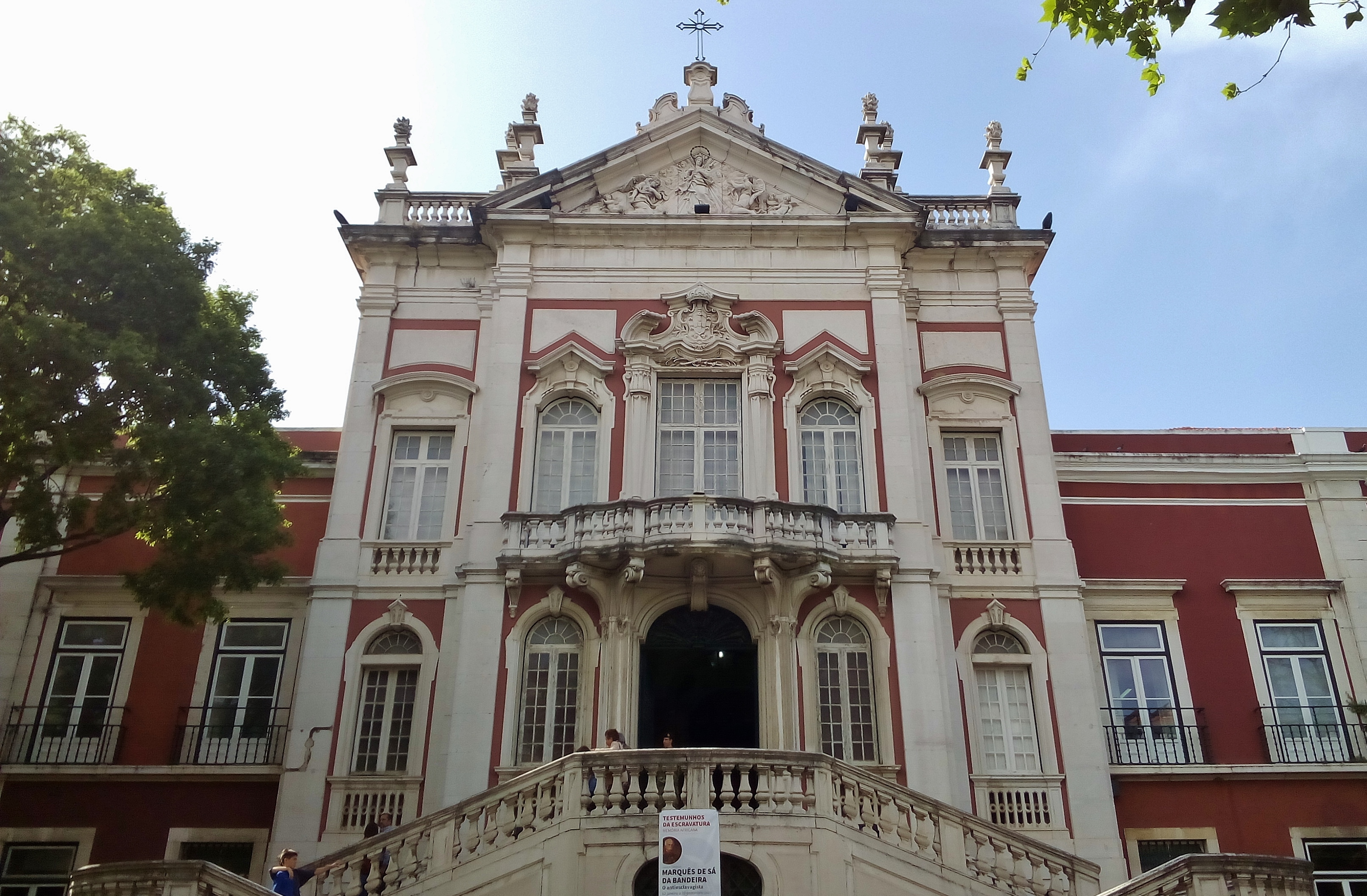

- Location within Lisbon

General information
- Type: Palace
- Architectural style: Neoclassical
- Location: Pena, Portugal
- Coordinates: 38°43′24.58″N 9°8′17.46″W
- Opened: c. 1693
- Owner: Portuguese Republic

Technical details
- Material: Marble

Design and construction
- Architect: João Antunes

The Bemposta Palace (Palácio da Bemposta), also known as the Paço da Rainha (Queen's Palace), is a neoclassical palace in the area of Bemposta, now the civil parish of Pena, in Lisbon. It was originally built for Queen Dowager Catherine of Braganza on her return from London to Lisbon and served for several years as her residence. It was then transferred to the Casa do Infantado (the property of the younger son of the King of Portugal), before becoming the residence of John VI of Portugal until his death. After Queen Maria II of Portugal transferred its title to the Army, it became the Portuguese Military Academy.

== History ==
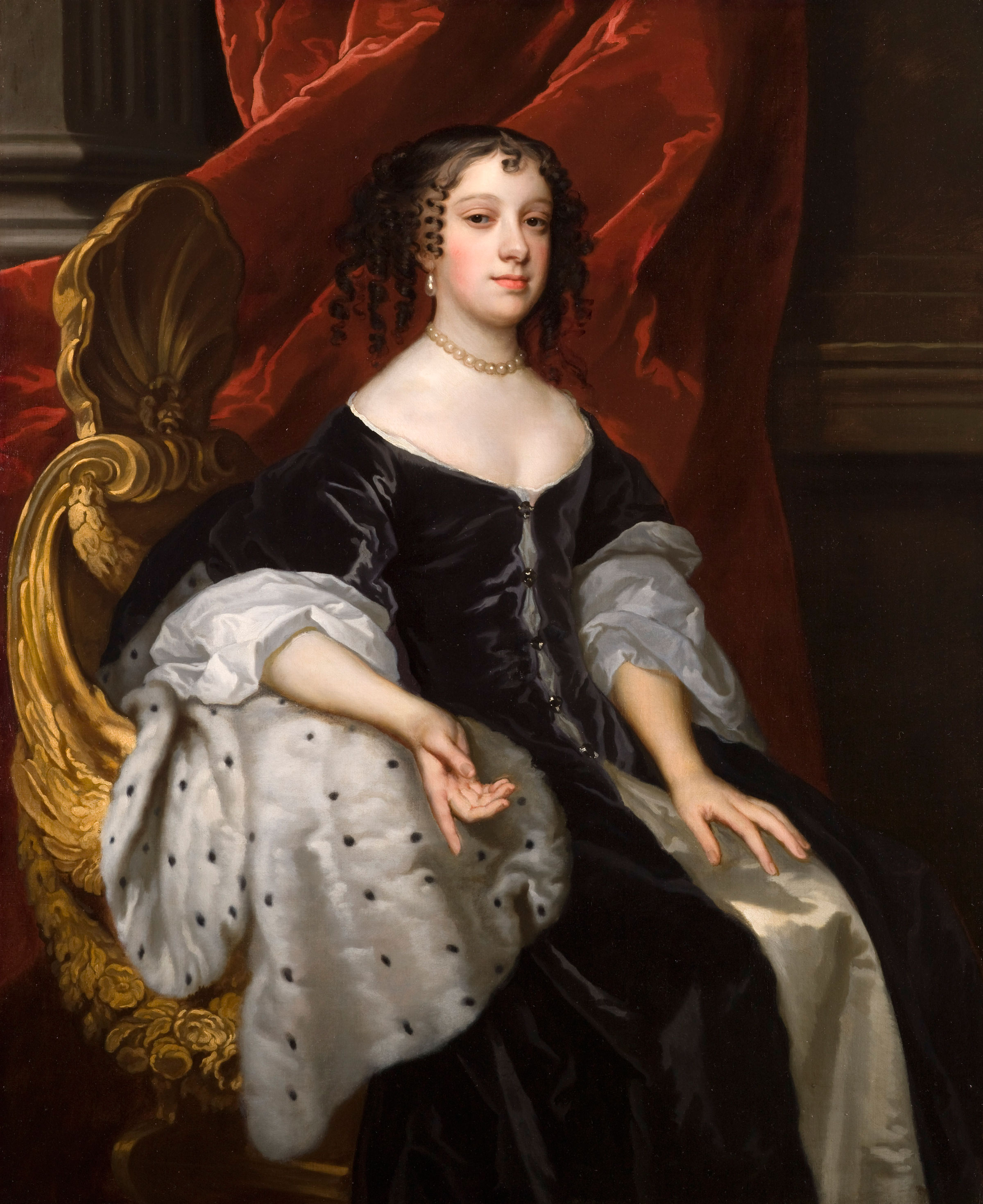
Queen Catherine of Braganza, widow of King Charles II of England, ordered Bemposta Palace be built.

Eight years after the death of Charles II of England (in 1685), who left no legitimate son as heir to the throne, Queen Catherine of Braganza, daughter of John IV, returned to Portugal in 1693. Without a home in Lisbon, she resided in the homes of various noblemen for a time, including the Count of Redondo in Santa Maria or the palace of the Count of Aveiras, in Belém. She decided to purchase from Francisca Pereira Teles, the noble homes and land in Bemposta area in the centre of Lisbon, in order to build her residence. A chapel dating back to 1501 existed there and she requested the architect, João Antunes (1642–1712), to incorporate a chapel in the site plan under the invocation of Nossa Senhora da Conceição (Our Lady of the Conception). The project began in 1694, with Antunes coming on board in 1702, and by 1702 the Queen had already begun to live in the palace. The building was a mixed construction: limestone and marble was used in many of the flourishes, but the structure was built of reinforced steel, wood and masonry.

Catherine died here on 31 December 1705, leaving in her will the Palace of Bemposta to her brother, King Peter II of Portugal, who in 1668 had become regent on behalf of his mentally unstable elder brother Afonso VI of Portugal and king in 1683. On 29 October 1706 a royal chapel was constructed.

In 1707, King John V, made the house and lands part of the House of the Infantado, so that it became the residence of the Portuguese monarchy's Infantes and Infantas of the realm, such as Infante Francis, Duke of Beja, King John V's brother and Lord of the Infantado, and his son João da Bemposta, named so for having resided in the palace.

After the 1755 Lisbon earthquake, the palace required extensive reconstruction, including the royal chapel, which was completely destroyed. Under the direction of Manuel Caetano de Sousa (1742–1802), the building was remodeled and an elaborate chapel was constructed, with a rectangular vestibule and nave and polychromatic mosaics. A portrait of the royal family was commissioned for the main altar, Maria I and Infante John with the court, in an iconographic representation of Lisbon, seen from the Castle of São Jorge. The success of the chapel, came from the contribution of the woodworkers from the Church of São Roque (and in particular the Chapel of São João Baptista). A similar design esthetic was also brought in from the Royal Chapel in the Palace of Queluz. The Bemposta Palace had its own singers (since 1759) that incorporated an organist and singers, that were contracted and regularly performed in Lisbon. But, the organ had already been spirited away to the Palace of Queluz by 1778.

The palace too began to be abandoned, as the royals move to other preferred lodgings: by 1798 the palace was already abandoned and falling into ruin.

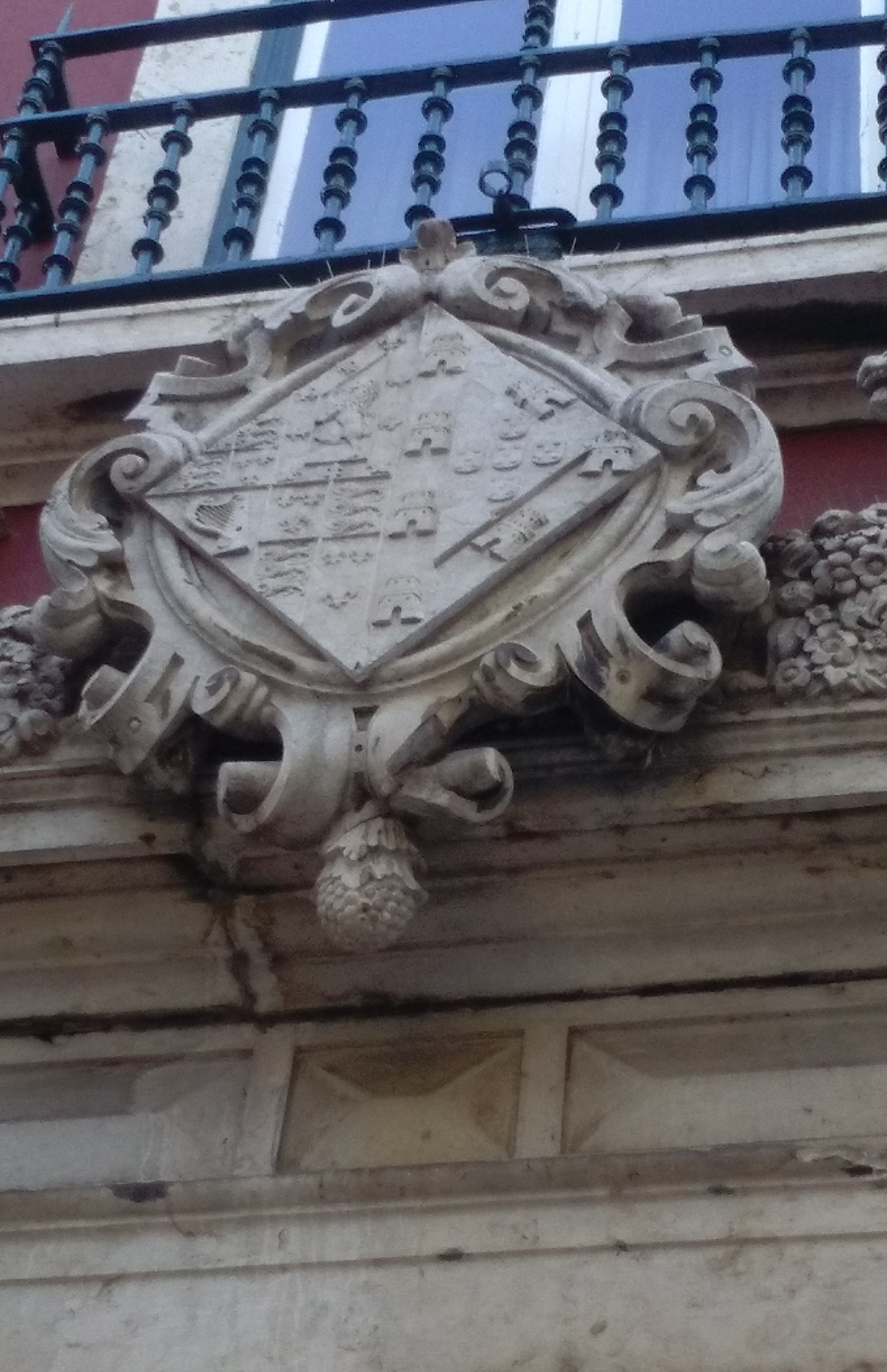
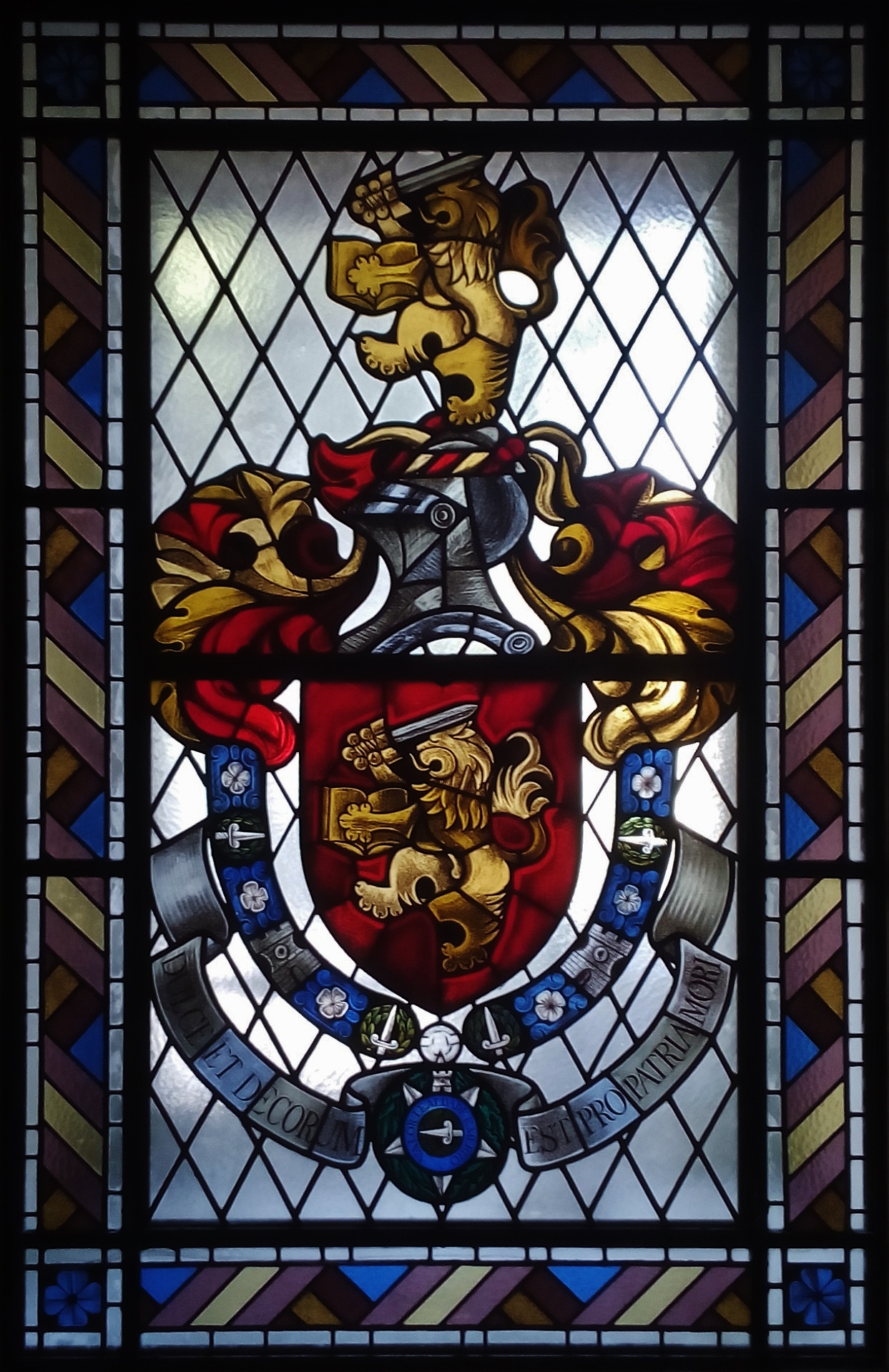
Coat of arms of Queen Catherine of Braganza (left) and the Military Academy (right).

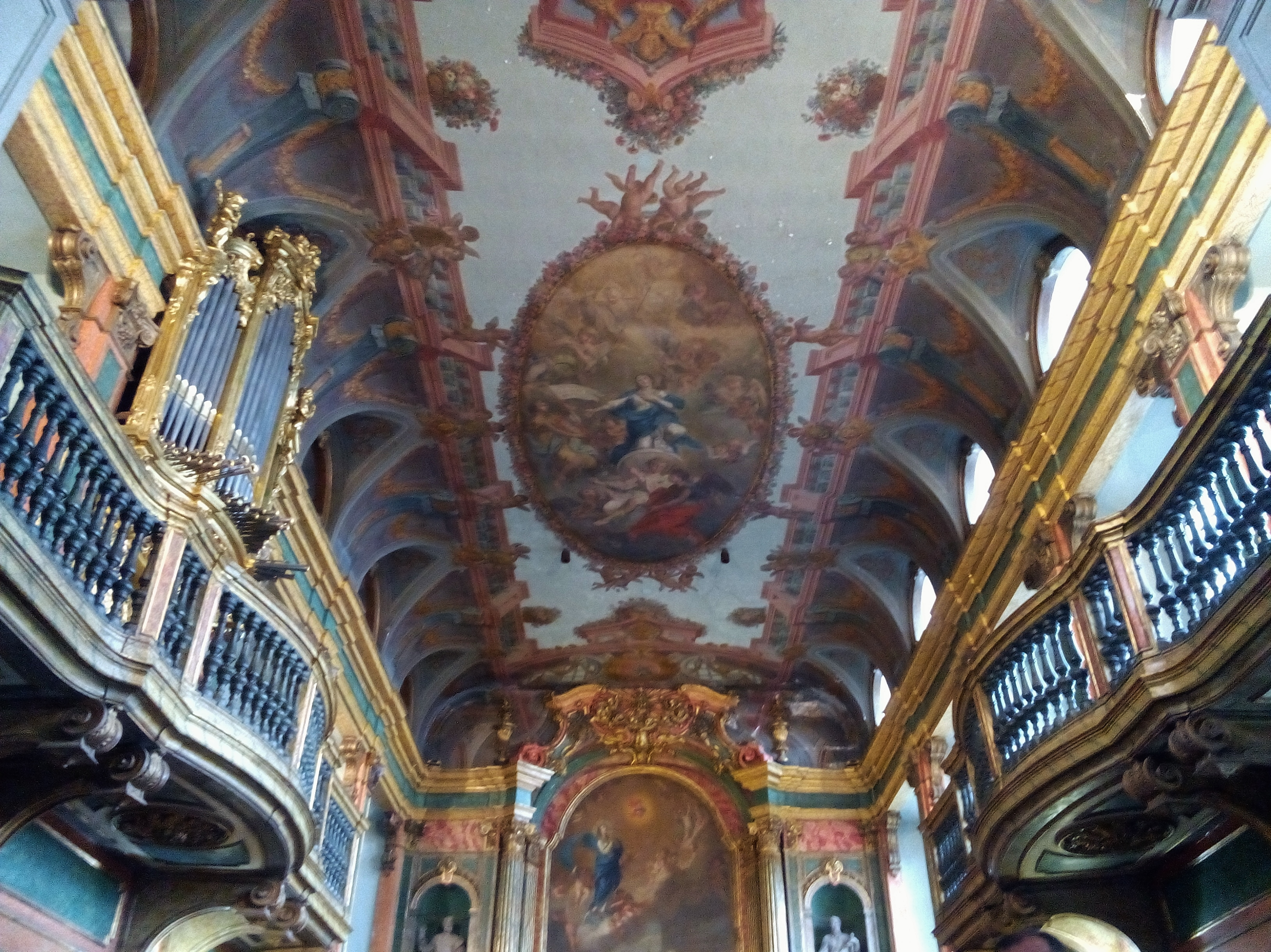
The palace chapel, designed by José Troni and Thomas F. Hickey.

In 1803, the Prince-Regent, (the future King John VI) lived at Bemposta. Even after the return of the royal family, in 1821, John returned to Bemposta, and with the intent of making the residence more habitable, began various renovations in 1822, 1824 and 1825, principally in the rooms behind the chapel and on the floor near the gardens. At Bemposta the politics of King John VI's reign played-out: including the events of the insurrections known as the Vilafrancada and Abrilada, and his eventual death (he died in his personal quarters, on 10 March 1826).

In 1828, King Miguel began holding weekly audiences in the palace.

The designation as Casa do Infantado was removed in 1833, and the palace was incorporated into the Crown's property. Until 18 March 1834, a formal political administration occupied the Bemposta Palace, but it was vacated and returned to Crown estates under Queen Maria II. Yet, the Queen later transferred the palace to the Army in 1837, where, after 1851, it began to function as an Army Academy (after extensive remodelling in 1850–1851), where, under General Bernardo de Sá Nogueira de Figueiredo, 1st Marquess of Sá da Bandeira, the building was expanded and interior remodelled. In 1853, the chapel, until this time a private hermitage, began to be open to the faith community. With changes in the urban planning in Lisbon, the area in front of the palace became reduced, and traffic along the avenue resulted in the shortening of the main outside staircase in 1860 (with the widening of the road).

In 1944, there was a complete restoration of the chapel, followed in 1997 by a renovation of the electrical and fire prevention systems in order to meet safety standards.

On 13 September 1999, an analysis of the architectural state was begun by the General-Directorate for Buildings and National Monuments. The palace houses the Portuguese Military Academy, and the coat-of-arms of Queen Catherine are still visible above the principal doors of the building.

In 2001, a monument to Queen Catherine was installed in front of the buildings façade.

== Architecture ==
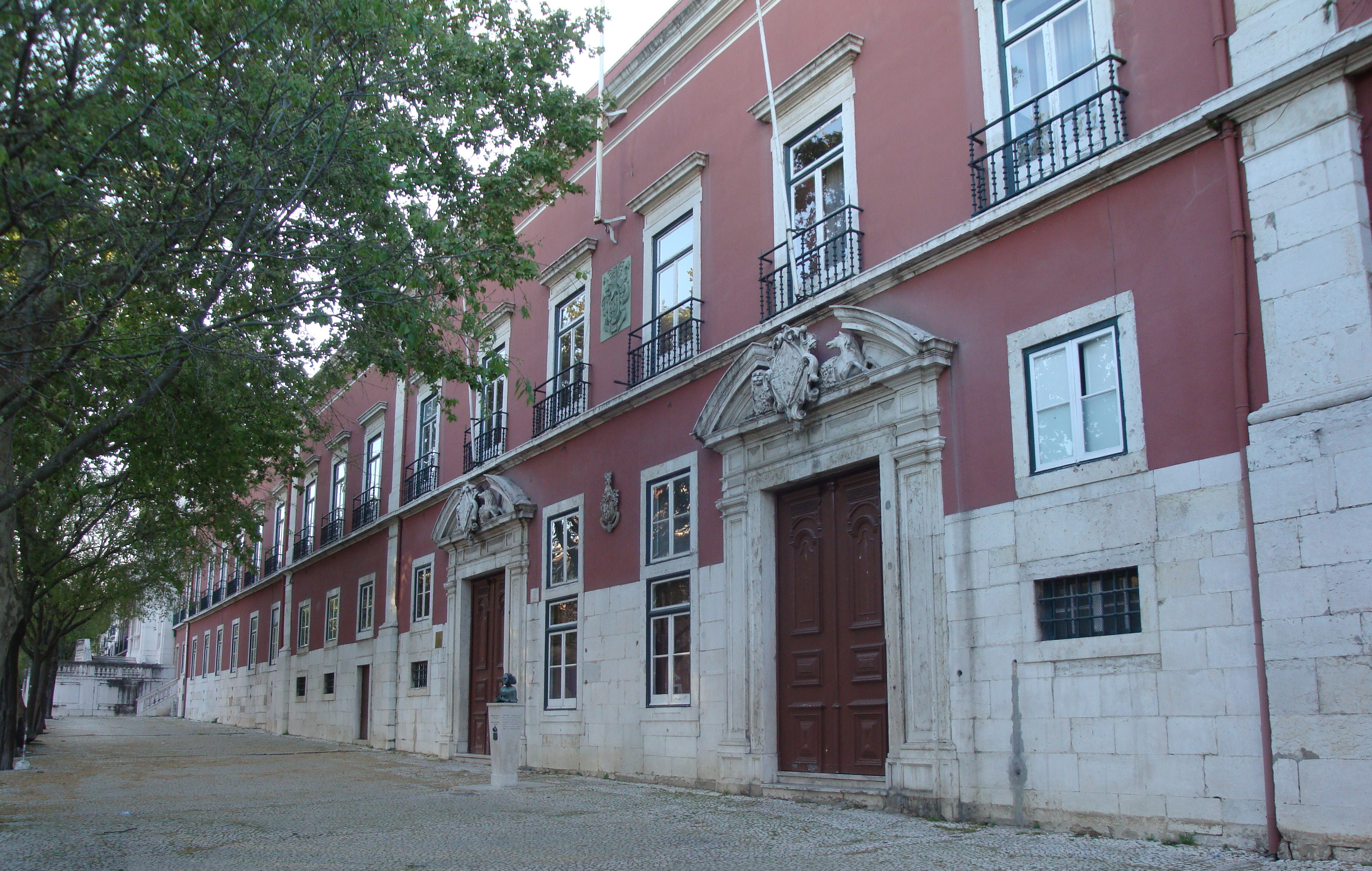
East wing of the palace.

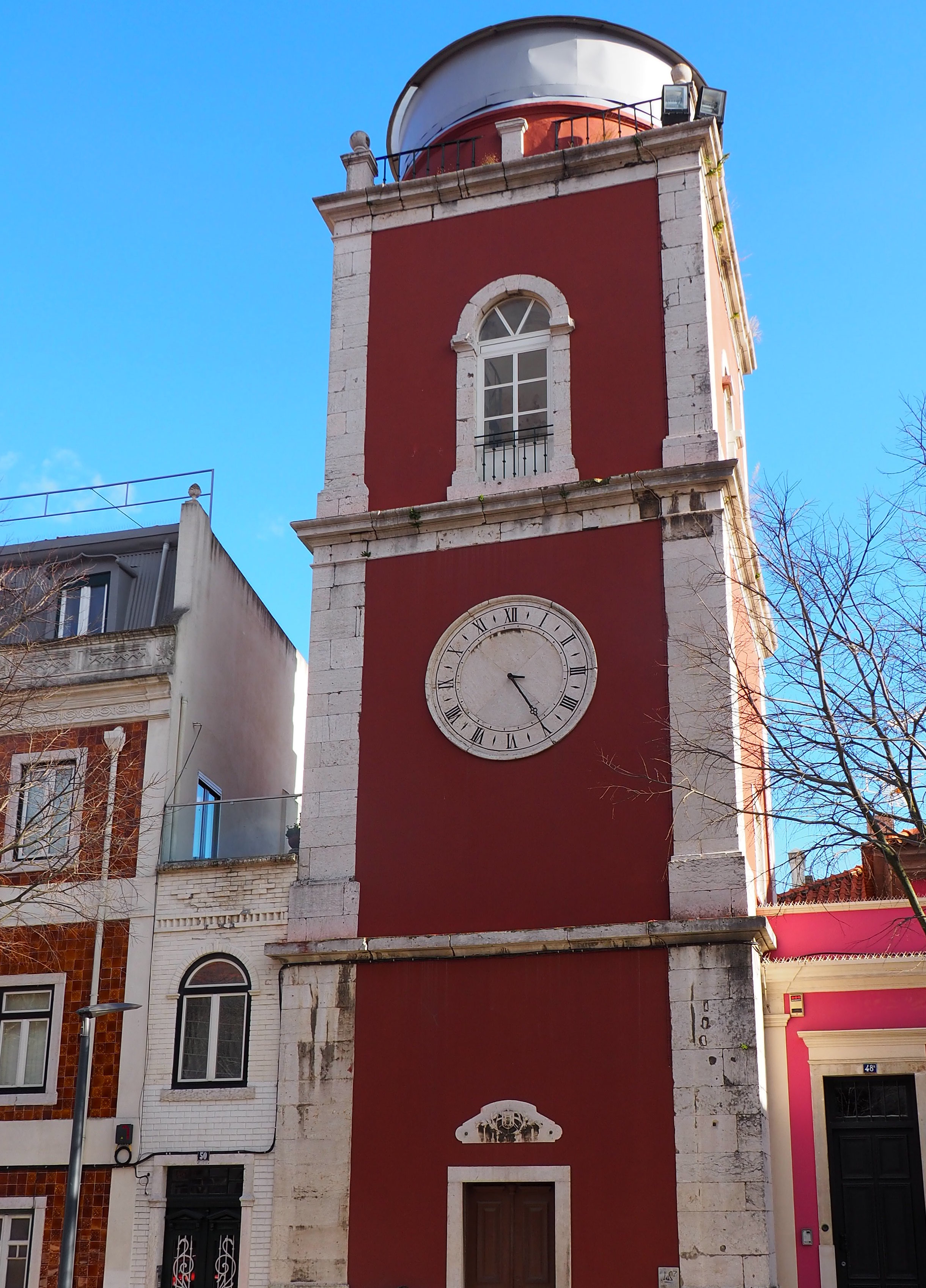
Palace clock tower.

The Palace of Bemposta is located in the Largo do Paço da Rainha on the eastern border of Pena with Anjos. The principal building, used by the military academy, fronts the Largo (square) across from the clock-tower and Mitelo Palace, in proximity of the Quartel do Cabeço da Bola, Jardim do Campo Mártires da Pátria (Garden of Campo Mártires da Pátria) and Miguel Bombarda Hospital.

The front façade includes two staircases that ribbon towards the main floor and veranda with balusters. The main arched doorway are flanked by two sets of tall windows, while a secondary floor veranda with main window is also flanked by two other sets (the central window, which is much taller than the others, is surmounted by sculpted coat-of-arms of the royal family. This façade is completed by a triangular wall adorned by the relief of two seraphs adoring the Virgin Mary (by the sculptor Joaquim de Barros Laborão, surmounted by a cross above a plinth. In the chapel's atrium there are two niches with statutes of Elizabeth of Portugal and John the Baptist (begun by José de Almeida and completed by Barros Laborão).

=== Chapel ===
In the main chapel, there is a figure of the patron saint by the painter Giuseppe Troni, with pictures of the royal family in the foreground (including Maria I, John VI and Carlota Joaquina) completed by the English painter Thomas F. Hickey. On the ceiling of the chapel, in an ovular mould, there is a painting of the Virgin attributed to Pedro Alexandrino de Carvalho (1730–810). Along the lateral walls are pulpits delimited by balusters, while on the left side the organ. The lateral altars, with the exception of the second epistle, are marked by the acronym of Pedro Alexandrino. On the roof, in the middle of a complex Baroque scene is a painting by Pedro Alexandrino representing the Assumption of Mary, encircled by a crown of cherubs and four doctors of the church: Saint Augustine, Saint Ambrose, Saint Gregory Magno and Saint Jerome, while the painter also complete a painting of the Transfiguration on the roof of the chapel. The sacristy, with access on the left-side of the main altar, is covered in polychromatic azulejos, with a credence table made from Brazilwood.

== Bibliography ==
- Rev. Dr. Isley (1853). The Lisbon Guide, or an Historical and Descriptive View of the City of Lisbon and its Environs (2nd ed.). António Joaquim de Paula.
- Dottori, Mauricio (2008). The Church Music of Davide Perez and Niccolò Jommelli. Curitiba: DeArtes-UFPR. ISBN 978-85-98826-19-6.
- Abreu, João Manuel P. de A. (1943), Notícia Histórica da Capela da Bemposta (in Portuguese), Lisbon, Portugal
- Almeida, Fernando de (1975), Monumentos e Edifícios Notáveis do Distrito de Lisboa (in Portuguese), vol. 2, Lisbon, Portugal
- Araújo, Norberto de (1946), Inventário de Lisboa (in Portuguese), Lisbon, Portugal
- Leal, Augusto S.; Pinho, A. B. (1890) [1873], Portugal Antigo e Moderno (in Portuguese), vol. 2, Lisbon, Portugal
- Moita, Luis (October 1947), "A Bemposta (O Paço da Rainha)", Olisipo (in Portuguese), Ano X (40)
- Moita, Luis (October 1951), "A Bemposta (O Paço da Rainha)", Olisipo (in Portuguese), Ano XIV (56)
- Moita, Luis (January 1952), "A Bemposta (O Paço da Rainha)", Olisipo (in Portuguese), Ano XV (57)
- Moita, Luis (September 1952), "A Bemposta (O Paço da Rainha)", Olisipo (in Portuguese), Ano XV (60)
- Moita, Luis (January 1953), "A Bemposta (O Paço da Rainha)", Olisipo (in Portuguese), Ano XV (61)
- Moita, Luis (October 1953), "A Bemposta (O Paço da Rainha)", Olisipo (in Portuguese), Ano XVI (64)
- Moita, Luis (January 1954), "A Bemposta (O Paço da Rainha)", Olisipo (in Portuguese), Ano XVII (65)
- Pedreirinho, José Manuel (1994), Dicionário de arquitectos activos em Portugal do Séc. I à actualidade (in Portuguese), Porto, Portugal: Edições Afrontamento
- Sena, Camilo (1922), A Escola Militar de Lisboa (in Portuguese), Lisbon, Portugal
- Valença, Manuel (1990), A Arte Organística em Portugal (in Portuguese), vol. 1, Braga, Portugal
- Viterbo, Sousa (1904), Diccionario Historico e Documental dos Architectos, Engenheiros e Construtores Portuguezes ou a serviço de Portugal (in Portuguese), vol. 1, Lisbon, Portugal: Imprensa Nacional
