= Military Academy (Portugal) =

- Academia Militar
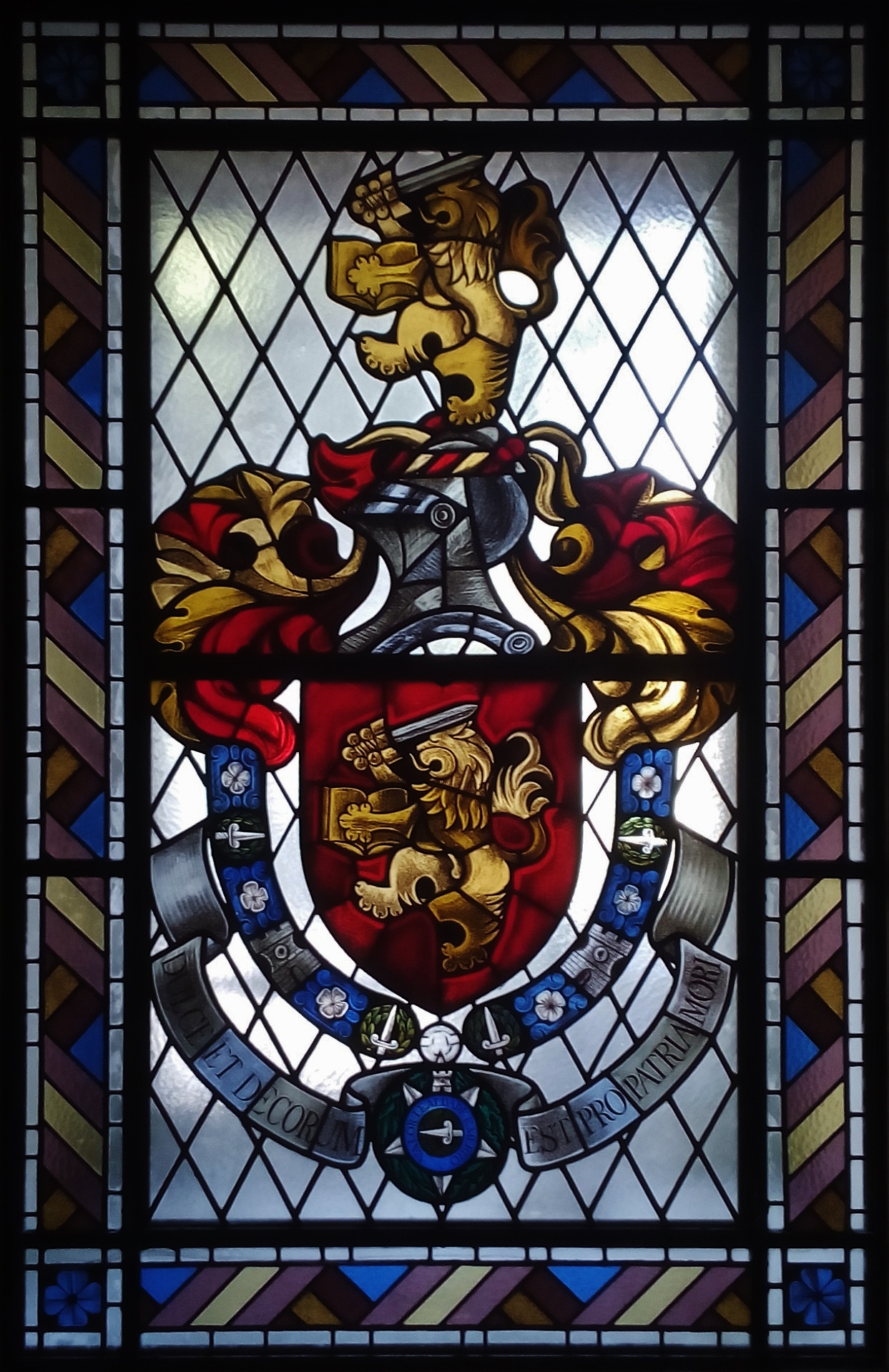
- Motto: Dulce et decorum est pro Patria mori
- Motto in English: It is sweet and honorable to die for the Fatherland
- Type: Military academy
- Established: 1640 - Artillery and Drawing School; 1790 - Royal Academy of Fortification, Artillhery and Drawing; 1837 - School of the Army; 1959 - Military Academy
- Commander: Major-general António José Pacheco Dias Coimbra
- Academic staff: 123
- Students: 740
- Postgraduates: yes, list follows
- Location: Lisbon and Amadora, District of Lisbon, Portugal; 38°43′23″N 9°8′19″W
- Campus: Palace of Bemposta
- Website: Military Academy

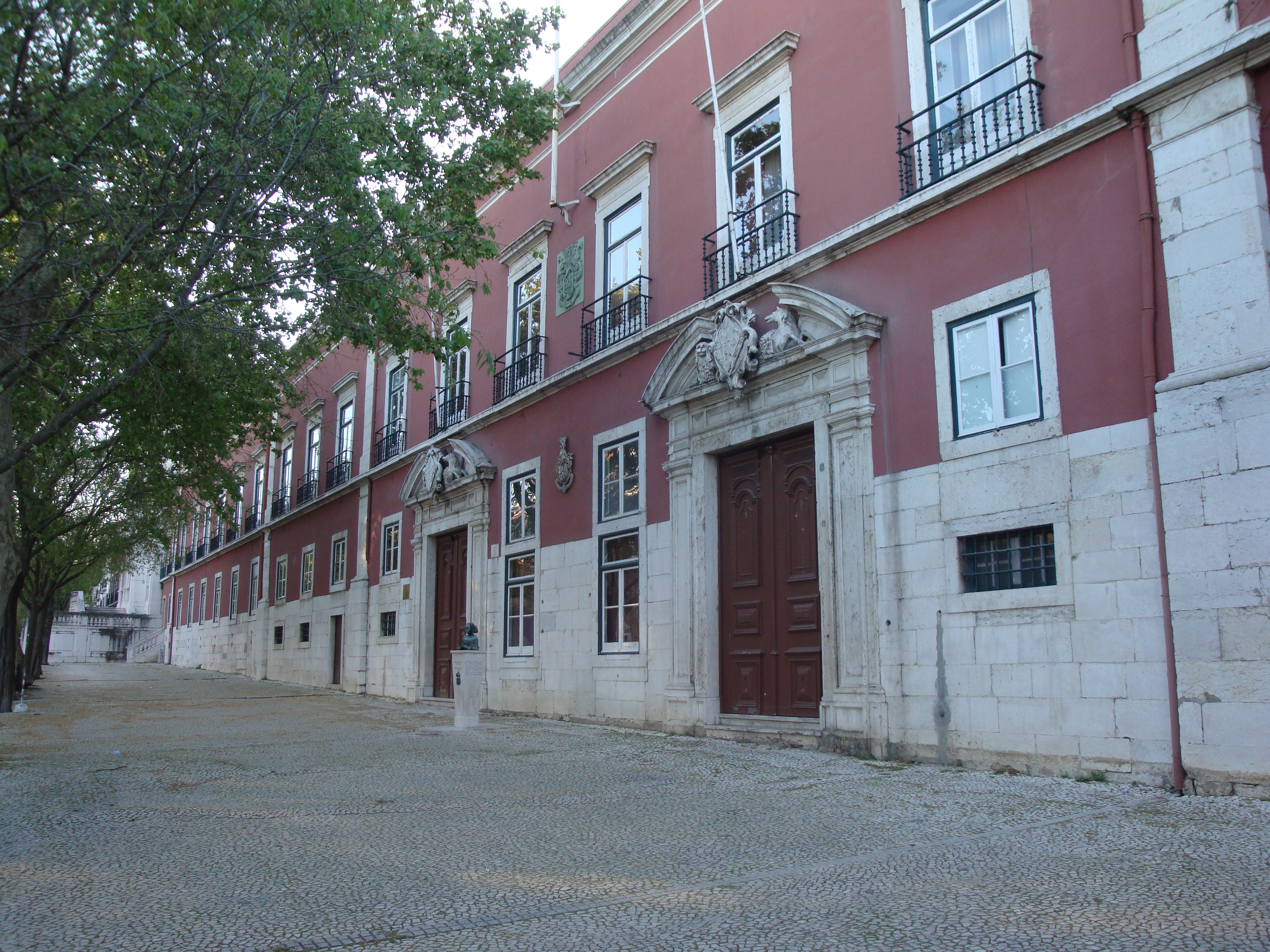
Bemposta Palace

The Military Academy (AM; Academia Militar in Portuguese) is a Portuguese military establishment, which has the ability to confer educational qualifications equivalent to a university. It develops activities of teaching, research and support for the communities with the purpose of training and forming officers for the Portuguese Army and the Republican National Guard.

== History ==
The Military Academy has this designation since 1959, but the first such establishment occurred in 1640 when the Military Higher Education was created.

== Campus ==
Currently, the Portuguese Military Academy is located in two different barracks, a main one in Lisbon's Bemposta Palace and a detachment in Amadora.

== Academics ==
=== Army graduation programs ===
- Master in military sciences, Cavalry (5 years)
- Master in military sciences, Infantry (5 years)
- Master in military sciences, Artillery (5 years)
- Master in military sciences, Military administration (5 years)
- Master in military engineering, Engineering (7 years)
- Master in military electrical engineering, Communications (7 years)
- Master in military electrical engineering, Materiel (7 years)
- Master in military mechanical engineering, Materiel (7 years)
- Master in military health, Medicine (7 years)
- Master in military health, Veterinary medicine (7 years)
- Master in military health, Pharmacological sciences (7 years)

=== National Republican Guard graduation programs ===
- Master in military sciences, Arms for the National Republican Guard (5 years)
- Master in military sciences, Administration for National Republican Guard (5 years)
- Master in military engineering, Engineering for National Republican Guard (7 years)
- Master in military health, Medicine for the National Republican Guard (7 years)
- Master in military health, Veterinary medicine for the National Republican Guard (7 years)

== Gallery ==
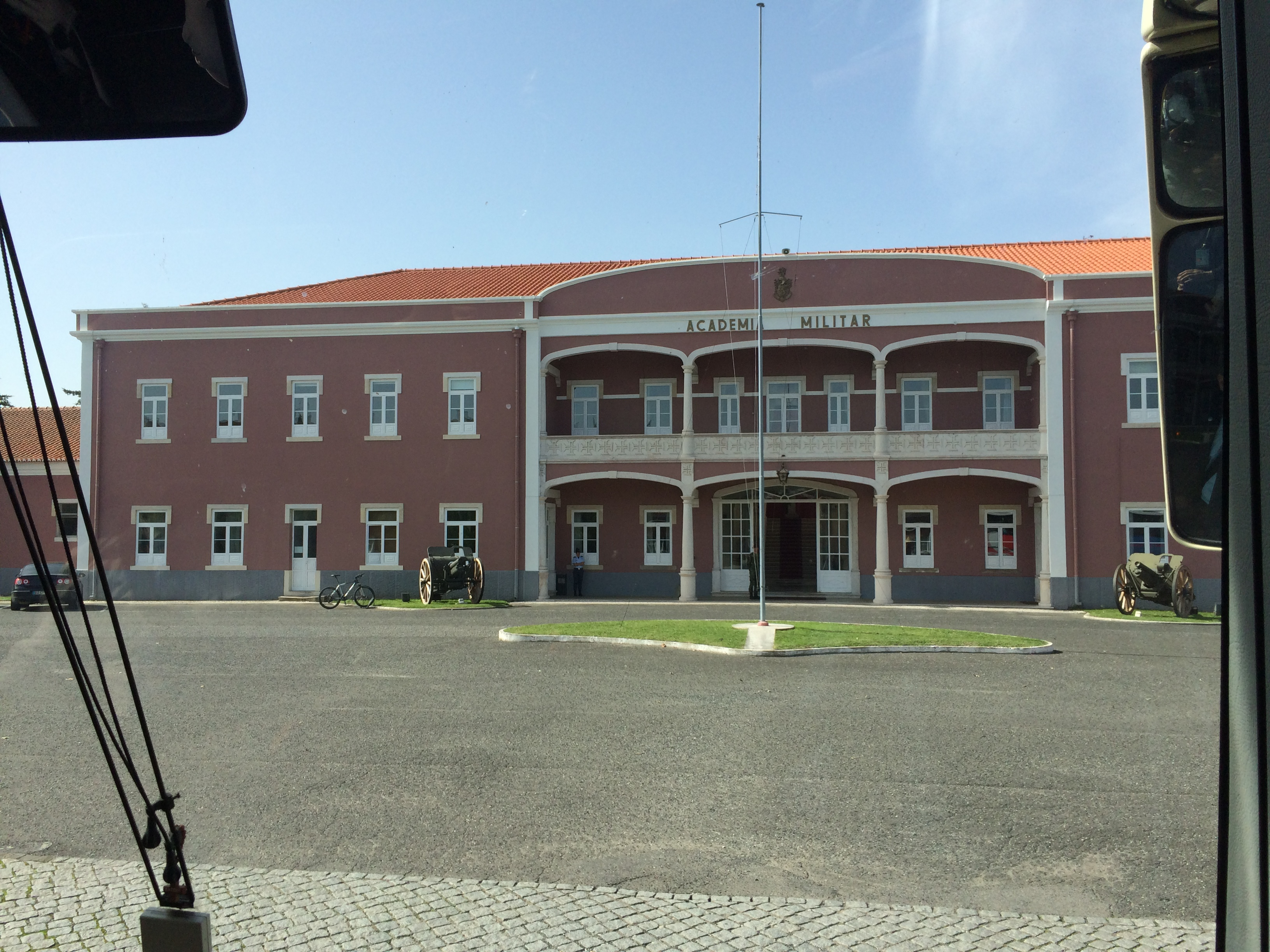
Military Academy (Portugal) in Amadora, Lisbon

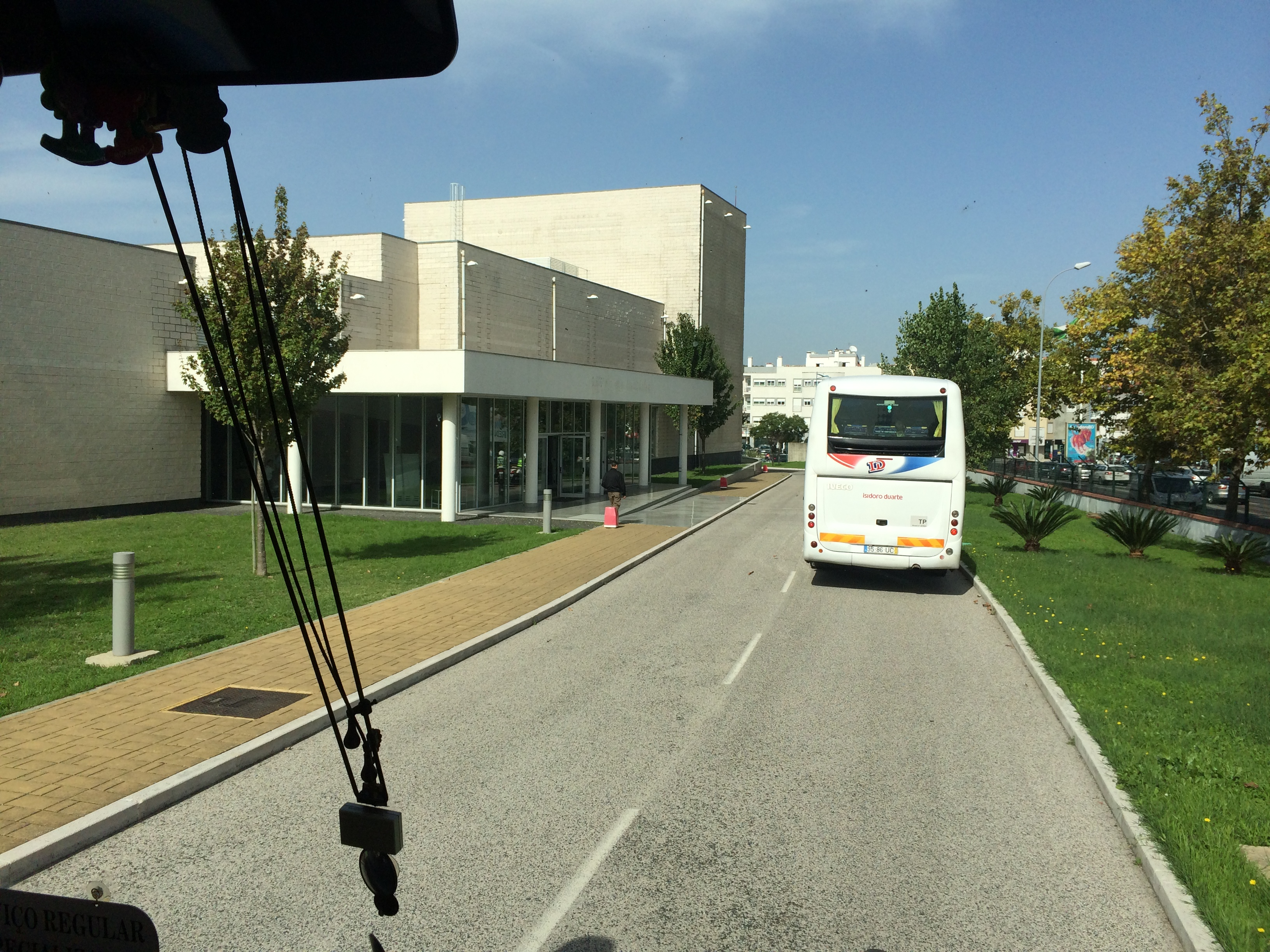
Conference Hall Building of Military Academy (Portugal) in Amadora, Lisbon

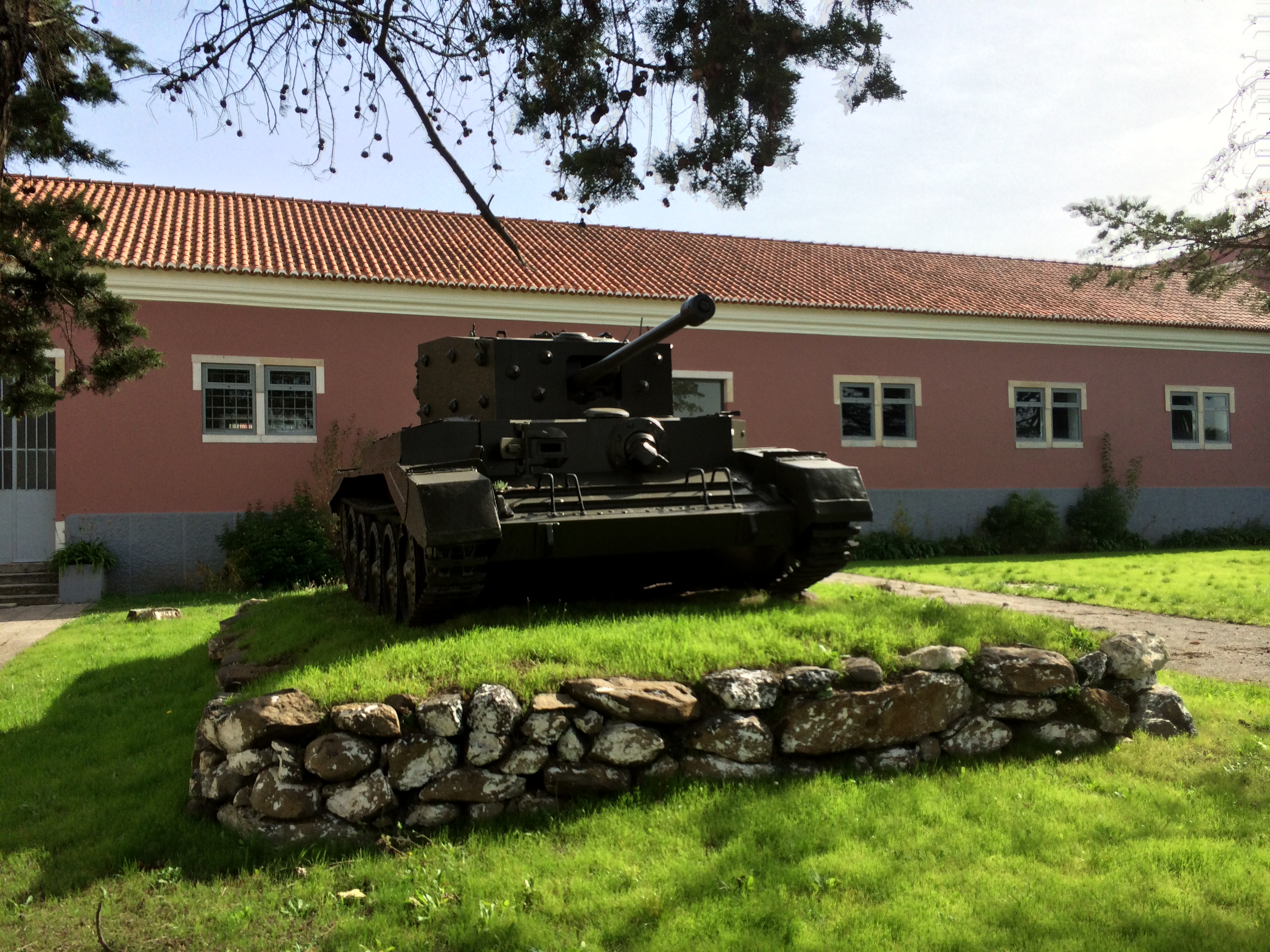
Military Academy (Portugal) in Amadora, Lisbon

== See also ==
- Higher education in Portugal
- National Republican Guard
- Portugal
