= Pena, Lisbon =

Pena
- Civil Parish
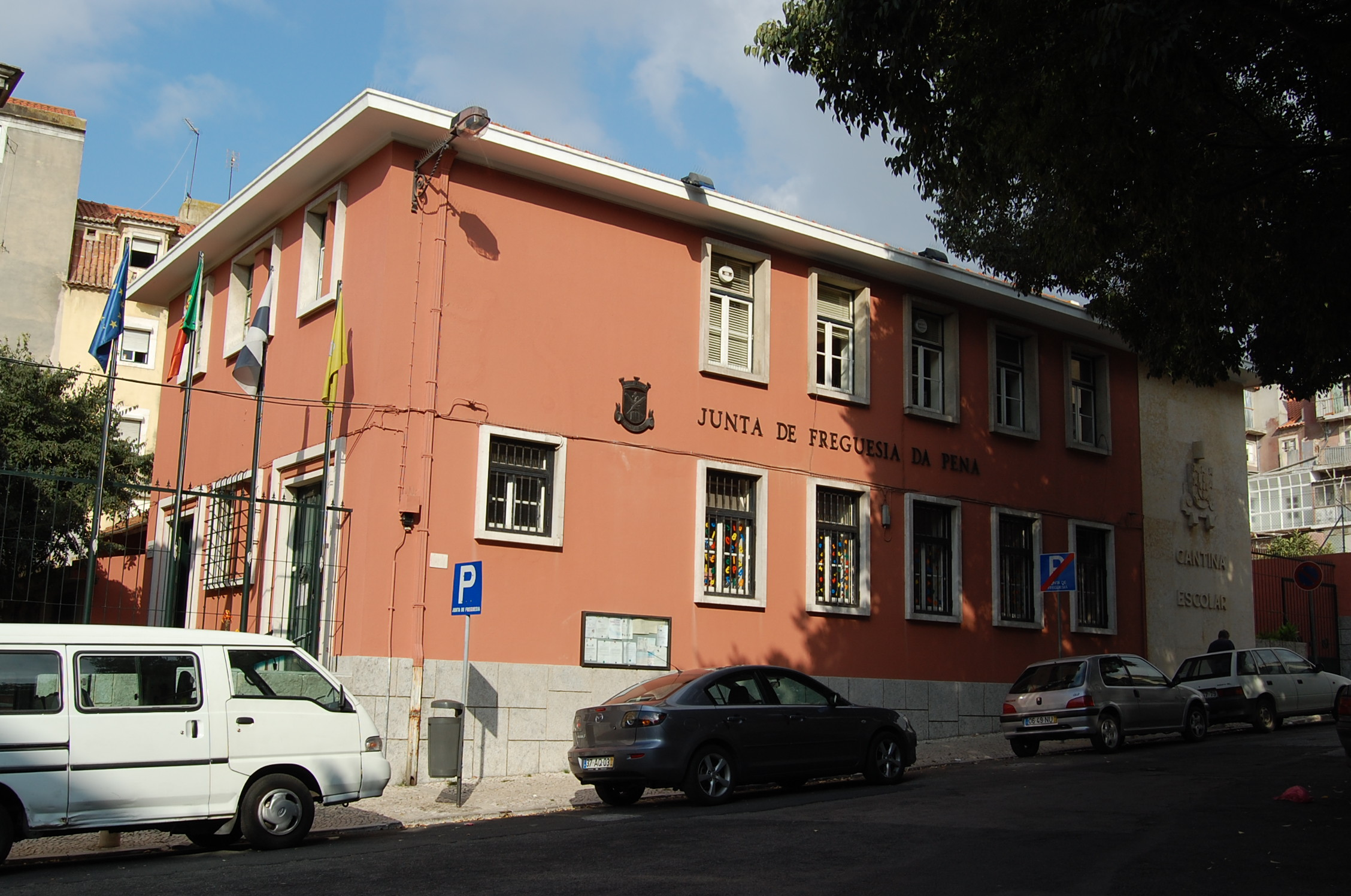
- The Junta Freguesia of Pena, the modern adoption of the parish authority

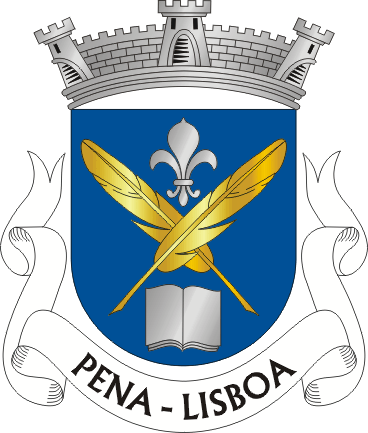
- Coat of arms
- Etymology: pena, Portuguese for help or aid
- Interactive map of Pena
- Coordinates: 38°43′16.91″N 9°8′23.60″W
- Country: Portugal
- Region: Lisbon
- Sub-region: Greater Lisbon
- District: Lisbon
- Municipality: Lisbon
- Settlement: fl. 1500
- Parish: c. 1564
- Civil Parish: c. 1705

Government
  - Type: LAU
  - Body: Freguesia/Junta Freguesia
  - Mayor: Joaquim Lopes Ramos

Area
  - Total: 0.50 km^{2} (0.19 sq mi)
- Elevation: 59 m (194 ft)

Population (2001)
  - Total: 6,068
  - Density: 12,000/km^{2} (31,000/sq mi)
- Time zone: UTC0 (WET)
  - Summer (DST): UTC+1 (WEST)
- Postal Zone: 1150-283 Pena
- Area code: (+351) 218 XXX XXX
- Demonym: Lisboense; Lisboetas
- Parish Address: Rua Saco, 1A; 1150-283 Pena
- Website: http://www.jf-pena.pt/
- Geographic detail from CAOP (2010) produced by Instituto Geográfico Português (IGP)

Pena is a former parish (freguesia) in the municipality of Lisbon, Portugal. At the administrative reorganization of Lisbon on 8 December 2012 it became part of the parish Arroios. In 2001, the population of the district included 6038 residents, in an area of 0.5 km^{2}, representing a highly compact population.

== History ==
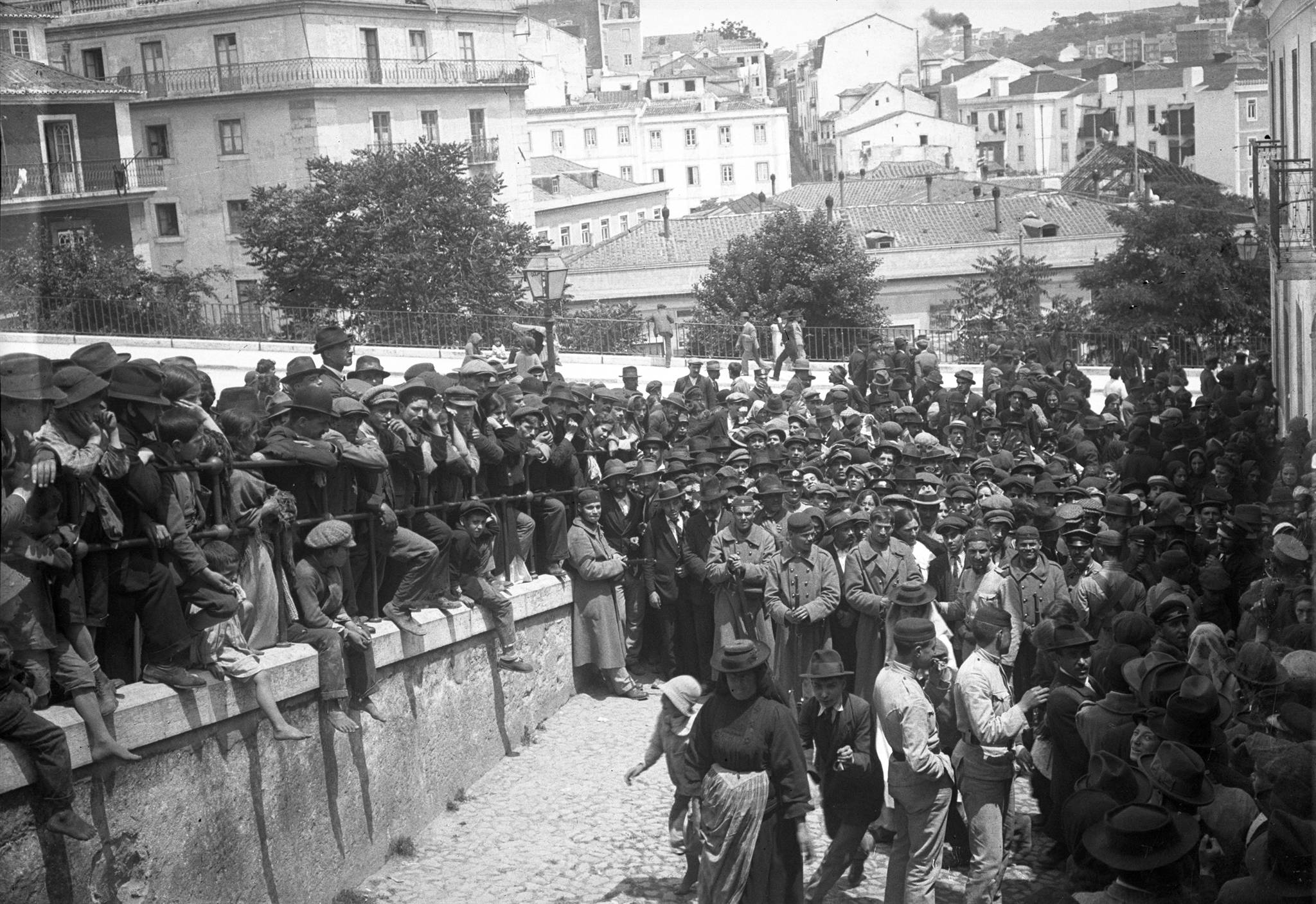
A scene from Pena (1910) after the death of Republican politician Dr. Miguel Bombarda

It was created in 1564, and designated Sant'Ana by Cardinal Henry, King of Portugal, when the parish of Santa Justa was divided.

Initially, the parish authority was localized in the Monastery of Sant'Ana (founded in 1561), but transferred to a building constructed by the brothers of the Santo Sacramento (after 25 March 1705): the Church of Nossa Senhora da Pena, along the Calçada da Pena, when the parish name changed to Nossa Senhora da Penha.

But, the 1755 Lisbon earthquake caused significant damage, and it was renovated by the middle of the 18th century, with recuperation completed in both the 18th and 19th centuries. Until 1763, the parish authority occupied several buildings, including a hermitage along the Travessa do Hospital, then at the Church of Nossa Senhora da Encarnação e Carmo, along the Travessa das Recolhidas, and later to the chapel in the Palace of Mitelo (in the Largo do Palácio do Mitelo).

== Geography ==
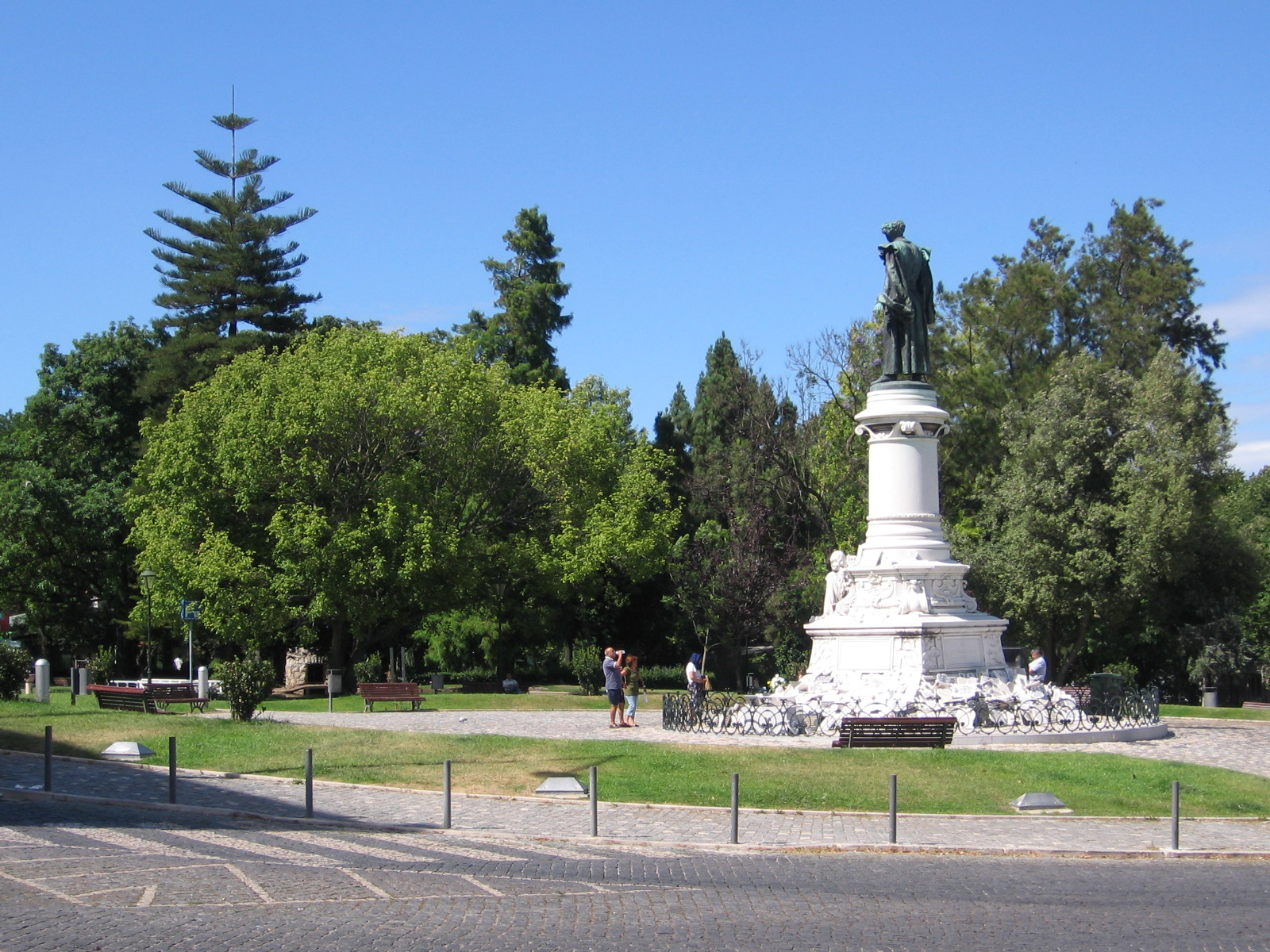
The monument to José Tomás de Sousa Martins, physician and benefactor, in Jardim Braamcamp Freire

The parish of Pena occupies one of the hilltops in Lisbon, namely Santana, which extends from Largo São Domingos until Estefânia and from Portas de Santo Antão to Desterro. It is part of the historical quarter of Lisbon, and is encircled by the civil parishes of Santa Justa, Socorro, Anjos, São Jorge de Arroios, Coração de Jesus and São José.

The centre of the parish is the Jardim Braamcamp Freire (English: Braamcamp Freire Garden), dedicated to the republican historian and archeologist, who directly opposed the British administration of William Beresford. After this period of Portuguese history the park was known as the Campo dos Mártires da Pátria (dedicated to the martyrs of the fatherland), which was commonly referred to as the Campo de Santana until the 18th century.
