= Infante Francisco, Duke of Beja =

Portuguese infante (1691–1742)

Infante Francisco
- Duke of Beja
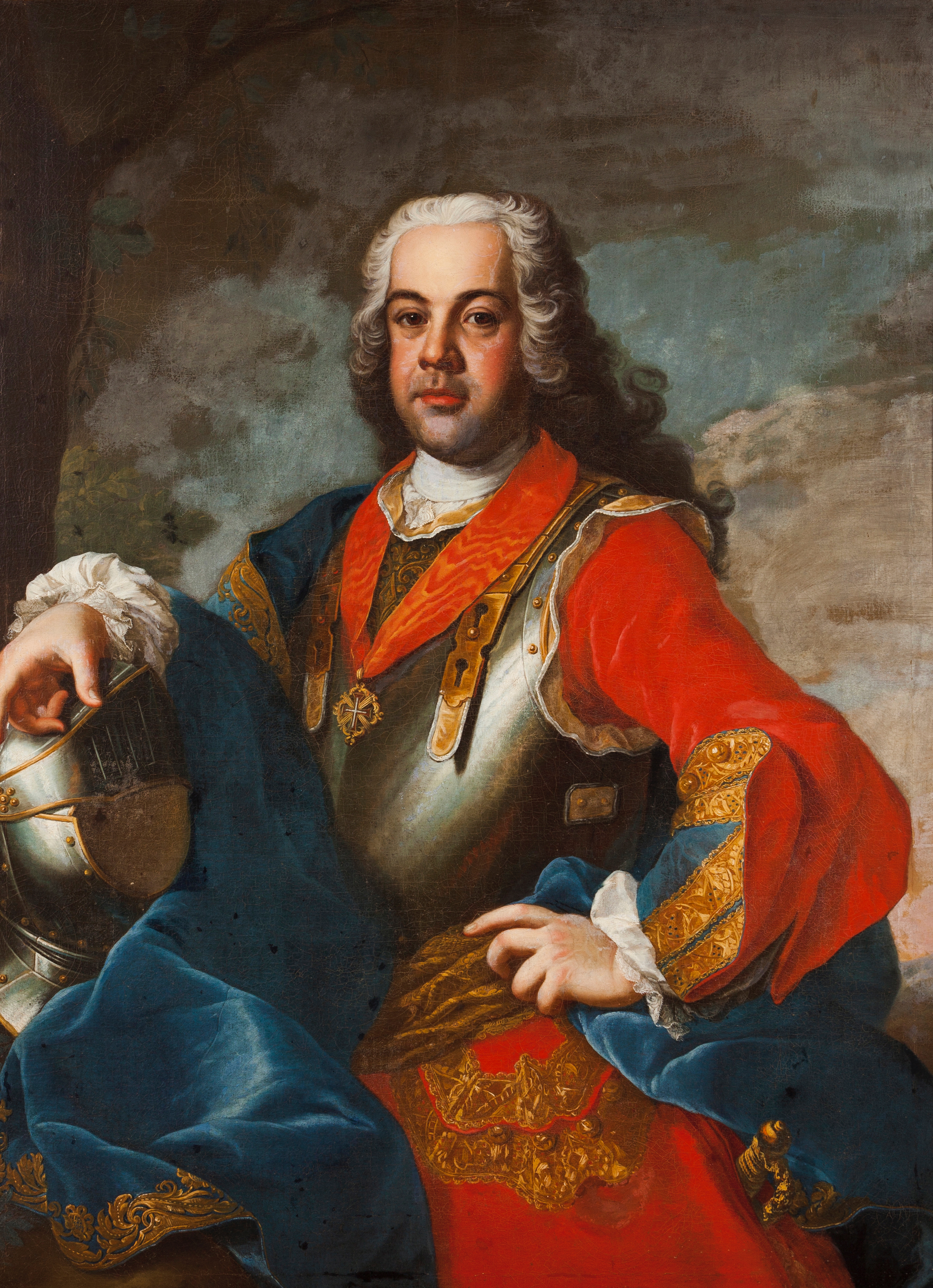
- Portrait by Domenico Duprà, 1729–1730
- Born: 25 May 1691; Lisbon, Kingdom of Portugal
- Died: 21 July 1742 (aged 51); Óbidos, Kingdom of Portugal
- Burial: Royal Pantheon of the Braganza Dynasty
- Issue: Pedro of Braganza; João da Bemposta
Names
- Francisco Xavier José António Bento Urbano
- House: House of Braganza
- Father: Pedro II of Portugal
- Mother: Maria Sofia of the Palatinate

Infante Francisco, Duke of Beja (Portuguese pronunciation: [fɾɐ̃ˈsiʃku]) (Lisbon, 25 May 1691 – Lisbon, 21 July 1742) was a Portuguese infante (prince) son of Peter II, King of Portugal, and his second wife, Maria Sofia of the Palatinate.

== Early life ==
Francisco Xavier José António Bento Urbano was born on 25 May 1691 in Lisbon. He was given the Duchy of Beja and was made Grand-Prior of Crato and Lord of the Infantado. Plans for him to marry Archduchess Maria Magdalena of Austria sister of Queen Maria Anna failed in the early stages.

== Career ==
Responding to a request by Pope Clement XI to aid in the fight against the Turks, in 1716, King John V of Portugal (Infante Francisco's brother) sent a fleet of Portuguese ships to aid Venice and Austria in their fights against the Turks, led by the Count of Rio Grande, the Count of São Vicente and by the Duke of Beja.

== Affairs and issue ==
He died unmarried and without legitimate issue on 21 July 1742 at the Quinta das Gaeiras in Óbidos. He is buried at the Royal Pantheon of the Braganza Dynasty in Lisbon.

He had two natural children with Mariana Silveira, a nun, who died during the 1755 Lisbon earthquake:

- Pedro of Braganza (¿? – 1741)
- João da Bemposta (1725–1780) Captain General of the Portuguese Navy and Chief Steward of the Royal Household. Married Maria Margarida de Lorena, 2nd Duchess of Abrantes.

== Ancestry ==
Ancestors of Infante Francisco, Duke of Beja

8. Teodósio II, Duke of Braganza
4. John IV of Portugal
9. Ana de Velasco y Girón
2. Peter II of Portugal
10. Manuel, 8th Duke of Medina Sidonia
5. Luisa de Guzmán
11. Juana de Sandoval y de la Cerda
1. Francisco, Duke of Beja
12. Wolfgang William, Count Palatine of Neuburg
6. Philip William, Elector Palatine
13. Magdalene of Bavaria
3. Maria Sophia of Neuburg
14. George II, Landgrave of Hesse-Darmstadt
7. Elisabeth Amalie of Hesse-Darmstadt
15. Sophia Eleonore of Saxony

== Bibliography ==
- Nizza da Silva, Maria Beatriz (2009). Reis de Portugal: D. João V (in Portuguese). Lisbon: Temas & Debates.
