= São Jorge de Arroios, Lisbon =

São Jorge de Arroios
- Civil parish
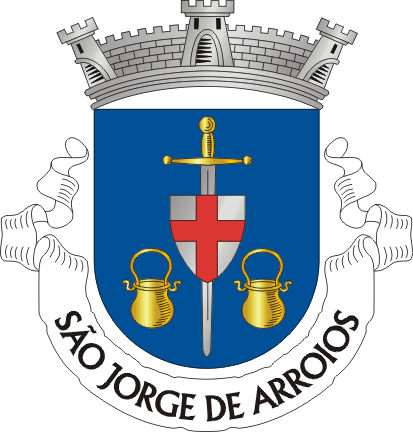
- Coat of arms

- Location in Portugal
- Coordinates: 38°43′N 9°08′W
- Country: Portugal
- Region: Lisbon
- Metropolitan area: Lisbon
- District: Lisbon
- Municipality: Lisbon
- Disbanded: 2012

Area
  - Total: 1.13 km^{2} (0.44 sq mi)

Population (2001)
  - Total: 17,413
  - Density: 15,000/km^{2} (40,000/sq mi)
- Time zone: UTC+00:00 (WET)
  - Summer (DST): UTC+01:00 (WEST)

São Jorge de Arroios (English: Saint George in Arroios) is a former parish (freguesia) in the municipality of Lisbon, Portugal. With the administrative reorganization of Lisbon on 8 December 2012 it became part of the parish of Arroios.

== Main sites ==
- Sotto Mayor Palace
