= House of the Infantado =

The Palace of Queluz was part of the Infantado prior to becoming a royal palace.

The House of the Infantado (Portuguese: Casa do Infantado) was an appanage for the second eldest son of the Portuguese monarch.

== History ==
The House of the Infantado was created in 1654 by King John IV of Portugal from properties and riches confiscated from the Marquis of Vila Real, supporters of House of Habsburg during the Portuguese Restoration War. It belonged to and was passed on to the second-born son of each King — i.e., the Infante that was not entitled to the crown — as his appanage. This member of the Portuguese royal family was known as the Lord of the House of the Infantado (Senhor da Casa do Infantado) or simply the Lord of the Infantado (Senhor do Infantado).

The measure was intended to "perpetuate and extend as much as possible the blood of the royal family." The extinction of the House of Aviz in 1580 had brought the Kingdom of Portugal in personal union with Spain, de facto subjecting the country to Spanish rule. Thus the country's independence depended also on the fertility of the royal house. With a large income, second sons are encouraged to marry to produce cadet branches capable of perpetuating the royal line.

The basis of the donation was the city of Beja, with the ducal title, which belonged to King Manuel I of Portugal. As this income was not enough, the lands Vila Real and Caminha, confiscated in 1641, were added to it.

The donation covered the villages, places, castles, padroados, land, forums, rights and duties for the second house, which guaranteed the title of Duke of Vila Real to the eldest son of Infante Dom Pedro. The House continued to receive new grants from the crown: the fifth of Queluz and their appurtenances; the palaces and houses of Corte-Real in Lisbon, which had belonged to the 2nd Marquis of Castelo Rodrigo; the town of Serpa and with their barns and de Moura; rents of the Military Order of Christ to which the infante had been named Commander; the marshlands of Golegã, Borba, Mouchões and Silveira, near the Tagus river, from São Liborio to Santarém; saboarias of Porto and villages and places of Entre Douro and Minho and Tras-os-Montes.

Other favors were added after the accession of Afonso VI, giving Dom Pedro an annual grant of 1000 quintals of Brazil wood without payment of duties; and the purchase that he made from his sister, Queen Catherine of Braganza, of the city of Lamego and the marsh of Magos.

Thus, it was not just dominial extension defining the House of Infantado, but the whole of their income in vast urban and rural areas from Tras-os-Montes to Alentejo. Its main wealth was agricultural, but also benefited from maritime interests (Caminha, Aveiro) and rivers. Thus, after the King of Portugal and the Prince of Brazil, the Infantado was the wealthiest household in the Kingdom in terms of seigneurial demesnes.

The primary purpose of the appanage was to enrich the secundogeniture infante with a source of income that would allow him to retain the status expected of a prince. However, the enormous wealth became a source of strife and discord as it did on the death of the Infante Francisco, Duke of Beja, brother of King John V in 1742. The next younger brother of the King, Dom António, claimed the succession to the House of Infantado, which was instead given to the second son of King John V, which greatly worsened the relationship between the two brothers.

== Heritage ==
The following estates were part of the Casa do Infantado:

- Corte-Real Palace
- Queluz Estate
- Santa Maria da Feira Castle
- Bemposta Palace

== Lords of the Infantado ==
Name	Lifespan	Tenure	Notes	Parents	Image
Pedro	26 April 1648 – 9 December 1706	1645 - 1683	Also: Duke of Beja; Later: King Peter II of Portugal and the Algarves	John IV of Portugal; Luisa de Guzmán	
Francisco	25 May 1691 - 21 July 1742	1696 - 1742	Also: Duke of Beja	Peter II of Portugal; Maria Sophia of Neuburg	
Pedro	5 July 1717 – 25 May 1786	1742 - 1777	Later: King Peter III of Portugal and the Algarves	John V of Portugal; Maria Anna of Austria	
João	13 May 1767 – 10 March 1826	1777 - 1788	Later: King John VI of Portugal and the Algarves	Maria I of Portugal; Peter III of Portugal	
Miguel	26 October 1802 – 14 November 1866	1802 - 1824	Later: King Miguel I of Portugal and the Algarves	John VI of Portugal; Carlota Joaquina of Spain	
