= Royal Patriarchal Music Seminary of Lisbon =

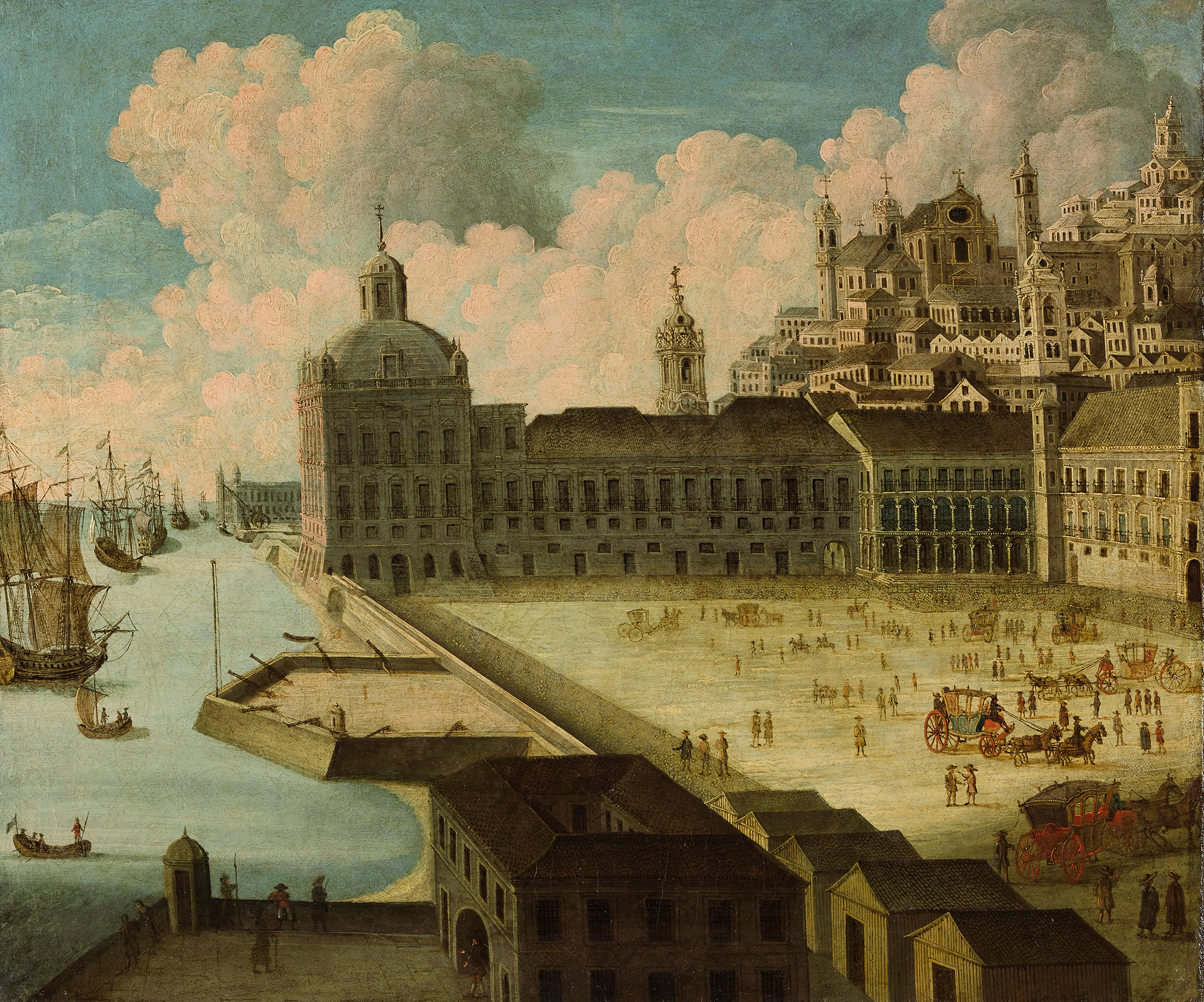
The Terreiro do Paço (Palace Square) and the Ribeira Royal Palace, prior to their destruction in the 1755 Lisbon earthquake

The Royal Patriarchal Music Seminary of Lisbon (Portuguese: Real Seminário de Música da Patriarcal de Lisboa) was founded in 1713 by Portugal's king John V to train singers for his Royal Chapel of Saint Thomas (Portuguese: Capela de São Tomé) at Ribeira Palace (Portuguese: Paço da Ribeira).

Its role was similar to that of other schools which for some centuries had been training singers and musicians for European abbeys, cathedrals, parish and collegiate churches, and court chapels. Over time, its influence expanded as it produced singers, instrumentalists and composers of merit, many of whom took on careers in sacred and secular music including opera both within and outside of Portugal.

According to the records, the official date of the Seminary's foundation was 9 April 1713, three years before the Patriarchate of Lisbon (Portuguese: Patriarcado de Lisboa) came into operation. At that early stage, the Seminary was housed in the Archbishop's Palace near Lisbon Cathedral (Portuguese: Sé Catedral Metropolitana Patriarcal de Santa Maria Maior de Lisboa); but from the outset, the Seminary's function and purpose were directly associated with the court, and once the position of Patriarch of Lisbon was created and the holder became chaplain to the king, the Seminary as part of the patriarchal household continued to serve its primary purpose in providing music in the Royal Chapel.

Although it was neither Portugal's first nor only music school associated with the church (Note: For example, the See of Évora had a school of music which was founded in 1200 and reached its peak in the 16th to 18th centuries. Its syllabus from the outset included music, Latin and rhetoric along with other subjects that were seen as essential for the development of a cathedral choir. This school was closed in 1834 as part of the program in which Portugal's education system was secularised. Most significant for the king as a member of the House of Braganza could have been the College of the Three Holy Magi (Portuguese: Colégio dos Santos Reis Magos) founded at the Ducal Palace of Vila Viçosa by the 7th Duke, Teodósio II. Its syllabus was based on that of the Évora school and it produced many important singers, musicians and composers, some of whom were involved later with the Seminary. The ducal palace's library contained a vast collection of music scores including sacred music from Italy and elsewhere in Europe. These scores were eventually moved to Ribeira Palace and probably provided a resource for the Seminary's use. The Vila Viçosa school was closed in 1834 when religious orders were expelled from Portugal and reopened in 1848 under instructions from the queen, Maria II.), the Seminary's location in Lisbon and its relationship with the monarchy placed it at the forefront of Portugal's music life at this time.

It remained the country's most important music school until it was closed in 1834 and replaced the following year by the Lisbon Conservatory (Portuguese: Conservatório de Música).

According to one analysis, "In it [the Seminary] was formed the great majority of our most outstanding eighteenth-century composers" including Francisco António de Almeida, João Rodrigues Esteves, António Teixeira, José Joaquim dos Santos, António Leal Moreira, Marcos Portugal, and others.

== The Patriarchate of Lisbon and its Seminary ==
=== John the "Absolutist" in power ===
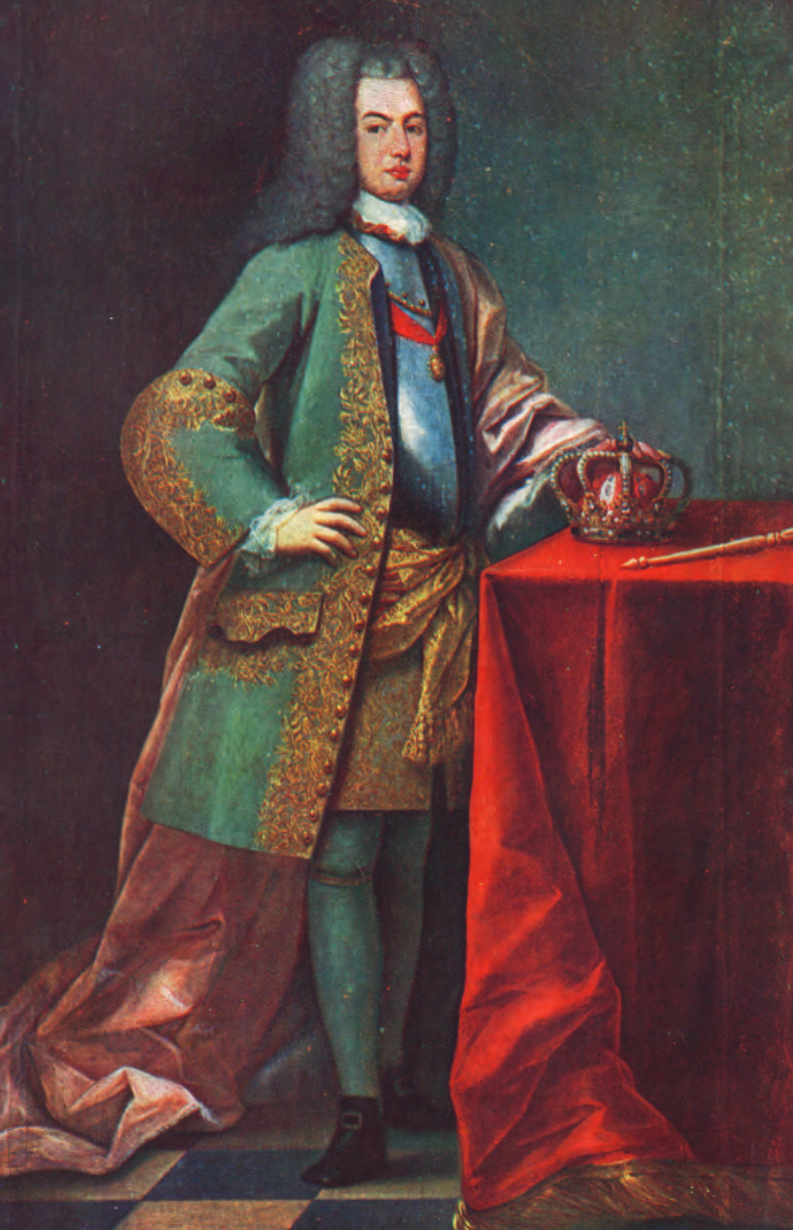
John V, King of Portugal, painted in c. 1730 by Jean Ranc (1710–1780), in the Joanine Library, University of Coimbra

Historical analysis places emphasis on the fact that John V reigned according to the absolutist model of monarchy, one which assumed the monarch to be ruling according to Divine Right and subject to no higher power except, ultimately, God's judgement. Therefore, while the crown could seek advice or counsel from others, usually members of the nobility or aristocracy, he or she was not subject to follow their direction, nor was the monarch ever seen as a purely symbolic head of state as in a constitutional monarchy.

John V was following a model set up by his father, Peter II who began his rule in 1683 and was later recognised as Portugal's first absolutist monarch.

Towards the end of Peter II's reign, alluvial gold was discovered in the Colony of Brazil and from that emerged a massive international trade which restored Portugal's wealth to the same level it had enjoyed in the 15th and early 16th centuries.

A fifth of the value of all gold mined flowed directly to the king's treasury, allowing him to allocate it wherever he wished. But while the industry was in its infant stages during the last decade of Peter II's life, the greatest income emerged during the new king's reign. From John V's hands, a substantial amount of this money was mortgaged to the country's upper classes to advance their lifestyle, even more was spent by the king on state projects such as the complete rebuilding of the University of Coimbra, the expansion and modernisation of the navy, and the royal family pursued its own objectives in erecting the grand-scale, 1,200 room Palace of Mafra (Portuguese: Palácio de Mafra) and rebuilding the Braganza dynasty's ducal palace at Vila Viçosa. As one description summed it all up:

"John V … reigned over the great flowering of Portuguese art and culture. Architecture blossomed as it had done under the first colonial empire of King Manuel in the early sixteenth century. Royal palaces and noble manor houses mirrored the splendour which Spain had built from Latin American mining revenues. A small cultured elite became conversant with the world of learning and built fine libraries. Diplomats and even members of the royal family travelled through Europe and acquired cosmopolitan tastes. Churches were lavished with gilded carvings and ornamental decoration. The aristocracy ostentatiously rode in carriages wearing their finest robes. … The Lisbon élite were fashion-conscious and like to be seen in clothes of the latest Paris design. The king was said to possess more clothes than all the fashion houses of Lisbon put together. In order to keep their costumes clean in the narrow streets which served as drains and latrines the beautiful ones were carried in litters, curtained off from the popular gaze. Churchmen also had their bearers, coaches and escorts when they went out wining and dining."

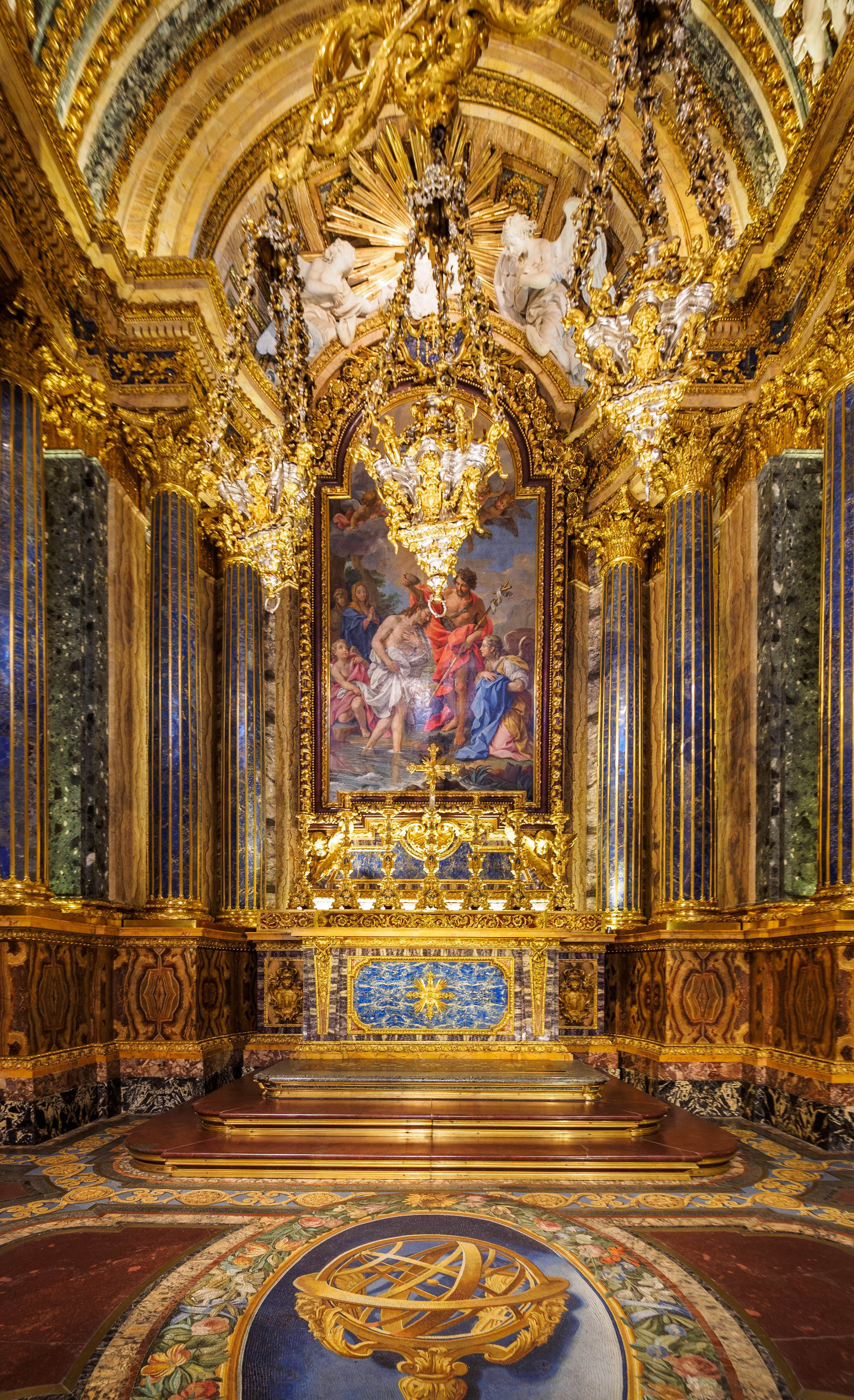
Chapel of St John the Baptist (Portuguese: Capela de São João Baptista), Church of St. Roch (Portuguese: Igreja de São Roque), Lisbon, built on order of John V and said to be the most costly chapel in Europe.

The negative side of this was that the king was highly selective about spending money on practical projects such as improving the public's education standards, repairing the country's shabby roads or building new ones, developing new industries or reforming agriculture where large amounts of land were not in use except as country estates and hunting grounds for the wealthy who, along with the largest land-owner of all, the church, were exploiting those without means while turning a blind eye to their needs. In fact, the life of the poor did not change:

"The wealth of the few was matched by the poverty of the many. Peasants lived in almost feudal conditions of dependency. Fine palaces were not reflected in improvements to domestic and rural housing. The flowering of aristocratic learning was not mirrored by the development of public education or popular literacy. … Subsistence and survival were the hallmark of popular experience throughout the 'golden age'."

Therefore, in assessing Portugal's long-term gain from Brazil's gold, the criterion, aptly named the "empire extraction rate", which judges the extent to which income drawn from an empire's colonial resources was used to expand home-based economic resilience, finds that because John V had spent his revenue on personal extravagance while ignoring Portugal's broader, long-term economic needs. The decline in income from Brazil's gold, which began after about 1740 and had fully depleted by 1750, left the country's per capita income as low as during its first bout of empire expansion in the 16th century.

By the second half of the 18th century, along with Spain, Portugal was the poorest of Europe's empires while, because of good investment on the home front, Britain and the Netherlands were the wealthiest. In addition, John V ignored the need to maintain his army and navy, and after his death the country became more reliant on the help of its wealthy ally, Britain, with consequences that would play against the country's and monarchy's stability in the not-so-distant future.

But that was of no concern to the king because, with Portugal riding high on its wealth, during his reign he had no need to call a meeting of the Cortes, the last of which had been assembled by Peter II to recognise John as the rightful successor to the throne, and he was able to reign with autonomy and self-confidence. Further, it would seem logical to assume that without the discovery of gold in Brazil and the subsequent generation of wealth in John V's hands, it would have been unlikely that setting up the Patriarchate and the Seminary would have been possible.

=== The pope submits to the king ===
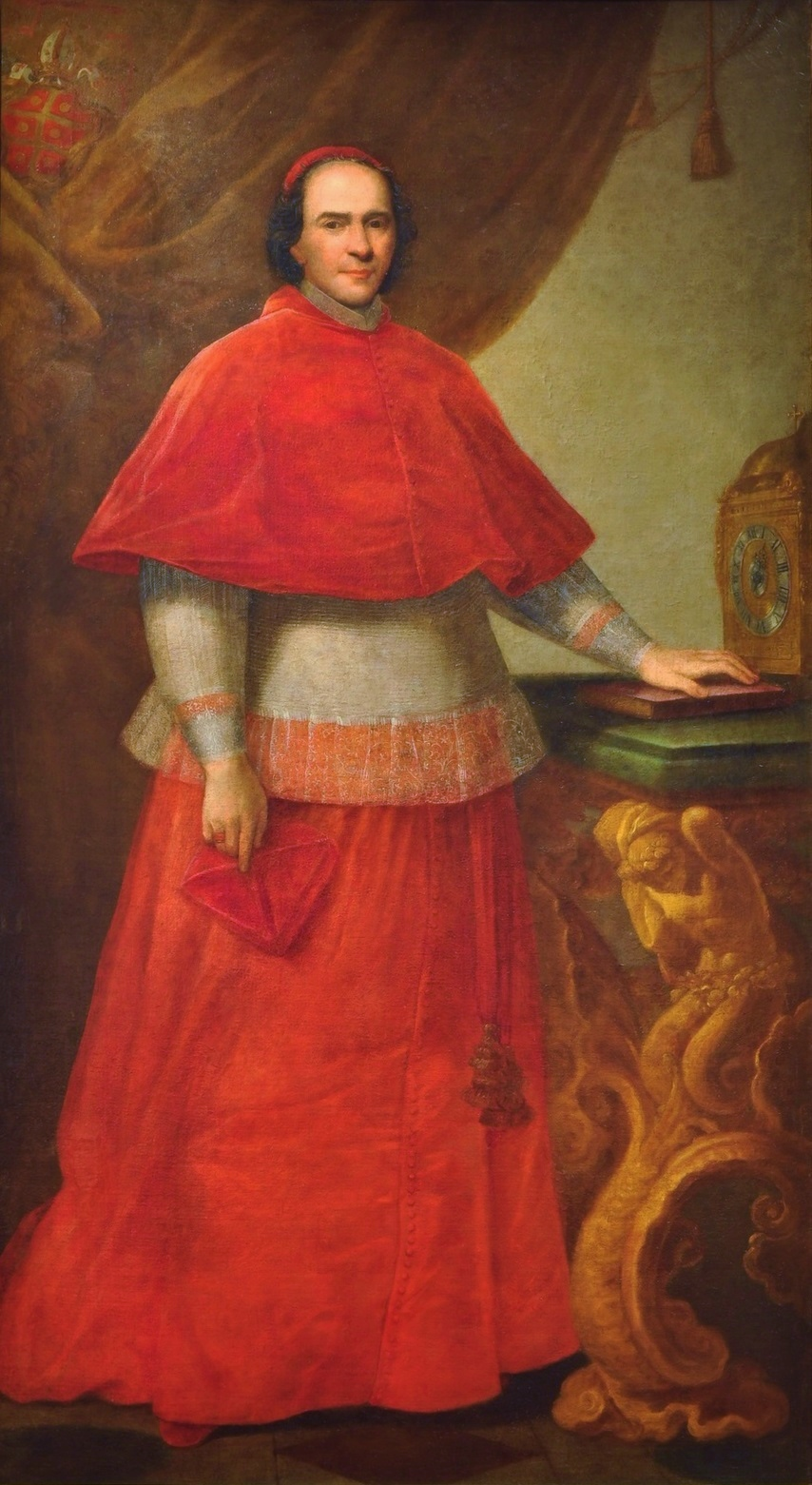
Tomás de Almeida, first Patriarch of Lisbon. Painted c. 1725 by Giorgio Domenico Duprà (1689–1770). In the collections of the Monastery of São Vicente de Fora, Lisbon.

The Patriarchate of Lisbon came into being following extensive pressure by John V on the papacy. Papal approval was issued by Pope Clement XI on 7 November 1716 in the so-called "Golden Bull", In supremo apostolatus solio (Note: In a summary of the pope's intention, Clemente lists three reasons: 1) D. João V piously corresponded to the papal request, well in keeping with the traditional zeal of the Portuguese kings in defending and propagating the faith, and even sent a navy to combat the Turks. 2) D. João V manifested the desire to have in his palace a cathedral, elevating to this condition the collegiate of São Tomé. 3) To this end, the Pope divided in two the archdiocese of Lisbon, hosting one in the royal chapel and the other where it was, divided to east and west from the "oldest walls of the city.") by which the former archiepiscopal see of Lisbon was divided in two, the court's collegiate church was elevated, now under dedication to Our Lady of the Assumption, to the status of cathedral for the new see of Western Lisbon, and the ordinary was given the new title of Patriarch with a leadership role within the wider church in Portugal and its empire. (Note: Again, to explain the pope's reason behind this arrangement, Clemente quotes directly from the Bull: "Finally, considering that the said metropolitan church of western Lisbon, which we have erected and instituted by the present letters, exists in the royal palace of Lisbon, and in it many times the royal people may be present to the ecclesiastical functions, we deem it very convenient that the same metropolitan church of western Lisbon and the one who at all times is archbishop of western Lisbon be awarded with greater pardons, privileges and prerogatives by special indulgence of ours and of the Apostolic See.") At the same time, the patriarch was to fulfil a role as First Court Chaplain (Portuguese: Capelão-mor). (Note: 18th century German Protestant geographer, historian, educator and theologian Anton Friedrich Büsching who visited Portugal at this time made specific reference to this role being performed by the patriarch.) The first patriarch was Tomás de Almeida whose formal entry into Lisbon and enthronement took place on 13 February 1717. He was elevated to the cardinalate in 1737 and remained in office as patriarch until his death in 1754.

This sublimation of the patriarch to the authority of the king was demonstrated by the co-relationship of the patriarchal throne within the king's court, the fact that the patriarch was also the king's chaplain, and by virtue of the way the king constructed the patriarchal residence as a wing of Ribeira Palace. As a member of the court, the patriarch was in a position to be consulted by the king but at the same time subject to his commands. (Note: While the Patriarchate continued to exist, Pope Benedict XIV judged the existence of two metropolitical archdioceses in one city as clumsy and unnecessary and on 13 December 1740 issued a Papal Bull entitled Salvatoris nostri Mater which reunited them, returning Lisbon Cathedral to its role as the archiepiscopal seat for the patriarch.)

Although the Seminary's foundation preceded the establishment of the Patriarchate of Lisbon by three years, once this new church structure was in place, the Seminary was absorbed into the patriarch's household. While its primary function, according to the king's own intention, was to train singers to perform within the court's liturgies provided by the patriarch, the Seminary's staff and students were seen as members of the patriarchal staff and its operating costs were met out of the patriarch's own budget.

=== The king's motivation ===
The founding of the Seminary and the creation of the Patriarchate along with activities associated with both are often discussed under the umbrella term "Romanization." Musicologist João d'Alvarenga saw the creation of the Patriarchate as "the first major achievement in a long-standing and complex political and diplomatic project designed to legitimize the Portuguese crown and the Bragança dynasty both internally and on the international stage", a statement which interprets the king's motivation as based on the status of the monarchy as embodied in himself and on his ducal dynasty which had occupied the Portuguese throne from 1640 after the 8th Duke had grappled it from the hands of Spain to become João IV.

A key motivating factor for John V was, according to d'Alvarenga, because "the church was a vital instrument of social control once its symbolic resources were placed in the service of an absolutist power", "gaining the endorsement of Rome" was seen by him as a way of ensuring that he could gain and maintain his political power. Winning favour with the Papacy "was a project of considerable diplomatic ambition, costing him huge sums of money – even to the point of financing the ballooning deficits of the Papal States", and "meant disrupting historic court hierarchies and – especially important for our purposes – transforming the rituals by which the monarchy was legitimized, in part by confounding these rituals with newly adopted ceremonial practices derived from the Roman church."

d'Alvarenga's analysis is further amplified by history researcher Ana Ribeiro who wrote regarding this development:

"Political power is viewed as a construction that aimed to transmit, to both the powerful and the common people, an image of the king’s power which inherently conveyed image of social organization. In this context, the ceremonies and their rituals are understood as a language, a functional expression of a political message that emphasised "the natural order of social bodies" in the regal perception. This "functional view" justifies the effort made by historians to reconstruct these ceremonies, giving special attention to social position, as well as to the words and gestures of each protagonist, because this role or ritual formalization may be employed as a benchmark of social interaction which opens doors to the understanding of the hierarchies that dominated the organization of power and society in early modern Portugal."

The significance in the king's mind of this 'organic' relationship between monarchy and church emerged clearly in contemporary comments written by both Portuguese observers and visitors from other countries. For example:

"The seat of the Lisbon Patriarchy is in the chapel of the King's palace. As regards its architecture and paintings they are very ordinary: but the temple is vast. Besides the main altar, there are twelve other altars, with magnificent decorations. There is a large two-storey tribune, with lattices, where the King and Queen usually attend Mass. On Sundays and feast days the Patriarch often officiates, accompanied by eighteen mitred canons. The choir, composed of some thirty or forty beneficiaries, is accompanied by music in the Roman style, without any instruments; and there are a number of excellent voices among the many heard there."

John V's reforms are sometimes interpreted as signs of his personal religious devotion (Note: As Clemente says of the creation of the Patriarchate, "John V was actively involved, as in everything that combined the prestige of monarchy and personal piety, which he never lacked." At the time, not all would have agreed. For example, Voltaire's caustic remark was, "When he wanted a festival, he ordered a religious parade. When he wanted a new building, he built a convent. When he wanted a mistress, he took a nun." As with most European male monarchs, João had mistresses and it is recorded that, in addition to the six legitimate children born by the queen, there were at least four others born by other women. Three of those, known as the Children of Palhavã (Portuguese: Meninos de Palhavã) were formally recognised by him in a decree signed in 1742 but not published until 1752. Whatever he may have known privately about the king, in 1748 Pope Benedict XIV granted him and his heirs the style "Sua Majestade Fidelíssima" (Most Faithful Majesty) which was continued in use until 1910.), but as much as that may have been a factor, it is more significant that they were closely integrated with his role as king and how he demonstrated it to those around him. Furthermore, the Royal Chapel's ritual was only a portion of the ceremonial nature of court life; or conversely, the ritualised nature of the king's public life even extended into the more specific environment of attending liturgies in the chapel. As Ribeira says:

"The presence of religion, but above all, religion serving the interests of the regal image, was visible in the day-to-day activities of the royal court and its ceremonies. As religion was an important factor of social cohesion, and the ceremonies were a basic tenet of the establishment of hierarchies and social positions, the king controlled these ceremonies and their liturgy, associating his image and his mission with a holy design. As Paula Marçal Lourenço commented, "The magnificent churches, the royal processions, the Patriarchal parades, the richness of the vestments and the cult objects, the canonisations and the solemn Te Deum, all contribute to surround the regal figure, patron and demigod, with feelings of collective loyalty, but also of separation, distance, divine intangibility". For example, the king going to mass was a point when a religious ceremony was used as a place and time to formalise hierarchies, since the proximity of any chosen courtiers to the monarch during the liturgy established their prestige. Hence, the religious space and the solemnity of its function operated as an instrument of exclusion (and inclusion) that the monarch was able to use to maintain harmony in the universe of the court.

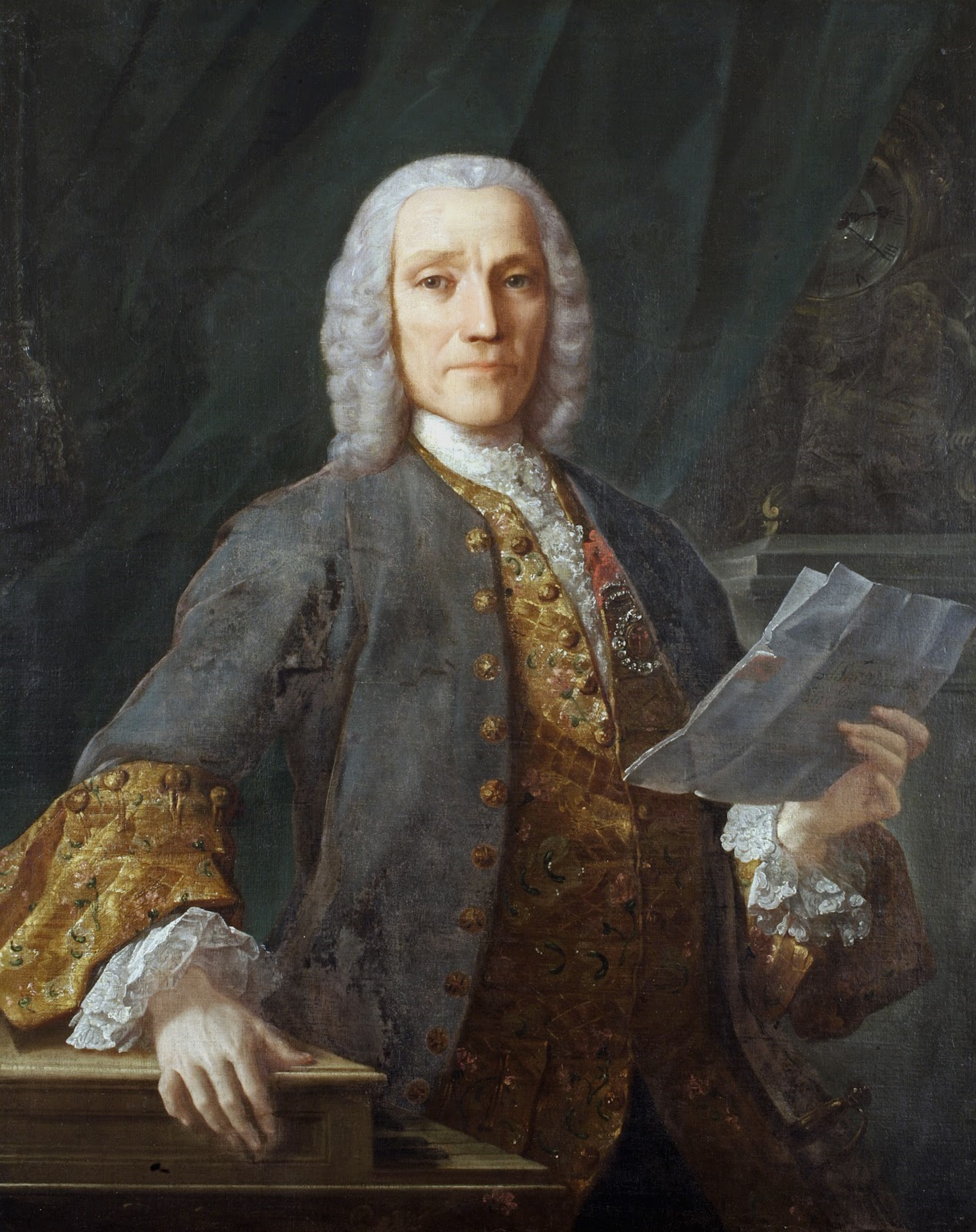
Portrait of Domenico Scarlatti (1685-1757), 1738, by Domingo Antonio Velasco (in the collections of Casa-Museu dos Patudos, Alpiarça)

In summary then, the "Romanization" of the king's own patriarchal church was achieved by: (1) the "adoption of the liturgy, ritual and ceremonial of the Papal Chapels"; (2) "importing Roman chant books"; (Note: According to Brito, the importation of liturgical music was a great deal more diverse: "In his desire to follow the liturgy of the Papal Chapel, John V ordered copies of all the choirbooks used in the Vatican. He also had copies made of the Ambrosian ceremonial in Milan, with its music, as well as those of the Greek and Armenian Churches, the Syriac Mass, and the liturgical books of the Maronites, the Nestorians and the Syrian Orthodox Church, translated by the librarian of the Vatican, D, S, Assemani. All these books were lost in the 1755 earthquake.") (3) training many chaplain-singers [and] three young Portuguese composers in Rome at the expense of the crown; (4) bringing trained singers, mostly castrati, from Rome; (4) the appointment of Bishop Gabrielle de Cimballi, formerly Master of Ceremonies in the Vatican's Pontifical Chapel, as Principal Master of Ceremonies to the Patriarch and to teach chaplain-singers how to perform Roman chant; and (5) in the first half of the century, the importing of leading Roman musicians Domenico Scarlatti, maestro di cappella in the Cappella Giulia of St. Peter's Basilica and Giovanni Giorgi, maestro di cappella of the Archbasilica of St. John Lateran.

== Teaching environment ==
=== Syllabus influenced by Naples ===
The Seminary's syllabus was directly influenced by the four old music conservatories of Naples. Originally founded in the 17th century as charitable religious institutions for children who were homeless, abandoned or orphans, by the 18th century, these institutions had developed into proper music schools, with a combination of day and boarding students, and fees were often charged for attendance. (Note: In Italian, the word conservati was used to mean 'an orphan'; hence its expansion into conservatorio as a place where care was provided, and was later adapted into common use regarding a tertiary music school as a conservatorium or conservatoire. For a more complete history of the Neapolitan Schools and their role as a model for music schools throughout Europe, see)

Singing was a core subject right from the outset, as was composition for students who demonstrated skills in this area. The range of instruments being taught varied between different conservatories, but it was a standard requirement for all students to have basic keyboard skills, usually both harpsichord and organ because of these instruments' roles in accompaniment and continuo playing and as a fundamental to the Baroque ensemble. Singing teachers and choir masters taught solfège (Italian: solfeggio) as the sight-reading system. With the broad range of skills gained through these study programs, Naples' alumni were equally capable of being employed later in sacred and secular music.

At the height of their development, these conservatories had gained an international reputation, enhanced by producing some of Europe's celebrated composers and musicians This meant these institutions were able to draw students from many other European countries.

=== Adaptation in Lisbon ===
Development of the Seminary's syllabus was governed by the fact that the training of singers for the Royal Chapel was its primary purpose. As in Naples, studying the harpsichord with its associated instruments, the clavichord, and the organ, and developing skills in the use of solfège (Portuguese: solfejo or solfa) were all compulsory, and every student received instruction in composition.

However, the Lisbon syllabus took on some characteristics of it own, especially by the time of the 1764 Statutes where it was stated that Seminarians should become "sejao peritos na Muzica, Gramatica, Ler, e escrever, e Orgao" (experts in Music, Grammar, Reading, Writing, and Organ) and that they should be educated in the "obricaçoes de catholicos, e na politica civil, venda cada no semana se sabem a doutrina Christam, e que se confessem todos os mezes ao menes huma vez, e nas festas principaes de Christo, N. S^{ra}., Apostolos, e en algums Jubileos" (Catholic obligations, and in civil politics, to instruct each week so they know Christian doctrine, and to confess at least once each month, and at the major feasts of Christ, Our Lady, the Apostles, and on some Jubilees).

Similar to the way the Neapolitan conservatories structured their daily programs on monastic lines, the Seminary also had a set timetable, beginning each day between 5.30 am and 6.30 am, depending on the time of year, and ending at 10.00 pm, alternating individual music lessons with class-based teaching, individual and class-based grammar lessons, instruction in religion, participation in Mass and the Divine Office, private penances and prayers, time for individual instrument practice, and assembly for meals. Later in its development, the syllabus expanded to include subjects such as Latin and Italian.

Once the Patriarchate had been housed in a new wing of Ribeira Palace, the Seminary was moved into adjacent premises on the now-gone Rua da Calcetaria, where it remained until the 1755 "Terramoto".

=== Staff structure ===
The staff structure and the names of staff and students from the Seminary's early period are largely unknown. Evidence shows that under the joint umbrella of the royal court and the Patriarchate, there were many more singers and musicians employed to provide liturgical and other music than those directly involved with the Seminary, and even within the Patriarchate itself, there was clear differentiation between the Seminary's teaching and the patriarchal music staff, even though they were all paid from the same budget. At the outset, it may well have been that the Seminary had a skeleton administrative staff, and the bulk of teaching was provided by choir masters, organists, composers and others who were on the court or patriarchal staff or who were employed elsewhere in Lisbon.

By the time the 1764 Statutes were issued, a more complex staff structure had appeared. It included the Inspector (Superintendent), the Reitor (Rector), the Vice Reitor (Vice Rector), the Mestres de Solfa (Masters of Solfège), the Mestres de Gramática (Masters of Grammar) ("who also taught rhetoric"), ... the Sacristão (Sacristan), the Seminaristas (Seminarians), entre outros (among others, meaning housekeeping staff, servants, and even the tailor).

The Seminarians (Portuguese: Seminaristas) were included in this list because, as their primary purpose was to sing in the patriarch's liturgies, and they received income for this, they too were regarded as part of the patriarchal staff and the conditions of their engagement were spelt out in detail.

The criteria against which staff were selected were spelt out clearly in the 1764 Statutes: for example, the Inspector (Superintendent) – "que seja Ecclesiástico, com intelligéncia de Música, ornado de virtudes, respeito e autoridade" (who is a member of the clergy, with knowledge of music, hallmarked with virtues, respect and authority); and the Reitor (Rector) – "será Presbitero secular com capacidade, Madureza, bom procedimento[,] prudencia, modestia, zelo, e economia, tudo necessario p^{a} o bom regimen, educacáo dos Seminaristas, e que seja sciente na Muzica" (will be a secular Priest with ability, maturity, good demeanour, prudence, modesty, zeal, and economy, all necessary for the good outcome, the education of the Seminarians, and that is the knowledge in music).

=== Selection of students ===
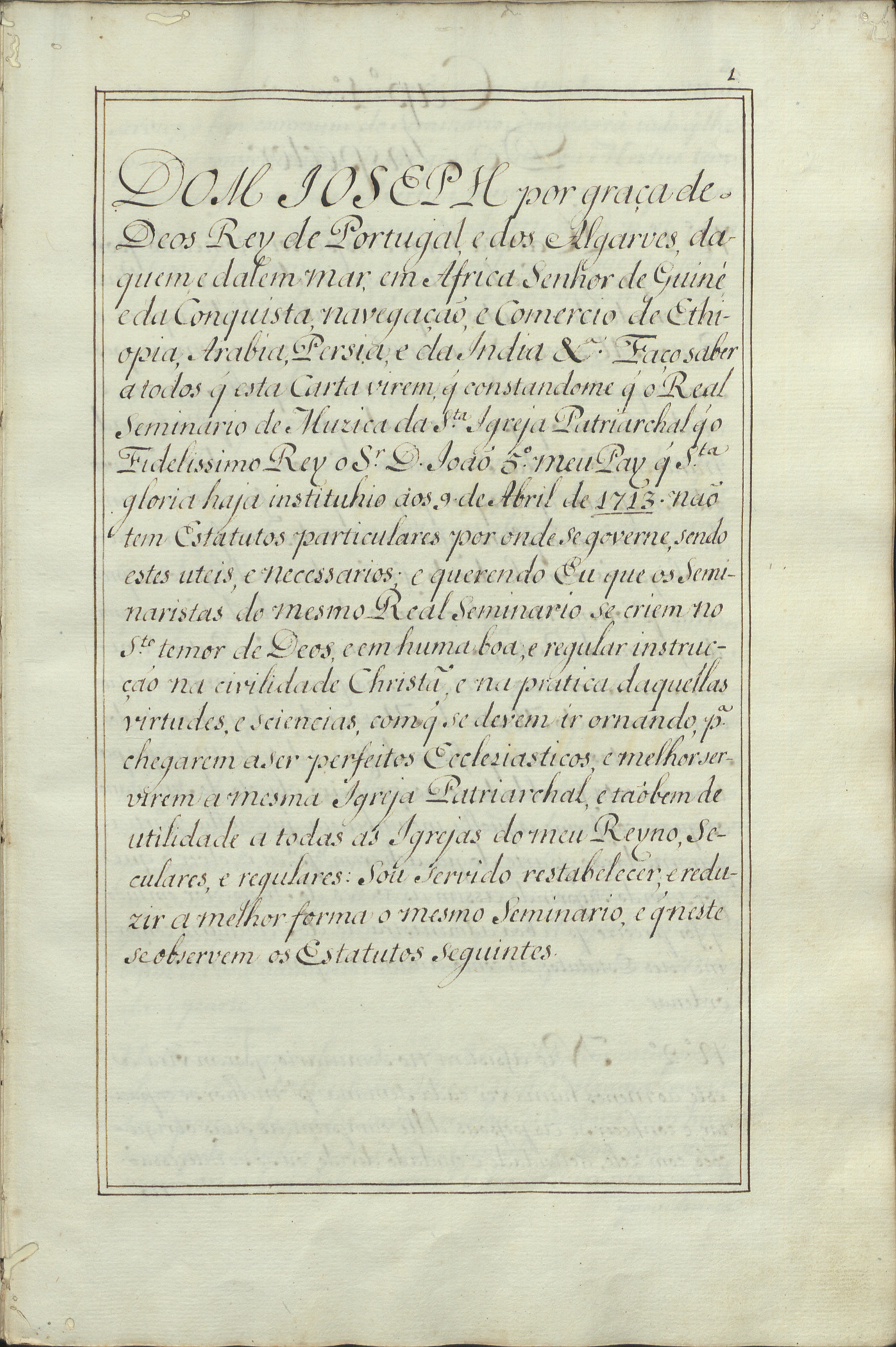
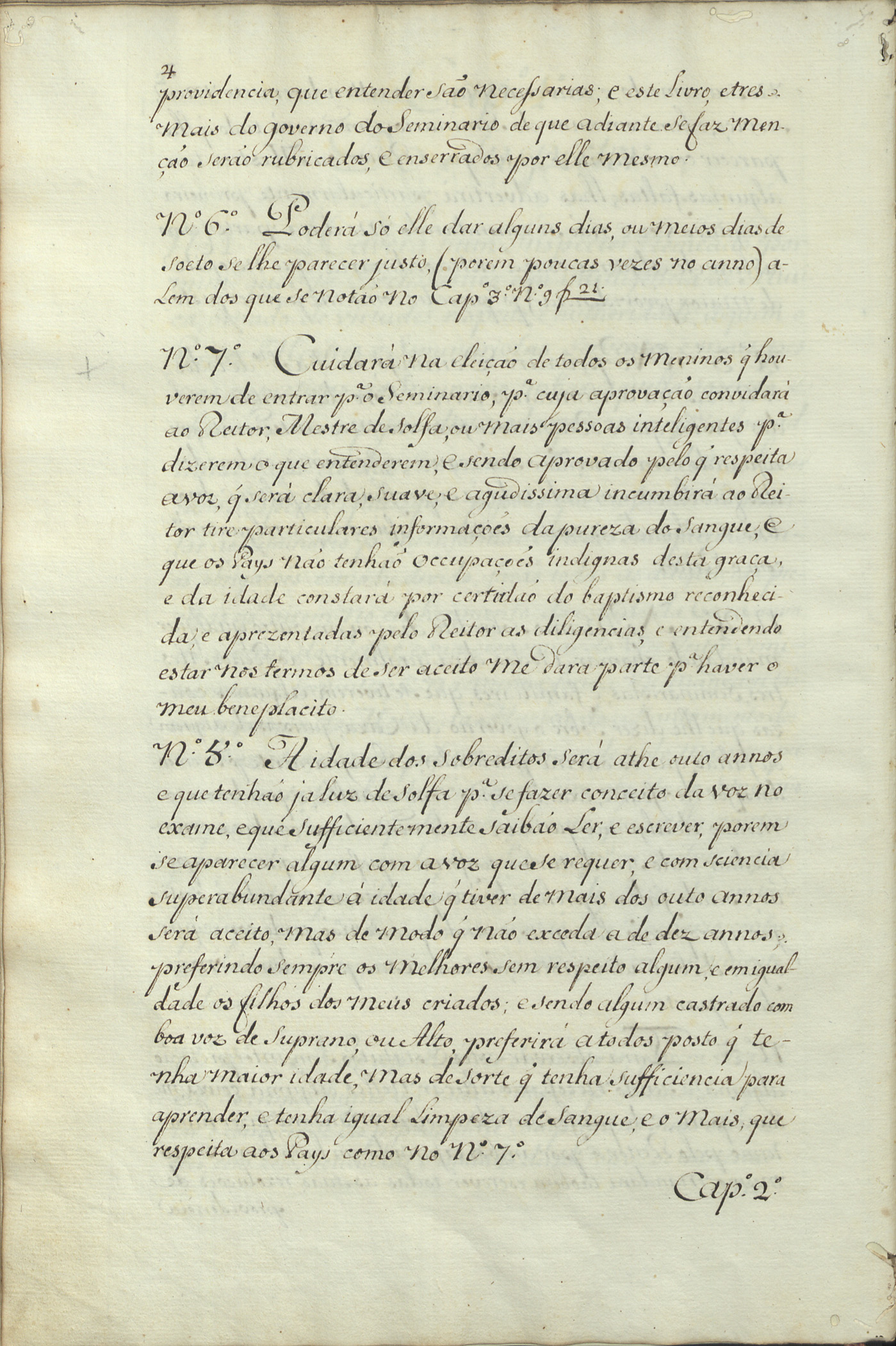
Title page of the Royal Decree of the 1764 Statutes of the Royal Patriarchal Music Seminary, Lisbon (left), and extract from Chapter 1, p. 4 (right). In the collections of the National Library of Portugal.

The process and criteria by which students were selected in the Seminary's early years are not clear, but the standards as stated in the 1764 Statutes show that by that time students were required to have a "voz clara, suave e agudissima" (clear, pleasant and high voice), (Note: Translation is problematic because the word "agudissima" is not in usage in modern Portuguese and its relationship with "suave" has to be taken into account. The Cambridge Dictionary's Portuguese-English online service gives these relevant options for "agudo": "acute, sharp", "high pitched" (eg "Ela tem uma voz aguda." (She has a high-pitched voice)) and "treble, descant" (eg "som agudo" (treble sound)). Taking "agudissima" as the superlative of "agudo" implies the addition of the intensifier "very". So the options for agudissima could be "very high (or high-pitched)", "very acute (or sharp)" or "very treble".) a recognised baptismal certificate, and to come from parents of a respectable occupation. (Note: As Augustin points out, "the statutes do not explain exactly what these occupations would be.") Most students were admitted at the age of 7 or 8 years although older boys could enter if they were already advanced in music studies and had been so assessed (Note: An exception is António José Soares who had been a student at the Vila Viçosa Seminary and then in 1802 at the age of 19 was admitted to the Lisbon Seminary by order of the Prince Regent.) Soares later went on to teach at the Seminary.

Applicants were required to undertake an admission test which was administered by the rector, the solfège master and whoever else was selected as suitable to judge. The majority lived in the boarding school although a small number of day boys (about 50 in 1761) was allowed to attend classes in the afternoon. As already stated, the names of early Seminarists are largely unknown, but from 1748 a detailed Book of Admissions was kept and this reveals the names of those assessed and much of the way in which criteria were applied to each applicant.

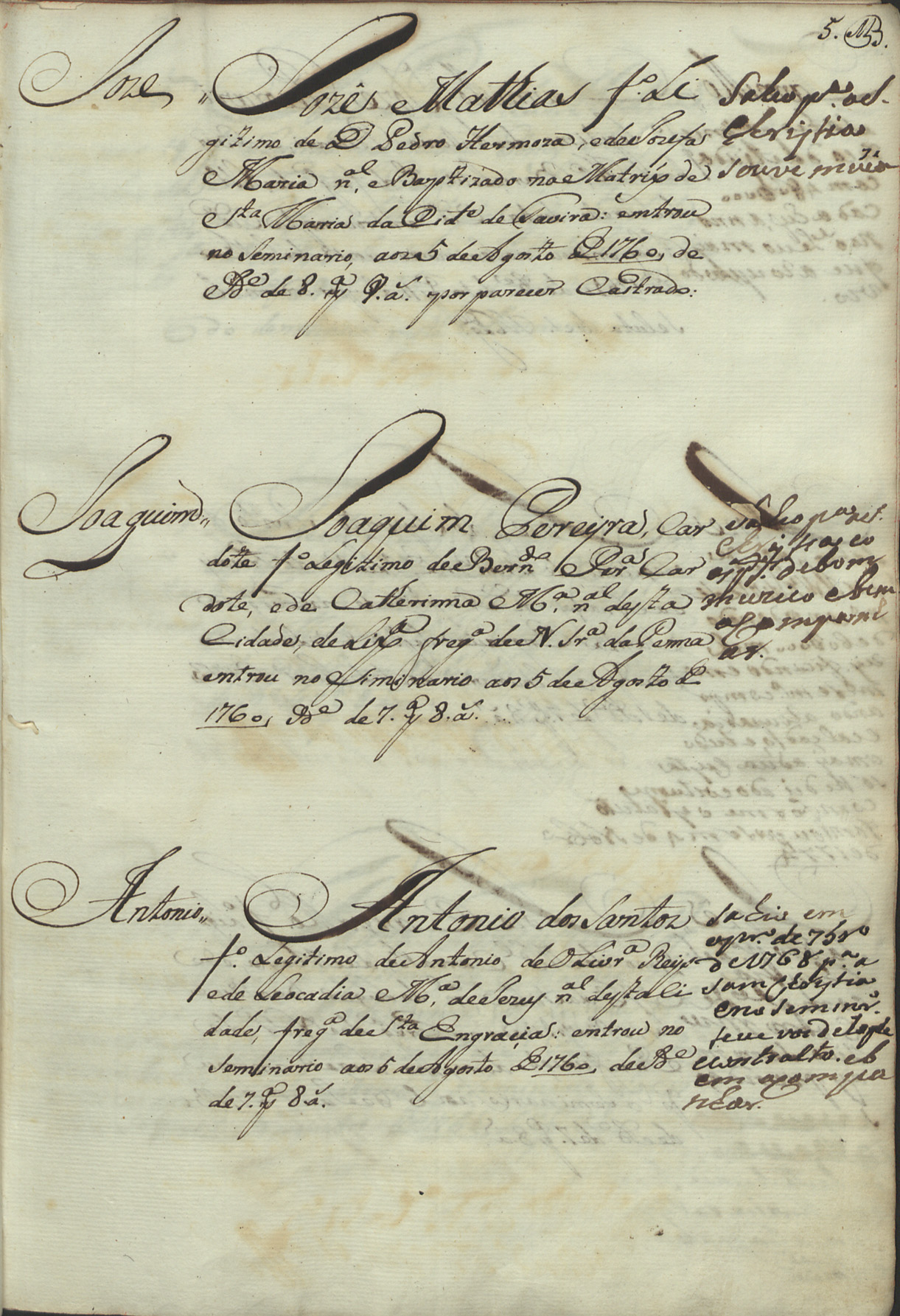
Royal Seminary of the Patriarchal (Lisbon), a book that will record an account of Seminarians' admission to this Royal Seminary according to its Statutes 1748–1820, usually referred to as the Book of Admissions, p. 5. Collection of the Biblioteca Nacional de Portugal.

Fernandes' calculations show that:

"Of the 162 Seminarists included in the Book of Admissions, 107 were from Lisbon (the Ajuda parish was mostly in the 1780s and 1790s, which may be justified by the presence at this site of the Royal Chapel and the Patriarchal from 1792) and 37 from other areas. (...) the school was attended by five high school students from Óbidos, three from Miranda's bishopric, three from Caldas da Rainha, three from Setúbal and three from Peniche. Localities as diverse as Viseu, Lamego, Tavira, Miranda do Corvo, Barcelos, Leiria, Alcobaça, Elvas or Estremoz are represented by a single Seminarian."

=== Training of castrati ===
By the reign of John V, castrati had already been performing in Italy and other European countries since the mid-16th century, and by the mid-18th century there were many on Lisbon's opera stage and in the patriarchal choir.

The first to arrive in Lisbon were members of the choir of St Peter's Basilica, Rome who came to Lisbon in 1716 coinciding with the elevation of the collegiate church to patriarchal status. There was great curiosity among the public and many approved of what they were hearing. At the same time, there were negative responses: a report about gossip regarding the price at which meat from the castrati (carne de castrato) would be sold led the king to say he would punish anyone who derided them. (Note: The statement that the castrati who arrived in 1716 were "the first" could be questioned because, according to documented evidence, Italian, Giovanni Battista Venturino, secretary to papal diplomat Cardinal Alexandrino who was travelling with him in Portugal in 1571 recorded about music in the ducal chapel at Vila Viçosa: "The music was loud and resounding; the singing was of good voices, but so loud, and the singers were mostly eunuchos (castrati), which did not seem to me harmonious or well-coordinated, as it might have been in a larger room." Augustin goes on to say that the claim that these singers were castrati rather than falsettists is disputed by others.)

Evidence suggests that, as had happened in Italy, France and elsewhere, castration became a common practice when Portuguese parents, especially those of limited income, saw it as a way of ensuring their son's admission to a school or progression into a performing career. (Note: Fernandes coordinates the development of castration in Portugal with the reign of John V. However Ginsberg and Leruth say, "They had existed in Portugal and Spain for centuries but they had not been considered as substitutes for male or female singers. In Italy, on the other hand, they quickly became fashionable and a large number of them ("by the thousands," according to Haböck, 1927, p. 150 arrived from Spain and Portugal in the second half of the 16th century." Still referring to the 16th century, Ginsberg and Leruth say that because of high demand, the cost to the church of paying for boys to be castrated became prohibitively high. Therefore, "Determined to further increase the supply of potential singers, the Church decided to offer to any boy who had suffered an "unfortunate accident" (that is, a castration) a guaranteed minimum standard of living in the form of basic food and lodging, together with musical training. This offer was hard to resist for Spanish or Portuguese families and many decided to sacrifice the boyhood of one or several of their sons.")

The date on which the first castrati were enrolled in the Seminary is unknown, but the 1764 Statutes say boys could be admitted if they were "castrated, with a soprano or alto voice" (The implication being that they had already been castrated prior to admission.). However, entries in the Book of Admissions indicate that this was not always the case.

From her examination of the Book of Admissions, Augustin says, "In this book, usually at the end of the record of the name of each seminarist, there are four subtle but distinct ways of describing the castrated student." She then summarises these comments as follows:

Joze de Almeyda, Joze Rodrigues, Joze Pirez Neves and Domingos Martins – "por ser castrado" (to be castrated); Camillo Jorge Dias Cabral – "os dizerem os cirurgiões ser castrado" (tell the surgeons to be castrated); Joaquim de Oliveira – "por dizerem ser castrado" (by telling to be castrated); Manoel Alvares and Joze Mattias – "por parecer castrado" (for an opinion about castration).

Augustin goes on to report:

In the specific case of Joze de Almeyda there is a process dated 11 December 1759, about a cost benefit to his family who had difficulties. This document, which is now stored in the Torre do Tombo, clearly states the physical condition of the singer: "[...] And having informed the said petition to the Rector of the said Seminary, he replied that the Benefactor Joseph George, by resolution of His Majesty, had assured the supplicant to the Seminarian with the obligation of annually giving him nine thousand six hundred réis."

Those students just mentioned, João Pirez [Pires] Neves (Note: Neves was aged 27, probably the oldest student ever taken in, is described as being "clérigo in minoribus" (clergy in minor orders or in a rank lower than subdeacon), and once he had gained music knowledge he would join the patriarchal choir and receive a wage according to his merit. His voice was in the alto range.) and Domingos Martins were admitted on a written instruction from the king dated 3 September 1759 and to be castrated at the king's expense.

Although, as a general rule, castrati retained their high voices into adulthood, this was not always the outcome, and as Fernandes points out, Joaquim de Oliveira and Manuel Alva Mosca both became tenors.

Some castrati went on to successful careers as singers, teachers and composers. But disaster also awaited others: as Fernandes says, "In the margin of the Book of Admissions it was noted that [one applicant] "went to the sacristy, knew music and accompaniment," but should not participate in "singing for being out of tune."

=== Composers and musicians study in Italy ===
To provide advanced training in Italy for Portuguese students, John V allocated funding. The first three, all Seminary alumni, went to Rome, departing during the first half of the 18th century: António Teixeira who went in 1714 and returned to Lisbon in 1728 where he was a chaplain-singer at Lisbon Cathedral and examiner of plainchant for the patriarchy; João Rodrigues Esteves who began studies with composer Giuseppe Ottavio Pitoni in 1719 before returning to Lisbon in 1726 where he became master of music at Lisbon Cathedral three years later; and Francisco António de Almeida who was in Rome from 1722 and returned 1726 to become organist at the Royal Chapel.< (Note: Another, not a Seminary alumnus, was composer and violinist Romão Mazza who in 1733 at the age of 14 was funded by Queen Maria Anna to study in Naples.)

Later, a second bout received funding to study in Naples. These included: João de Sousa Carvalho, an alumnus of the Braganza ducal palace's Colégio dos Santos Reis at Vila Viçosa who went in 1761 and returned six years later where he taught counterpoint at the Seminary, composed and held other major positions, brothers Jerónimo Francisco de Lima and Bras Francisco de Lima, Joaquim de Santa Anna, Camilo [Camillo] Jorge Dias, and Cabral and José [Joze] de Almeida [Almeyda].

Marcos Portugal was organist and composer at the Patriarchate before receiving financial assistance, probably from Prince Regent John, to study in Italy. He was there from 1792 to 1800, and having established a good reputation as an opera composer, he returned to Lisbon to become music director of the newly built opera house, the Teatro Real de São Carlos. Many of his own operas were staged there.

== Seminary's continuation ==
=== Emergence of opera ===
Portrait of King Joseph I, c. 1770s, in the Palace of Venaria

John V died on 31 July 1750 after almost a decade of illness which began when he had a stroke in 1740, followed by a second in 1742 which left him hemiplegic and dependent on the care of others.

His health had never been stable and he had experienced repeated episodes of depression, so his response to this major crisis was to resort to religious devotion, even claiming after having received the Last Rites that he had made a full, miraculous recovery. However records of the period indicate that full use of the left side of his body was never restored and further illness finally led to his death. He was buried in the mausoleum of the House of Braganza at the Monastery of São Vicente de Fora. More relevant to this discussion, however, from the time of his first stroke he forbade all entertainment in the court and the wider community, bringing any development of opera in Lisbon to an end.

John V was succeeded by his son Joseph I.

Overall, music entertainment in the court had always been dull. This was a trial for Joseph's new wife Mariana Victoria who had spent some time in the more vibrant environment of the French court. In 1729, the same year as her marriage, she wrote in a letter to her mother, "I do what I can to relieve my melancholy, since you are so kind to want it thus, even though this is difficult in a country where there is no entertainment. My only one is singing, as I love music passionately. Lately we have gone out a lot, but only to churches ……"

Change was in sight because José's interest in opera was so strong that he managed to build in the Ribeira Palace library one of Europe's largest collections of opera scores, and before a year of his father's death had passed he was already recruiting Italian opera singers and others to establish a professional opera company within the court's structure. (Note: In the first instance, he had the Marquis of Pombal corresponding with their ambassador in Rome offering a contract to the castrato soprano singer Gioacchino Conti (nicknamed Gissiello in honour of his teacher Domenico Gizzi). The original offer was a joint posting to the Patriarchal and the Royal Chamber; but association with the Patriarchal was removed after protests from Conti. The bigger issue was about financial and other benefits, and despite Pombal's concern that the demands were exorbitant, in the end José had no hesitancy in offering Conti house, board and carriage as well as the right to leave after one year of service, and an unspecified sum of money. Other singers were approached at this time including German-born tenor Anton Raaff who sang in Lisbon for three years up to 1755.) Among several others, probably the most important of these was the Neapolitan-trained organist and composer, Davide Perez who in 1752 was appointed as mestre de capela at the Royal Chapel and music master to the royal princesses.

Within of that same year, he opened within the palace building a new theatre called the Teatro do Forte which he had created by converting the room in which foreign ambassadors had once been presented. A number of operas by Perez, Johann Adolph Hasse and others, and lighter works known as balli (Singular: ballo) (Note: Although a precursor of opera, and in the late Renaissance period preferred by many as more entertaining than the new form of music drama, by the early Baroque period, the ballo had become an extended form of instrumental and vocal music, often drawn into one work from several sources, and dance performed by professionals along with some characters played by members of the court in costume. The words "balli" and "ballet" share their derivation from the Greek word βαλλίζω (ballizo) ("to dance, to jump about"). (See Ballet)) and intermedi (Singular: intermedio). (Note: As with balli, intermedi developed during the Renaissance period, were often performed as a form of entertainment in their own right and sometimes as what has been described as a 'play within a play'. Their plot was often lightweight, and some had no plot but were used as a way of marking a special occasion, paying tribute to someone, not noting an historic event. By the mid-18th century, due to French influence, in some countries intermedi had become a form of ballet used to entertain audiences while sets were being changed between the acts of an opera.) Many of the singers were Italian and included those who were visiting Lisbon under contract or had moved there permanently, and others who were listed as "Virtuosi della Cappella Reale" (Virtuosos of the Royal Chapel) meaning members of the Patriarchal household including, potentially, staff and students from the Seminary.

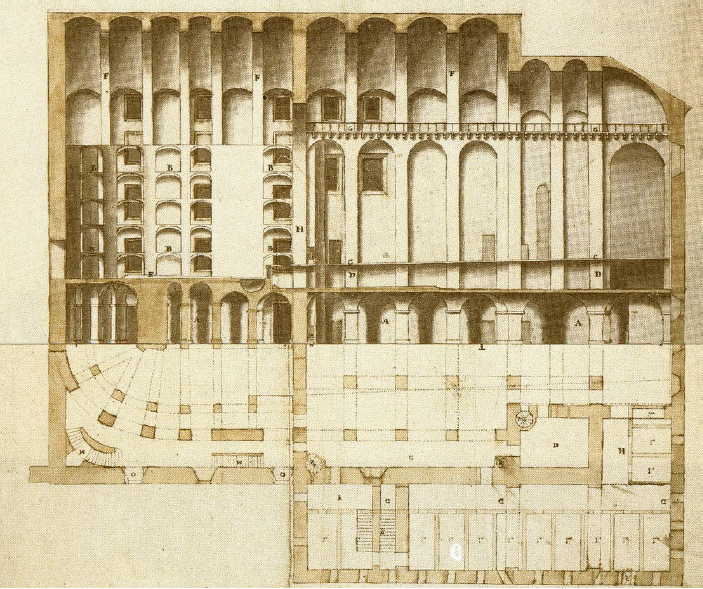
Illus: 10: Section drawing of the Tagus Opera, Ribeira Palace, Lisbon showing the relationship between the floor plan and the cross-section at the central long-way axis. Pen on paper work carried out in 1933 by Portuguese historian and art critic, José de Figueiredo (1872–1937).

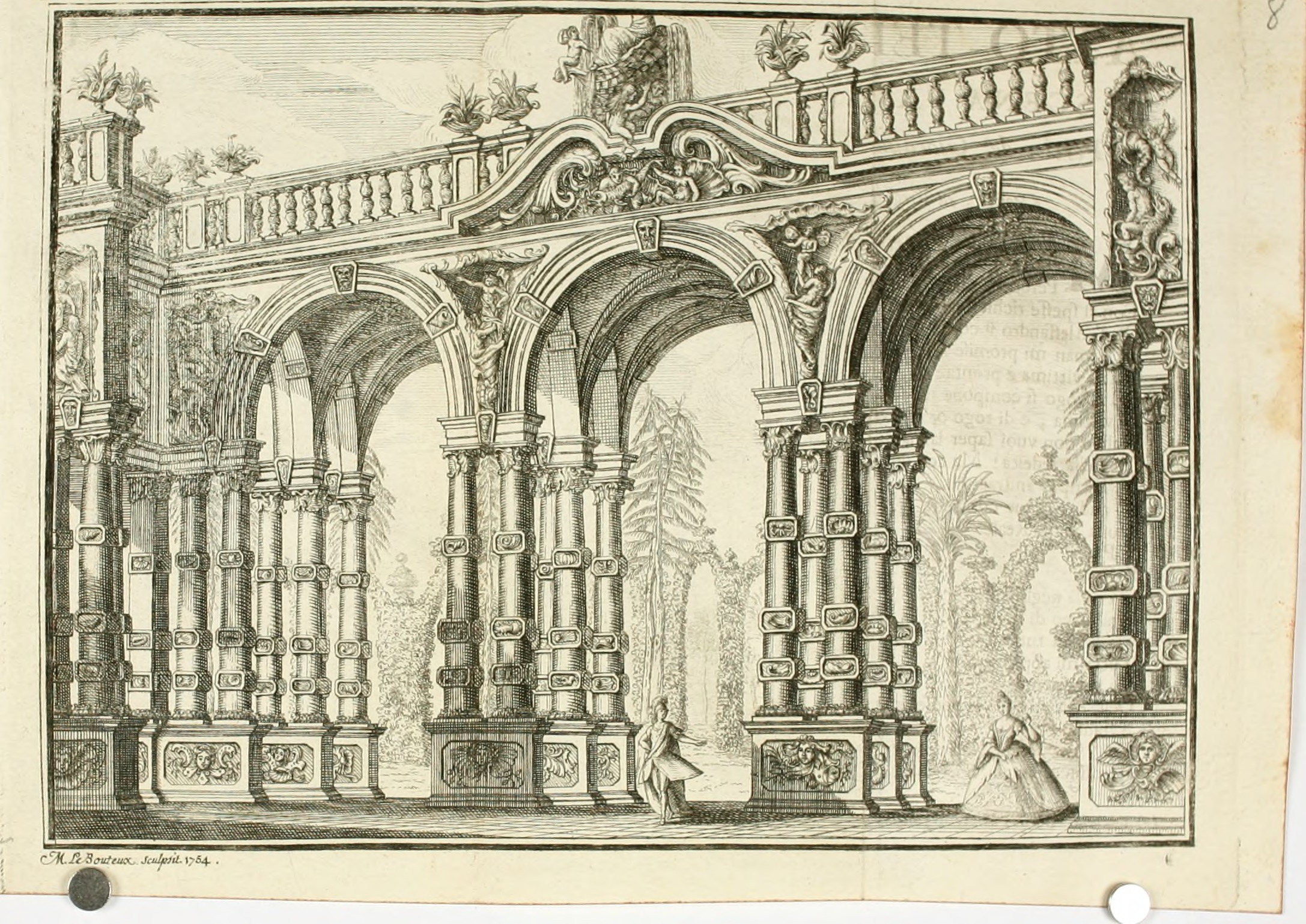
Opera set designed by Giovanni Carlo Galli da Bibbiena (1717–1760) for Alessandro nell'Indie by Davide Perez.

It is unclear what had aroused José's interest in opera because, while during his father's life special occasions such as birthdays and anniversaries had often been marked with the performance of so-called serenatas – works for one or more solo voices with instrumental ensemble, occasionally but not always including some form of semi-staging – the burgeoning level of interest in opera already seen in Italy, France, England, Austria and the Germanic States had not yet reached Portugal. While staged music performances including a small number of Italian operas had taken place in the court, they were of a more lightweight, comedic style generally classified as opera buffa (comic opera), whereas the opera seria (literally meaning "serious" opera but better understood as dramma per musica or melodramma serio) style, which had plots derived from mythology, heroism and historical tragedy, and had risen in favour elsewhere from about 1710 onwards, did not attract attention in the Portuguese court.

By contrast with José personal enthusiasm for opera, his interest in the functioning of the Patriarchate and the Seminary might have been little more than a formality. Indeed, in 1743, seven years prior to his father's death, his wife in correspondence with her mother had observed, "I think that if his Father happens to die, which God forbid, the face of things will change, for he himself does not love the Patriarchal so much."

José I's major step was his construction of an opera house as an extension of the Ribeira Palace. Known as the Ópera do Tejo (Tagus Opera) or Real Casa da Ópera (Royal Opera House), it was designed by Giovanni Carlo Galli da Bibbiena (1717–1760), seated 640, and opened to celebrate the Queen's birthday on 31 March 1755 with a production of Alessandro nell’Indie with the libretto by Pietro Metastasio and music by Davide Perez. (Note: After his introduction to this theatre while attending the opera, English music historian, musician and composer Charles Burney wrote: "But the new theatre … surpassed, in magnitude and decorations, all that modern times can boast. On this occasion Perez new fet the opera of Alessandro nell'Indie, in which opera a troop of horses appeared on the stage, with a Macedonian phalanx. One of the King's riding-masters rode Bucephalus, to a march which Perez composed in the Manege, to the grand pas of a beautiful horse; the whole far exceeding all that Farinelli had attempted to introduce in a grand theatre under his direction at Madrid, for the fitting out of which he had unlimited powers. Besides these splendid decorations, his Portuguese Majesty had assembled together the greatest singers then existing; so that the lyric productions of Perez had every advantage which a most captivating and perfect execution could give them.") There were more performances of that work, and between then and the end of October, a staging of Antonio Maria Mazzoni's La Clemenza di Tito and Perez's L'Olimpiade and L'Artaserse.

=== The "Terramoto" ===
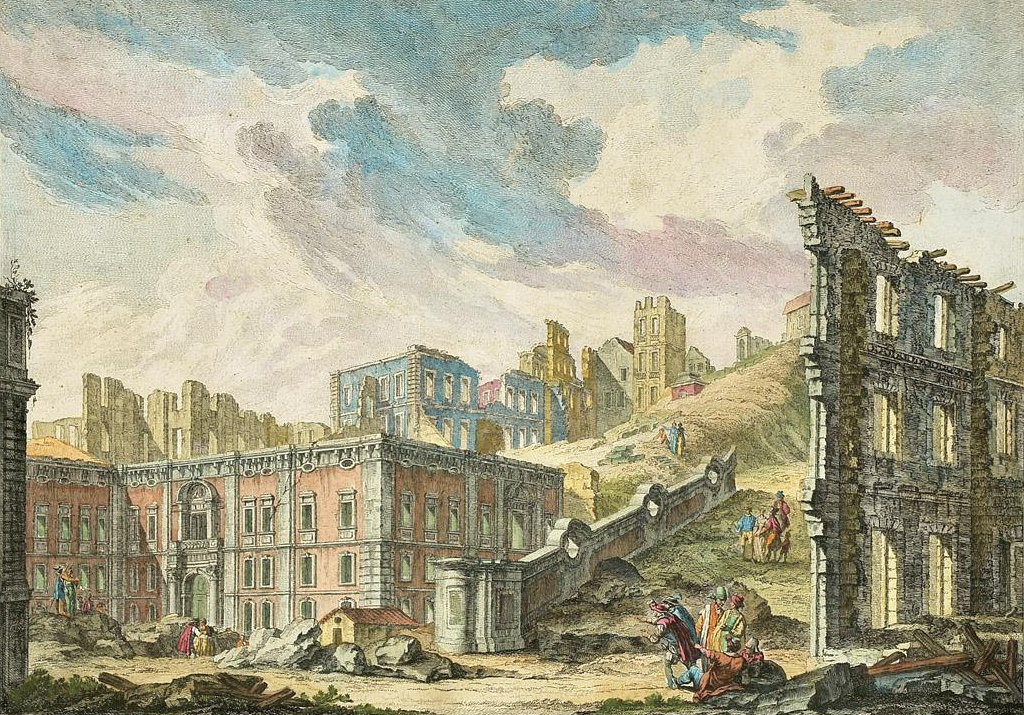
Ruins of the Patriarchal Church Square, following the 1755 Lisbon earthquake; coloured engraving by Jacques-Philippe Le Bas (1707–1783), made in 1757.

At 9.30 am on 1 November 1755, Lisbon was struck by a series of massive earthquake calculated to have been 8.5–9.0 on the moment magnitude scale (abbrev.: MMS, M_{w} or M). This was probably caused by a tectonic plate movement in what is called the Azores–Gibraltar Transform Fault which runs from the Atlantic Ocean through to the Gibraltar Straits, and the effects of its seismic action was registered in Spain, in north-west Africa, and even as far away as Scotland and Scandinavia. Evidence shows that most major public buildings and about 12,000 dwellings were destroyed or severely damaged and the death rate was high.

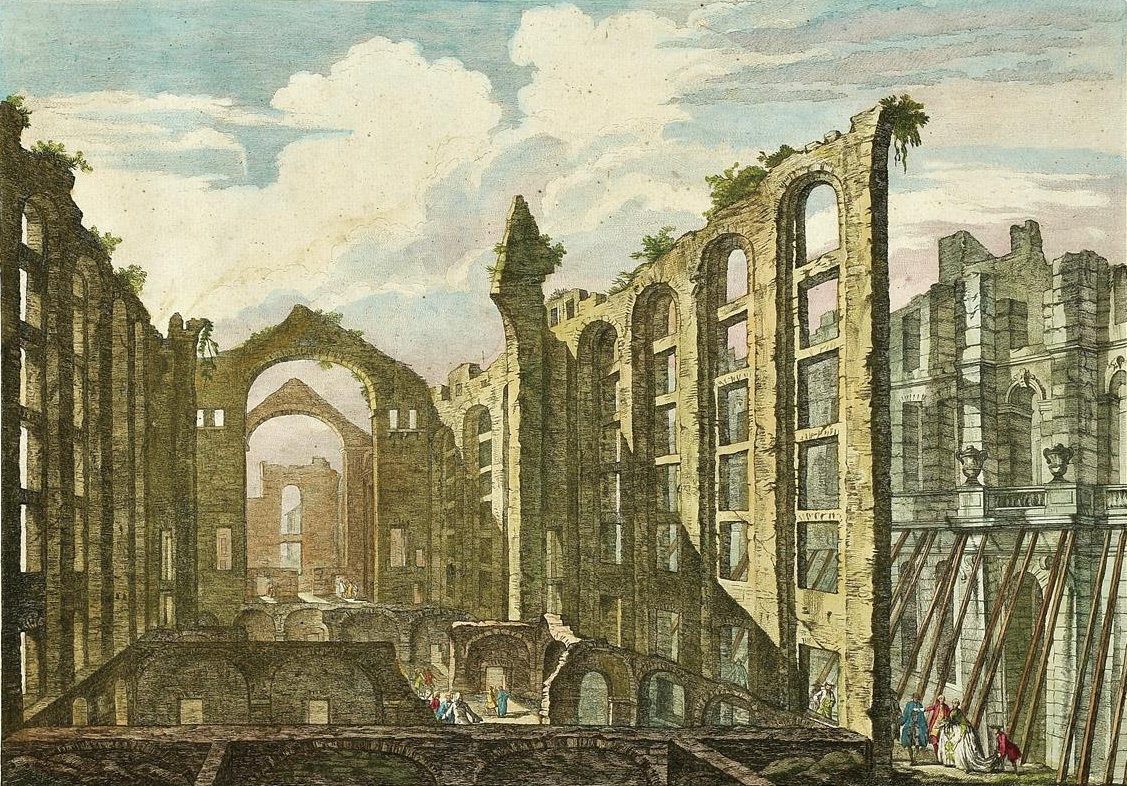
Ruins of the Ópera do Tejo, following the 1755 Lisbon earthquake; coloured engraving by Jacques Philippe Le Bas (1707–1783) made in 1757.

Because 1 November is All Saints' Day in the Western Church's Calendar, and being a holy day and therefore a public holiday in Portugal, the majority of people would have attended Mass and lit votive candles in church or at home. Many of the deaths would have occurred as church buildings collapsed on those within. Further disaster arose because the seismic movement shook candles onto the floor causing fires which quickly spread through the city.

About 40 minutes after the last of the quakes, seismic movement caused water in the Tagus River's mouth and the ocean first to sink away, revealing the shipwrecks and items that had been lost overboard, and then rise sending a tsunami rushing at speed towards the shore and along the Tagus River. At the height of 6 metres, (Note: Even more remarkably, the wave was 20 metres in height when it reached Cádiz in Spain, it affected the coastline of Algiers 685 kilometres to the east, and by ten hours time was in the Caribbean at the height of 4 metres.) the tsunami swamped the lower part of the city, laying everything in ruin including the Ribeira Palace, and taking with it virtually everything of importance including historical records, art works and items such as music scores. Two more waves followed.

The death rate in Lisbon and the area immediately around it has been variously stated as being as low as 10,000 and as high as 100,000. Noting a tendency to overstate these figures, working on available evidence, one modern researcher has estimated Lisbon's total death rate as between 30,000 and 40,000, and the combined total in Portugal, Spain and Morocco as between 40,000 and 50,000. Nevertheless, he describes the Lisbon event as "the largest ever-recorded natural catastrophe in Europe."

=== Outcomes for the Monarchy, Patriarchate and Seminary ===
==== The royal family and others retreat to the hills ====
Because it was a public holiday, the royal family attended Mass at the Ribeira Palace early and then left the city for Belém Palace. Belém itself was largely undamaged by the disaster, but the news of what had occurred in Lisbon left the king with claustrophobia and a distrust of being within buildings constructed of masonry. As a result, he refused to return to Lisbon, and he and the royal family lived in tents and wooden barracks while the king had a more permanent wooden structure erected at Ajuda.

The precursor of the grander Palace of Ajuda currently on the site, the first palace's structure was completed in 1761 and included a theatre and a chapel. (Note: There are many conflicting reports about the royal family's movements after the Terramoto. Preference is given here to an extensively researched paper written to mark its bicentenary in 1955 by British archaeologist and art historian T. D. Kendrick in which he says, "The King and the royal family were staying, when the earthquake happened, at a royal residence in Belém, but they moved at once into a suite of tents in an open space close at hand, and there they stayed for nine months until a big quadrangular wooden lodging, with twenty-five windows a side, had been erected for them on the Ajuda hill, north of Belém where the great stone palace, built in the early nineteenth century, now stands.")

The royal family was only one among many who relocated away from Lisbon's centre. It included not only those whose homes had been ruined or damaged, but many others who were dreading further earthquakes. Areas east and west of the city, Alto da Ajuda and the surrounding hills were all covered in tents for a long time while the city was being rebuilt. There were some, however, who preferred to remain and protect their properties. The poor had no available alternatives. Many priests and members of religious orders decided to remain so they could help care for those in need and bury the dead.

==== Survival of the Patriarchate and Seminary ====
The second patriarch José Manuel da Câmara de Atalaia's location during the Terramoto is unknown. However, he survived and as Fernandes shows, the Patriarchate's location in the following 37 years changed frequently:

"Initially it operated in the Hermitage of São Joaquim and Santa Ana (adjoining the Palace of the Marquesses of Abrantes in Alcantara), later to occupy a proper church at the site of the Cotovia (today the Praça do Príncipe Real) that would end up being destroyed by a fire (1756–1769); the Church of S. Roque (1769); the Church of the Convent of S. Bento (1769–1772) and the Church of S. Vicente de Fora (1772–1792). In 1792, the Patriarchate and the Seminary were reunited in the Royal Chapel (in Ajuda), and thus the ideal of Dom Joao V was restored."

It can be assumed that the patriarch continued to have some working role in the king's household because, as Fernandes points out, the Chapel Royal at Ajuda was "the legitimating pillar of the monarchy"; but the picture is vague and, given the king's disinterest in any close involvement in government and his attitude towards the patriarchal structure, it seems unlikely that the patriarch himself would have been providing more than the chapel's formal rituals and the close working relationship between the monarch and the patriarch as originally envisaged by John V, already collapsing after this king's death, was even further eroded by the earthquake.

The location of the Seminarists during the earthquake has not been determined; however, the Patriarchate's records show that in January 1756 the tailor, José da Costa Lage made new clothes for twelve boys, "Martilliano Gomes [Pereira], Anacleto Pinheiro, José de Almeida, Jerónimo Francisco de Lima, José Pinheiro, Luiz Francisco, Maximo Joaquim [Rufino], Pedro Nicolao Monteiro, José Joaquim [dos Santos], José Rodrigues and Joaquim da Santa Ana."

The money for this expenditure came from the Patriarchate in response to an appeal sent on 22 November 1755 by the Rector, Francisco Gonçalves Dias. By this time the Seminary had taken temporary residence in a house in Rua de São Bento, probably on the higher level where less damage had been caused by the "Terramoto". Further appeals asked for funding to cover more clothing, bedding, school supplies and sheet music, reflecting the fact that very little could have survived in the old premises. An inventory taken in August 1756 shows the Seminary as having only one harpsichord and one clavichord. In April 1757, Nicolau Ribeiro Passo Vedro, the only music master mentioned in documents of the time, appealed to the Patriarchate for money to provide more instruments, furniture and more teaching space. As Fernandes points out, Vedro's letter makes it clear that the Seminary has both internal and external students. The Patriarchate responded in May providing funds for several new instruments including a positive organ all of which were ordered from Lisbon-based instrumentmakers.

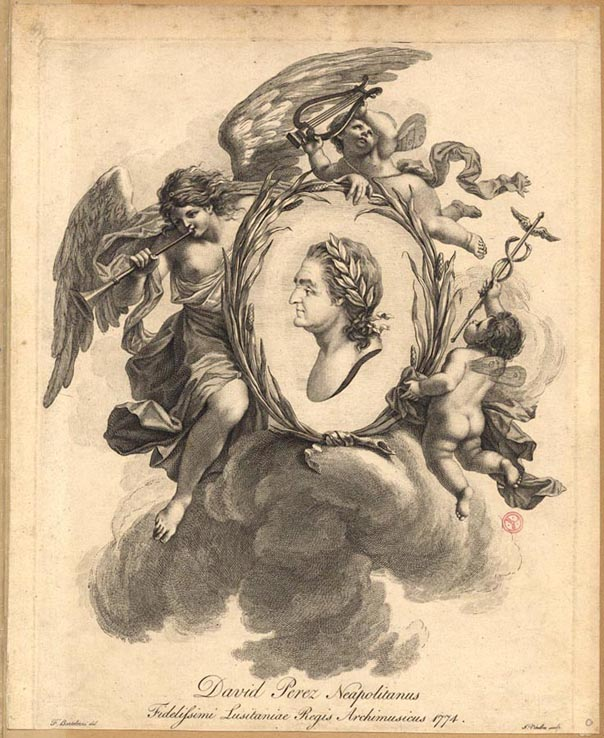
Davide Perez. Copper engraving by Giovanni Vitalba (1738–1792) after a drawing by Francesco Bartolozzi (1725–1815). Dated between 1774 and 1780. Collection of the Biblioteca Nacional de Portugal.

One point to note is that, following the "Terramoto", Davide Perez, whose operas were performed in the new opera house, joined the Seminary's teaching staff where his background as a Neapolitan-trained composer had marked effects on the composing style of his students. He also concentrated much on writing sacred music including many major works which are now receiving frequent performance. His opera output also continued, the last being written in 1777, the year before his death. However, after the "Terramoto" the staging of these works only took place outside Portugal.

Next for the Seminary came a move to better premises in Rua dos Cardaes, where it remained for three years until relocating in 1759 on order from the patriarch to the former Novitiate of Cotovia which became vacant after Pombal had ejected the Jesuits from Portugal. The Patriarchate had already been located there since 1756 and the newly built Patriarchal Church had been opened in 1757. So the arrival of the Seminary would have been beneficial to the overall operation of the household.

The Seminary's circumstances were to change again, however, because in 1761, on instruction from Pombal, a Royal College of Nobles (Portuguese: Real Colégio dos Nobres) was founded to educate aristocratic boys aged 7 to 13 prior to university. The college was given use of the novitiate building and the Seminary was relocated to the newly restored St Francis de Borja Hospice (Portuguese: Hospício de São Francisco de Borja), another former Jesuit site a few streets from the Cotovia. Evidence shows that its last location prior to its move to Ajuda in 1792 was in the Calçada da Graça, close to the then Patriarchal Church of S. Vicente de Fora.

In summary, Fernandes has described the period in this way:

"Several musicians linked to the royal housel abandoned Lisbon in the aftermath of the earthquake, but in the 1760s, a number of singers (Italian and Portuguese) similar to the previous period had already been gathered in the Ajuda Royal Chapel and the Patriarchal. Contrary to the number of church dignitaries, drastically reduced in the reign of Jose I by the pressure of the Marques of Pombal, the music scene at the Patriarchal arrived in some periods by the second half of 17th century to have a hundred musicians and to absorb between 20 and 25 percent of the allowances being paid by the institution. In the reign of Maria I and during the regency of the future John VI, the Royal Patriarchal of Ajuda simultaneously used for some time more than 90 singers, 12 organists and several composers. The importation of Italian singers with high salaries continued until the departure of the royal family to Brazil in 1807. At the same time, the Royal Patriarchal Seminary guaranteed the formation of a considerable number of Portuguese musicians and several children of Italian musicians hired and born in Lisbon, having followed for more than a century the golden moments and the vicissitudes of the Patriarchal and the Royal Chapels."

==== Reconstruction of Lisbon ====
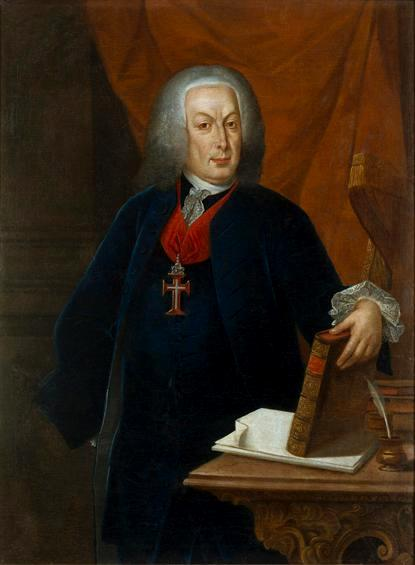
Portrait of the Marquis of Pombal by an unknown artist of the Portuguese school. Collection of the Museu Francisco Tavares Proença Júnior, Castelo Branco.

During his upbringing, José I received no preparation for the role of monarchy and after ascending to the throne lacked any desire to be involved in the everyday operation of government. From 1750, onwards he dealt with this by delegating power to the hands of his Secretary of the State of Internal Affairs of the Kingdom, then known as Sebastião José de Carvalho e Melo. In a way, he was all but the king's "regent", lacking only princely status. Holding this privileged position, Pombal showed himself, on the one hand, to be highly organised, influential, scientific and inventive, but, on the other, dictatorial, authoritarian and arrogant with a propensity to rid himself of anyone who opposed him and with whom he disagreed. (Note: To some analysts, Pombal's attitudes, ideas and policies appear to have been formed through exposure to Enlightenment principles while working as a diplomat in Vienna and London, of which his opposition to church dogma and his anti-clerical views were good examples. However, as an aristocrat, he demonstrated tolerance towards the concept of monarchy and was prepared to work under the authority of the king in governing Portugal. Some scholars use the term Enlightened absolutism or enlightened despotism" in reference to Pombal's style.)

His rebuilding of Lisbon (including the grid plan alignment of its streets), the designing of a timber-framed, earthquake-resistant house, changes in architectural style by doing away with the prevailing Baroque taste and introducing the simpler Neo-Classical approach (hence the use of the phrase Pombaline style to describe its use in Lisbon), the reconstruction of Portugal's economy, the ejections of the Jesuits from Portugal, educational reform including the secularisation of the education system, the suppression of the Inquisition, the abolition of slavery, and so on were among his great achievements.

Although his action towards the Inquisition was largely driven by his anti-clerical attitude, he continued to use it, with his brother Paulo António de Carvalho e Mendonça as Inquisitor-General, as a way of imposing his political power. For example, the Jesuit priest Gabriel Malagrida who was interpreting the "Terramoto" as God's punishment was imprisoned, tried by the Inquisition, finally found guilty of heresy and publicly executed. Likewise with strong opponents of Pombal, the Távora family from which the king was having an affair with the Marchioness Leonor. The dispute came to a head when an attempted assassination of the king occurred as he returned to Ajuda from the Távora house. Following this, the entire family was tried and sentenced to death while the crown confiscated all their property.

For his handling of the Tavora case, the king granted him the title of Count of Oeiras (Portuguese: Conde de Oeiras) and in 1777 he was elevated to the title by which he is best known, Marquis of Pombal (Portuguese: Marquês de Pombal).

In the face of Pombal's anti-clericalism and his reform of the education system, it is surprising that the patriarchal budget was never reduced and even that the Patriarchate and Seminary both continued to exist.

=== Preface to the decline of Portugal ===
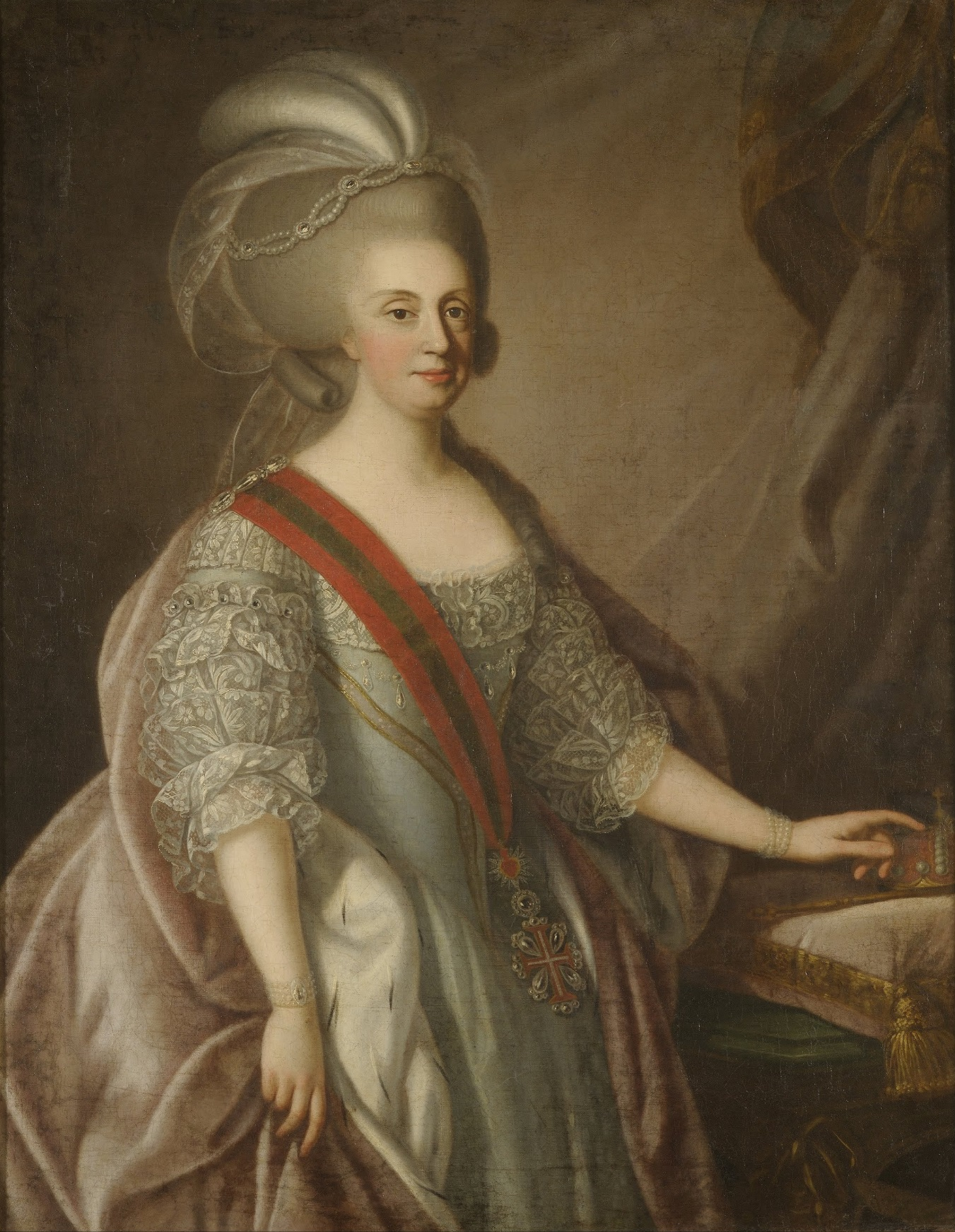
Portrait of Queen Maria I of Portugal dated 1783 and attributed either to Thomas Hickey (1741–1824) or Giuseppe Troni (1739–1810). Collection of the Palace of Queluz.

Joseph I died on 24 February 1777 and was succeeded by his daughter Maria I who was married to her uncle Infante Peter, the son of her grandfather John V and therefore her father's younger brother. When she ascended to the throne he took the title of king jure uxoris under the name Peter III, but he was never co-regent with her and, like his brother, had no great interest in being involved in government.

One of Maria I's earliest actions was to remove Pombal from office because of her intense dislike of him. There were several reasons for this. One was a response against his anti-clericalism and especially his decision to expel Jesuits from Portugal. Another was that, despite the fact that the assassination attempt on her father had probably occurred because of his sexual relation with the Marchioness of Távora, Pombal's treatment of the family had alienated the aristocracy and the queen took their side. A third was that, because papal approval had been necessary for her to marry her uncle and her father had instructed Pombal to conduct the negotiations, Pombal himself was opposed to the marriage on moral grounds and had tried to persuade her father not to proceed.

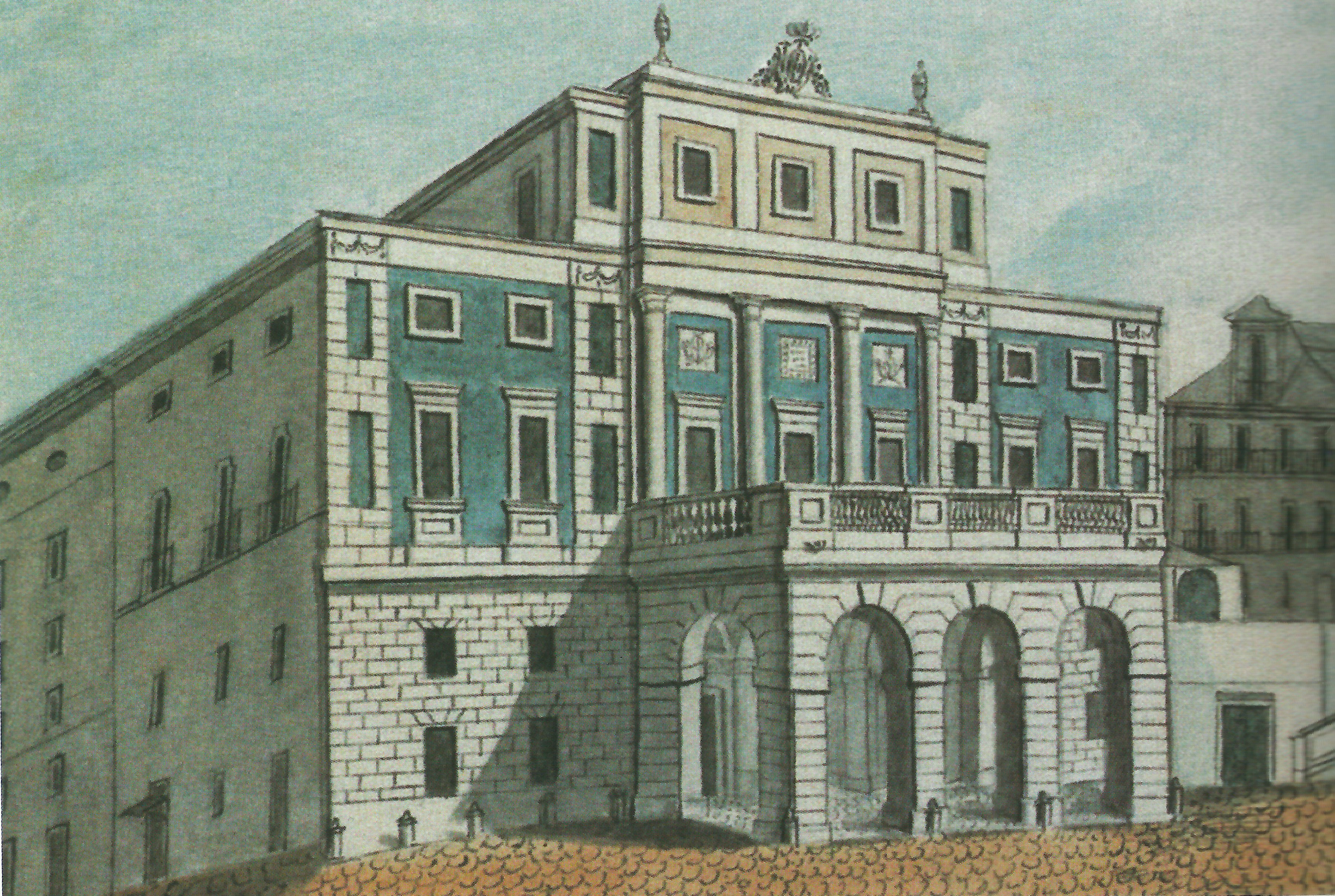
Theatro Real de São Carlos (Royal Theatre of St. Charles); anonymous coloured engraving made c. 1800.

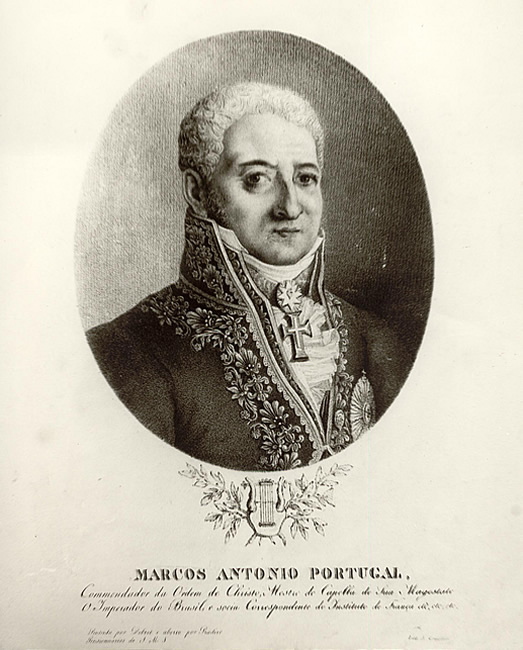
Marcos Portugal; engraving by Charles-Simon Pradier (1786–1847) based on a painting by Jean-Baptiste Debret (1768–1848). Before 1848.

A major event for Lisbon was the opening by Mary 1 of a new opera house on 30 July 1793. Called the Theatro Real de São Carlos (St. Charles Royal Theatre), named in honour of Carlota Joaquina of Spain who had been married in 1785 at the age of 10 to the queen's son João and began residing with him in 1790 once she was of childbearing age.

Construction came about after a group of Lisbon's businessmen, who had made their money through Pombal's economic reforms, recognised that the destruction of the Tejo Opera House had left a gap in the city's music life, and they provided the entire funds for the new theatre from their own resources. The first opera staged there was Domenico Cimarosa's La Ballerina Amante, and in 1800 the Seminary's alumnus, Marcos Portugal was appointed as its director, enabling him to perform many of his own operas along with major works from wider Europe.

Maria I was often called "The Pious" (Portuguese: a Piedosa) in Portugal and "The Mad" (Portuguese: a Louca) in Brazil, both reflecting aspects of her mental illness, signs of which emerged quite early in her life indicating a major depressive disorder which also affected her sisters, Maria Ana Francisca and Maria Doroteia. Her symptoms amplified over time, and becoming more acute when her husband died in 1786, her elder son José, Prince of Brazil died of smallpox in 1788 and her confessor died in 1791. From 1786 she forbad all entertainment in the court, retreated more and more frequently to her chambers, and in February 1792 she was declared insane. From that time, her son and heir apparent João, later to be king as John VI after his mother's death, governed on her behalf but resisted becoming Prince Regent until 1799. He, too, had a mental illness, most likely depression.

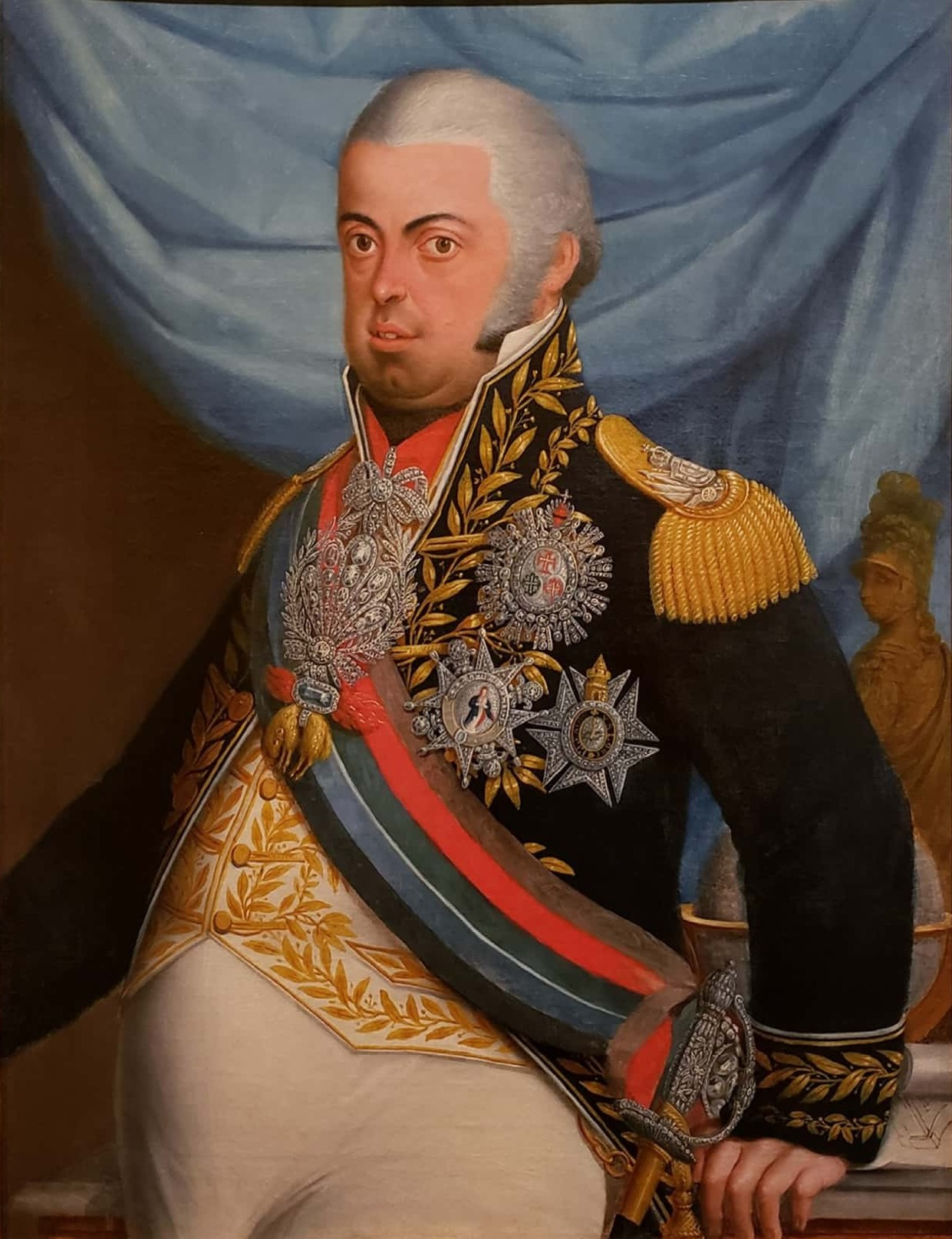
Portrait of King John VI, by José Leandro de Carvalho (c. 1770–1834), in the collections of the Brazilian Historic and Geographic Institute, Rio de Janeiro

Because the Palace of Ajuda was her father's residence, Maria I and her husband had chosen to live in the Palace of Queluz where they raised their children. After her father's death, they remained there and the Palace of Ajuda was largely ignored. In 1794, the old wooden palace except the library and chapel were destroyed by fire and João decided to have it replaced by a more permanent neo-Classical building. Construction started in 1795, continued in dribs and drabs right through to the late 19th century, and the palace was not used as a royal residence until 1862. The building itself was never completed according to its original design.

As mentioned earlier, by 1792 both the Patriarchate and the Seminary were located at Ajuda; but with the royal family living elsewhere, the working relationship between the Patriarchate and the royal family is unclear. Nevertheless, music continued to be written by members of the teaching staff for court events, and the Seminary continued its role with Seminarists and external students as before.

=== French invasion and defeat ===
Portugal's monarchy was driven into exile in Brazil by the French invasion which began early in 1807 and climaxed with the fall of Lisbon in November of that same year. On 29 November, a few days before the French troops marched into the capital, the royal family together with around 15,000 other Portuguese set sail for Brazil. This was a major blow for the Seminary and between then and 1815 it took no enrolments.

France's repeated invasion of Portugal, three in all, came to a final end with their defeat in 1811 when combined British and Portuguese forces were able to drive the French army across the border into Spain where the war continued until 1814.

The following year, João, still Prince Regent (because his mother Maria I was alive), and still living in Brazil, had the Seminary revived. It took in its first new students in 1816.

Even after France's withdrawal from Portugal, the royal court remained in Brazil. Maria I died on 20 March 1816 and her son succeeded her as John VI, king of the United Kingdom of Portugal, Brazil and the Algarves, a structure he had established the year before in which Brazil and Portugal were of equal status. The royal family's long absence from Portugal created a climate of civil and political unrest, growing dissatisfaction with the model of monarchy and an urge for social reform. Support increased in many Portuguese cities and towns, and a climax came in 1820 when a military insurrection occurred in Porto.

=== King returns to unrest ===
In response, John VI was forced to return from Brazil, leaving his son and heir-apparent Peter first as regent and then as its first emperor following the declaration of Brazil's independence from Portugal on 7 September 1822.

But even before his arrival in Lisbon in 1821, new electoral laws had been introduced the previous year and the country's first election held in December 1820 had led to the establishment of the 110-member Cortes Gerais e Extraordinárias da Nação Portuguesa (General Extraordinary and Constituent Cortes of the Portuguese Nation). The Constitution which was completed in 1822 introduced many changes including the replacement of the old absolutist monarchical structure with a constitutional monarchy, the curtailing of the power previously held by the aristocracy and the church, and a reconstruction of the country's economy. The king decided to live within the Constitution, at least for the time being as future events revealed.

It quickly emerged, though, that the king's presence in Portugal had done nothing to assuage the debate, and the liberal constitutionalists and absolutist monarchists remained at loggerheads about how they wanted the country to be ruled. Even within the royal household, the king's position was eroded by having a wife and queen, Carlota Joaquina who conspired to have him abdicate, and their second surviving son, Miguel (Michael) whom she supported in his pro-absolutist campaign. Twice, Miguel rose against his father, the second time resulting in the king sending him into exile. (Note: The first was by leading an armed insurrection, commonly called the Vilafrancada, from 27 May 1823 in Vila Franca de Xira to which the king finally travelled and overpowered Miguel and his supporters. The king then promoted Miguel to the rank of the Army, abolished the Constitution, dissolved the Cortes, and imprisoned or exiled liberals who protested. The second and more serious event, now known as the Abrilada came about when Miguel concocted a story about a plot to assassinate the king, had those alleged to be involved arrested, and took his father into what was falsely called "protective custody." Foreign diplomats heard about the king's imprisonment and succeeded in removing him. After that, in addition to his being removed as Commander-in-Chief, his three years in exile began.) As if not enough, the king also abolished the Constitution and dissolved the Cortes, re-establishing the monarchy's former absolute power.

=== Where for the Seminary? ===
Despite the king's support for it, the Seminary's future remained uncertain. José Barba Alando de Menezes, who had been appointed as its Inspector (Superintendent) in 1818, attempted to strengthen its position by reviewing its rules and conditions of operation.

In similar manner, after his return from Brazil, the king gave instructions for the Seminary to be reformed. The results emerged in a decree dated 3 November 1824 which created it as an Estabelicimento régio de utilidade pública (royal institute for public use) funded from the Patriarchal budget at the rate of 400,000 réis per month. The number of Seminarists was set as 20 each with 6 years to complete their studies. If a boy's voice changed while still a student, the Statutes said he could study an instrument for two more years as an external student, for which he would receive a pension of 240 réis per day.

While external students had been enrolling in the old Seminary for many years, their education at that time being viewed as peripheral to the institution's primary purpose to train singers and musicians for the court and Patriarchate, the new Statutes gave special emphasis to this new role and led to significant changes in the syllabus. (Note: Fernandes quotes the 1824 Statutes as saying "todos os Mestres de Múzica darão Aula de tarde em beneficio do bem comum, aos alunos externos, que se tiverem matriculado" (all Masters of Music will give the afternoon class for the benefit of the common good of external students who have enrolled), even affirming the directive further by naming masters in specific areas, ""Masters of Vocal Music, Piano, Organ and Counterpoint", or by the "Masters of Instrumental Music"".)

In fact, probably the most important reform to emerge from the 1824 Statutes was that the new syllabus included studies in string and wind instruments and piano. Fernandes points out that the 'institutionalisation' of studying these instruments was significant because, in the past, they had been learned in the home or with private teachers. Furthermore, the emergence of the piano as a discrete area of study, independent of both the harpsichord and the organ which were viewed as interchangeable, showed how the keyboard instruments and their use were evolving.

The enrollment of castrati remained in place because, "despite being already obsolete at the time" (Note: Use of the word "obsolete" reflects the fact that public taste and social attitudes were already changing at this time. But it was not until almost four decades later (1861) that castration was made illegal in Italy, and it took until 1878 for Pope Leo XIII to ban the hiring of castrati in the church. The only castrato ever recorded was Alessandro Moreschi, a member of the Sistine Chapel choir who was castrated around 1865 and died in 1922.), the sound had a particular appeal to the king because of his lifetime experience, and in the same way he had employed castrati in Brazil, he made sure they were appointed to the Royal Chapel and Patriarchal choirs after his return to Lisbon in 1821.

By contrast with the earlier model where students were viewed as being trained specifically for the Royal Chapel and the Patriarchate and their career paths largely subject to the king's direction, the new Statutes widened the possibilities. So while alumni could be appointed to vacant positions in the Royal Chapel and patriarchal church choirs or favoured over other applicants whenever vacancies occurred on the Seminary's teaching staff, they were also free to take positions elsewhere.

== Seminary's closure ==
=== Turbulence in the court and the country ===
John VI died on 10 March 1826, the cause being arsenic poisoning as confirmed in 1990 by forensic investigation. There followed one of the most unstable periods in recent Portuguese history, both for the monarchy and the country as a whole, and it was driven as much by division in the wider community as it was by fraction in the royal family.

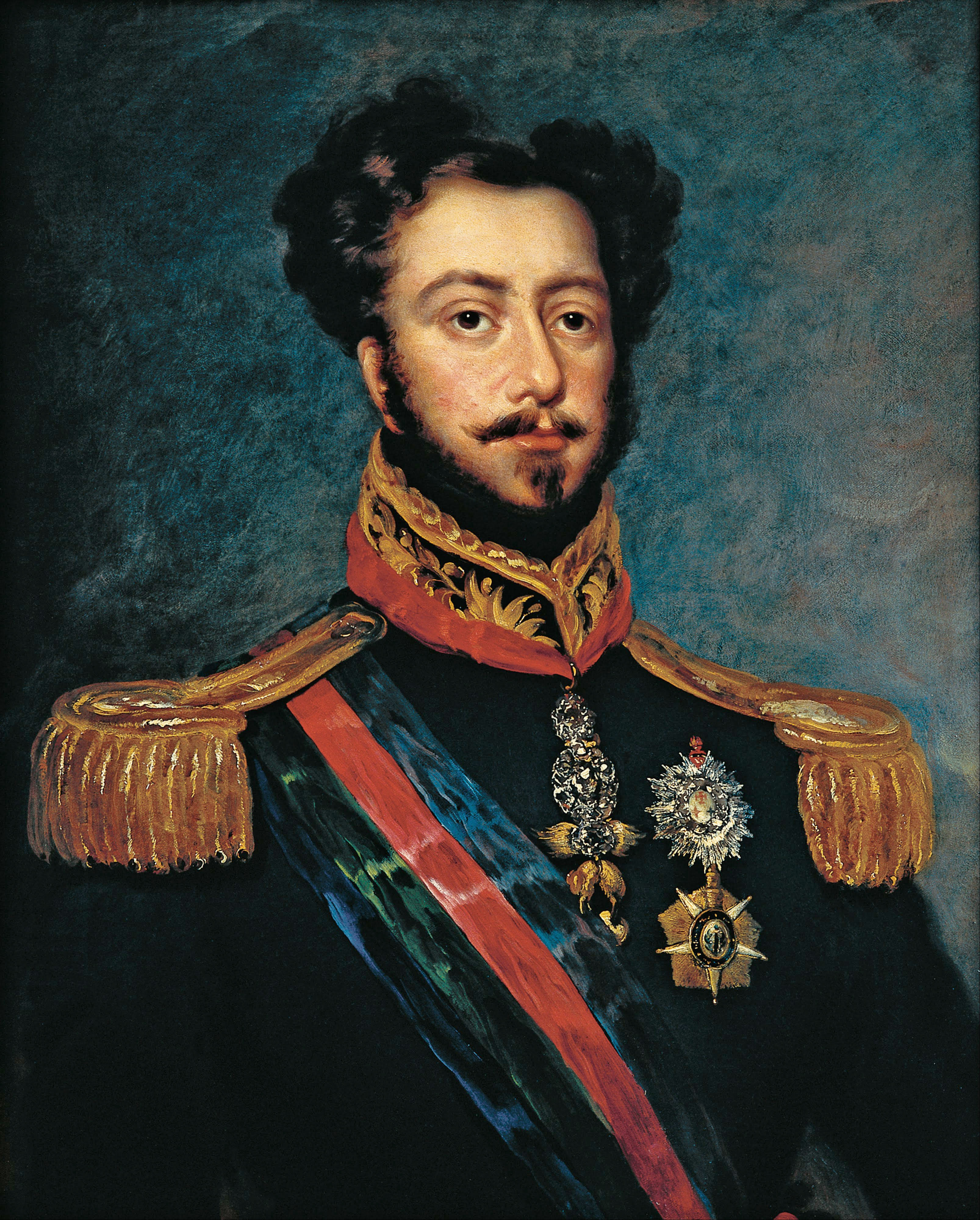
King Peter IV of Portugal, 1st Emperor of Brazil, 1834, after John Simpson; in the collections of the Pinacoteca do Estado de São Paulo, São Paulo

As far as the monarchy was concerned, the blame from the outset lay largely on the now-gone king because, prior to his death, he had already designated his daughter Isabel Maria to act as regent until "the legitimate heir returned to the kingdom", at the same time not specifying the name of which son was to be the "legitimate" heir. Many regarded his first son, Peter I of Brazil as having that right, and in effect, Pedro became the next monarch as Peter IV.

But because Brazil itself wanted to retain its separation from Portugal, he promptly abdicated and named his daughter Princess Maria da Glória as Portugal's monarch, with added conditions that she would marry her uncle, Miguel, that he would accept the new Constitutional Charter as Pedro himself had already done, and that he would act as regent until Maria reached the age of majority. Miguel agreed to fulfill all these conditions, at least as he led others to believe, At the time, Maria was only seven years old and Isabel Maria remained as regent for two years.

The question about the type of government desired by Portugal's population remained a divisive issue capable of stirring up vigorous debate and even bloodshed. Was it to be an absolutist monarchy as it had been under several generations of the Braganza household; or should the power of the monarch be kept in balance by adopting a constitutional monarchical approach, as had recently been tested, where the occupant of the throne was answerable under a constitution to an elected body representing the people?

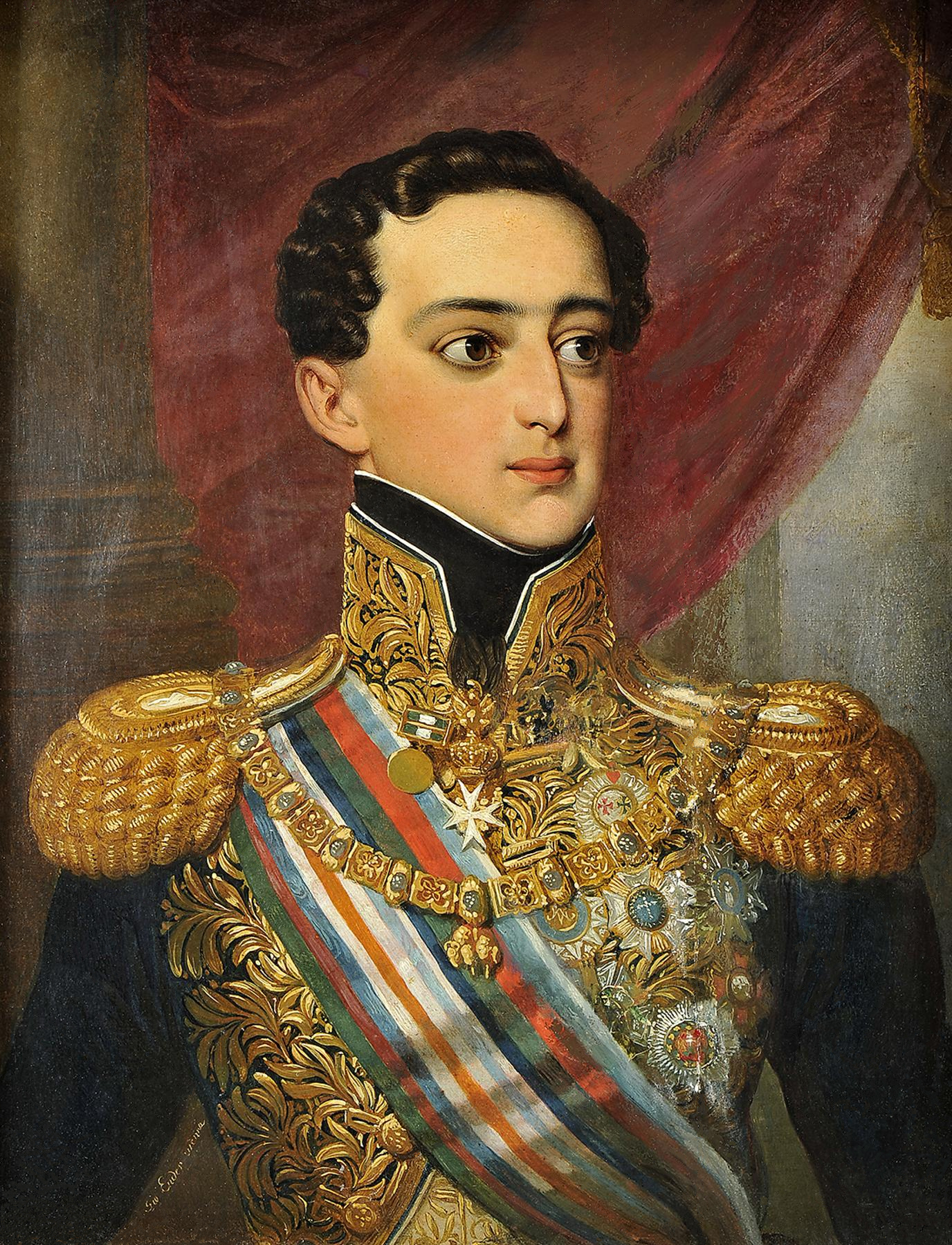
Miguel I, King of Portugal, c. 1827, by Johann Nepomuk Ender (1793–1854); in the collections of the Palace of Queluz.

As it turned out, the holding of the monarchy would be unstable in itself because, although Maria da Glória's reign as Maria II began on 2 May 1826, political and civil unrest on various issues and the regent, Isabel Maria's poor health led to a decree being issued to Miguel in May 1827 asking him to return and take on the role of regent. Miguel agreed to fulfil all these conditions, at least as he led others to believe, But on his return to Lisbon on 22 February 1828, with widespread celebrations, the cheers were, "Viva o Senhor D. Miguel I nosso rei absoluto" (Long live the Lord D. Miguel, our Absolute King). In the same year, the queen was taken away from Portugal, travelling to various countries and not returning to Lisbon until 1833.

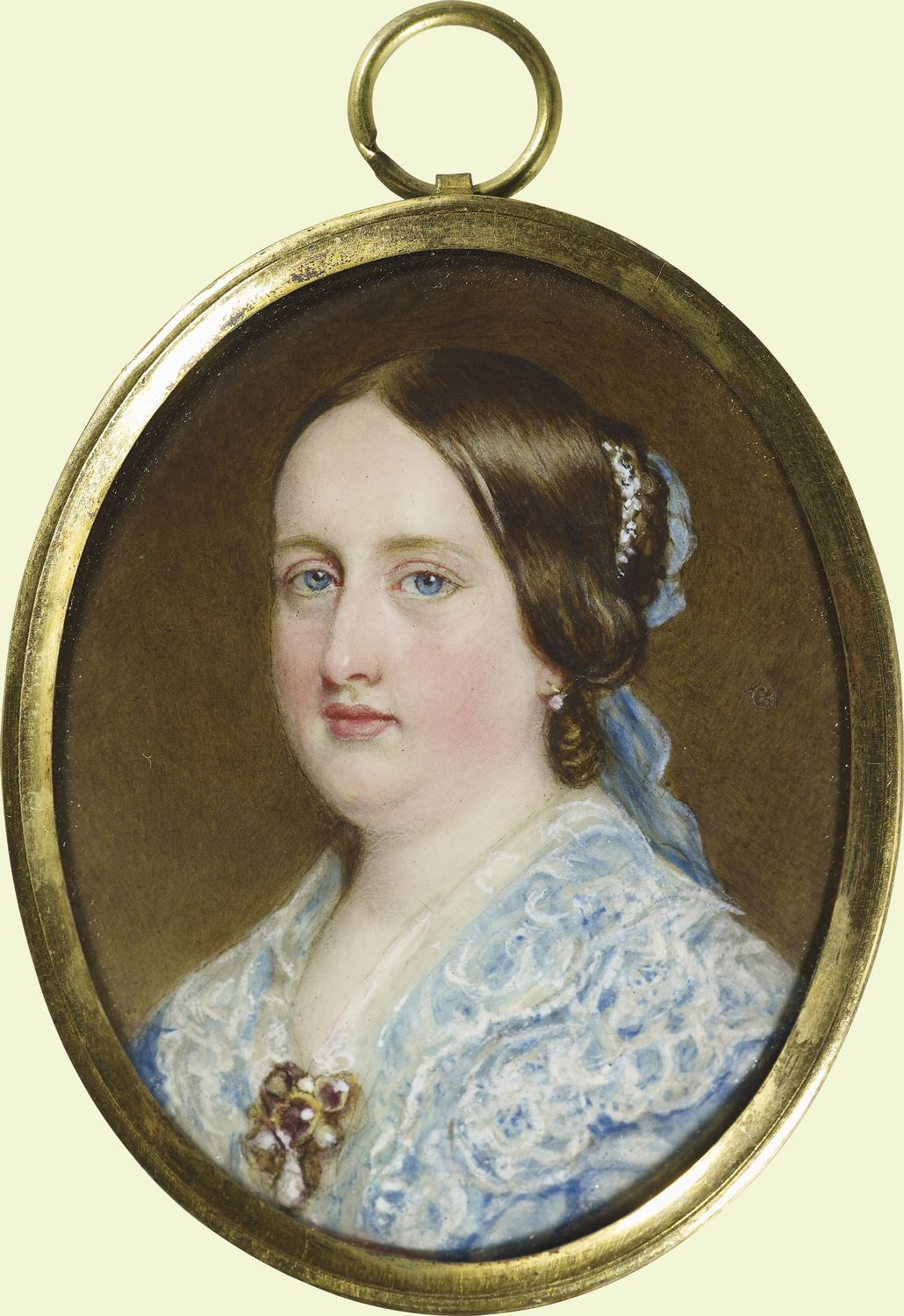
Maria II, Queen of Portugal (1819–1853). Signed and dated 1853. Enamel on gold. Painted by William Essex (1784–1869) after the miniature by William Ross (1794–1860) painted in Lisbon in 1852. Royal Collection Trust.

With the absolutist movement having gained the upper hand, at least in Lisbon and among the higher ranks elsewhere, and with the support of his mother, Carlota Joaquina, Miguel set out to become king in his own right. After clearing liberal moderates from the court and the upper ranks in the army, he asserted his claim and on 7 July 1828 Miguel was acclaimed as king. The following year he disbanded the Cortes, refusing to hold another election as the Constitutional Charter required, assembling instead, on advice from Pedro, a Three Estates Cortes which declared a restoration of his absolutist power before being disbanded.

That was not the end of the problem, but the beginning of another, represented by the six-year Miguelite War in which opposition to Miguel and his absolutist supporters finally succeeded. He formally abdicated on 26 May 1834 and passed into permanent exile. In the same year, Maria da Glória became of age and was acclaimed again as queen with her father Pedro as her regent. He died a few months later and her reign continued until 15 November 1853.

=== End and beginning ===
The Seminary's history had bridged the same evolution of social order which had already been faced by other nations and illustrated here by comparing John V's absolutist monarchical model with the constitutional monarchy which emerged during the reign of Maria II. The new structure of government saw the Seminary no longer relevant to the monarchy as it had been when it and the Patriarchate had first been set up.

On 4 February 1834 Pedro as regent issued a decree abolishing the old Patriarchate and all institutions associated with it including the Seminary. At the same time, its former association with the crown and court ended and the patriarch was reassigned solely to his role as Archbishop of Lisbon with the associated role as Metropolitan of Extremadura, and Lisbon Cathedral became the location of his throne. Through to 1837 further decrees were issued to clarify the function and operation of the Patriarchate, one of which required that all its assets, except those which had been associated with the archdiocese prior to the Patriarchate's establishment, be transferred into the national assets.

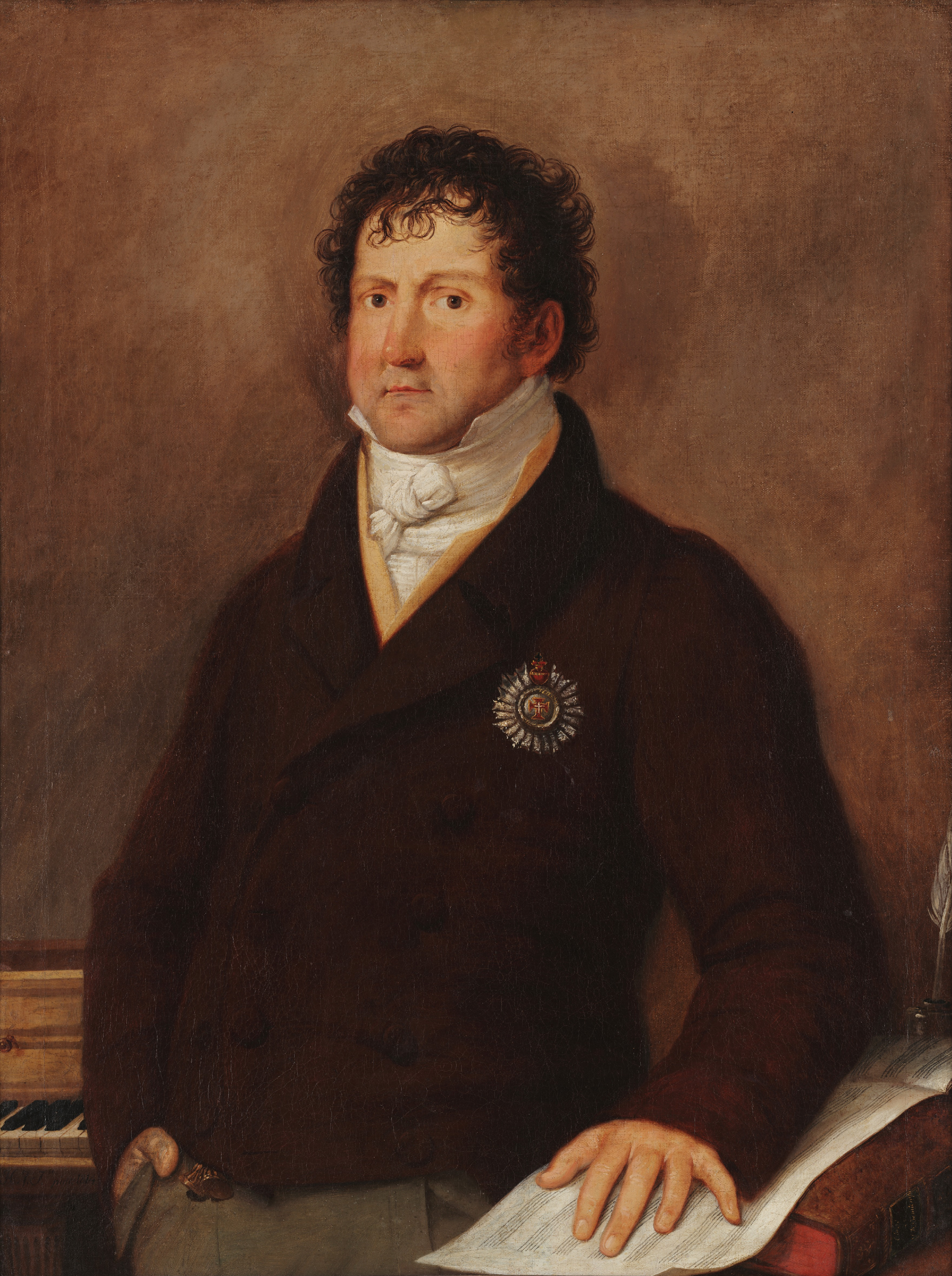
Pianist, composer and teacher João Domingos Bomtempo (1814). Artist Henrique José da Silva. From the collection of the Museu Nacional da Música.

Education reform came to a head in 1834–1835 when a program was set up to make it available to all members of the public and free of charge to anyone who wished to attend, and the Seminary's demise fitted well with a new concept of music education that had been devised by Seminary alumnus and former court musician, João Domingos Bomtempo.

Instead of following the path of others to Italy, Bomtempo had decided to move to Paris from where he quickly built a good reputation as a composer and pianist throughout Europe. By the time he returned to Lisbon in 1822, he had already decided that Portugal's music in general and music education in particular were in need of renewal and reform.

One of his first projects was to set up an organisation called the Sociedade Filarmónica de Concertos (Philharmonic Concerts Society) which, like the London societies on which it was modelled, had its own orchestra and put effort into buildings its audiences and performing standard and new repertoire. He also taught piano to Maria da Glória, the implication being that he was well known within the court.

At the same time, based on his experience of music institutions in Paris, London, Germany and elsewhere, he began to draw up proposals for restructuring the Seminary. Although the precise content of his earliest proposal is not known, it is clear how Bomtempo influenced the Seminary's reform in 1824. His experience outside Portugal became clear when the new conservatory was founded because its structure and syllabus were similar to those of the Paris Conservatoire.

As already stated, the Seminary had ceased to exist in early 1834 and a decree issued on 5 May 1835 established the new conservatory under the name Conservatório de Música (Conservatory of Music), and Bomtempo was appointed as director. By contrast with the old Seminary, teaching and administration in the conservatory was carried out entirely by lay people, yet another indicator of how the church's influence and involvement in education was being eradicated. A number of teachers from the old Seminary were taken onto the new staff.

On 15 November 1836, at the suggestion of poet, dramatist, politician and diplomat, João Baptista de Almeida Garrett, three schools, Conservatório de Música, the Escola Dramática ou de Declamação responsible for drama education, and the Escola de Dança, Mímica e Ginástica Especial teaching dance, mime arts and advanced gymnastics were absorbed into one body, the Conservatório Geral de Arte Dramática (General Conservatory of Dramatic Art).

== Alumni – Selective list ==
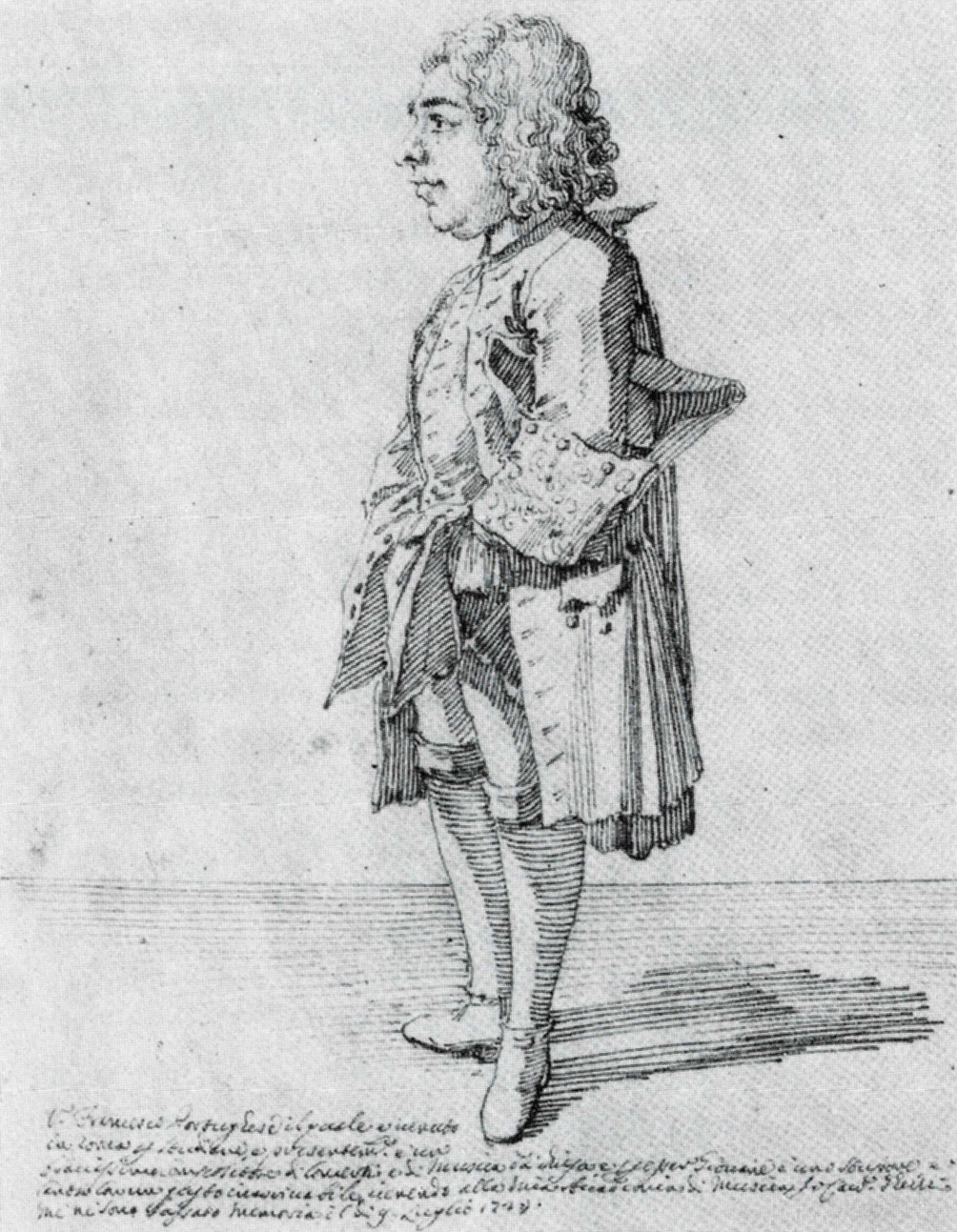
Posthumous portrait of José António Carlos Seixas, 1742, drawn by Vieira Lusitano (1699–1783) and engraved by Jean Daullé (1703–1763)

- Almeida [Almeyda], Francisco António de (c. 1702–c. 1755?)
- Almeida [Almeyda], José [Joze] de (c.1738–?)
- Baldi, João José (1770–1816)
- Bomtempo, João Domingos (1775–1842)
- Cabral, Camillo [Camilo] Jorge Dias (c. 1749–c. 1805)
- Costa, João Evangelista Pereira da (c. 1798–1832)
- Esteves, João Rodrigues (c. 1700–c. 1751)
- Gomes, André da Silva (1752–1844)
- Lima, Brás [Braz] Francisco de (?–1813)
- Lima, Jerónimo [Jeronymo] Francisco de (1743–1822)
- Louzado, Vicente Miguel (c. 1750–1831)
- Marra, André Cipriano (1767–?)
- Martins, Domingos (c. 1747/48–?)
- Mattias, José (c. 1750/51 –?)
- Mazziotti, João Paulo [Giovanni] (1786?–1850)
- Migone, Francisco Xavier (1811–1861)
- Mixelim [Mixilim; Mexelim; Mexilim], Joaquim do Vale [Valle]
- Moreira, António Leal (1758–1819)
- Mosca, José [Joze] Alves [Álvares] (c. 1750/51–?)
- Mosca, Manoel Alves [Álvares] (1747/48–1818)
- Neves, Joaõ Pirez [Pires] (Miranda, c. 1733–?)
- Oliveira, Joaquim de (1748-49–after 1806)
- Oliveira, Joze Rodrigues de (c. 1740–1806)
- Portugal [Portogallo], Marcos [Marco] António (da Fonseca) (1762–1830)
- Portugal, Simão Victorino (1774–1845)
- Rego, António José do (fl. 1783–182?)
- Santos, Jorge Augusto Cesar dos (? –1897)
- Santos, José Joaquim dos (1747?–1801)
- Santos, Luciano Xavier dos (1734–1808)
- Seixas [Seyxas], José Antonio Carlos de (1704–1742)
- Silva, José Maria da (?–?)
- Silva, José de Santa Rita Marques e (c. 1780–1816)
- Soares, António José (1783–1865)
- Teixeira, António (1707–1774)

== Teaching and administrative staff – Selective list ==
- Baldi, João José (1770–1816)
- Cabral, Camillo [Camilo] Jorge Dias (c. 1749–c. 1805)
- Carvalho, João de Sousa
- Durante, Victorio (?–1777)
- Esteves, João Rodrigues (c. 1700–c. 1751)
- Giordani [Jordani], João.
- Giorgi, Giovanni (?–1762)
- Leal, Eleutério Franco (c. 1758–c. 1840)
- Lima, Brás [Braz] Francisco de (?–1813)
- Lima, Jerónimo [Jeronymo] Francisco de (1743–1822)
- Mazziotti, Fortunato António (1782–1855)
- Menezes, José Joaquim Barba Alando de
- Moreira, António Leal (1758–1819)
- Oliveira, José do Espirito Santo e
- Perez [Peres], David [Davide]
- Portugal [Portogallo], Marcos [Marco] António (da Fonseca) (1762–1830)
- Santos, José Joaquim dos (1747?–1801)
- Silva, José de Santa Rita Marques e (c. 1780–1816)
- Soares, António José (1783–1865)
- Teixeira, António (1707–1774)
- Vedro, Nicolau [Nicolao] Ribeiro Passo (?–1803)

== Recommended reading ==
- Cristina Fernandes. Boa voz de tiple, sciencia de música e prendas de acompanhamento. O Real Seminário da Patriarcal (1713–1834) (Good treble voice, music science and accompanying gifts. The Royal Seminary of the Patriarchal (1713–1834)). Biblioteca Nacional de Portugal, 2013. The only comprehensive examination of the Seminary's history and operation. In Portuguese – no translation is available. Access by payment of a fee through the Biblioteca Nacional de Portugal.

== Bibliography ==
=== The Court, the Patriarch and the Seminary ===
- Álvarez, Gonzalo, Román Vilas, Francisco C Ceballos, Hélder Carvalhal and Timothy J Peters. "Inbreeding in the last ruling dynasty of Portugal: The house of Braganza." American Journal of Human Biology, December 2014. Uploaded to ResearchGate 27 July 2018, 2018;e23210. DOI: 10.1002/ajhb.23210. (in English) Accessed 5 January 2019.
- Biblioteca Nacional de Portugal. Estatutos do Real Seminario da S[ant]a Igreja Patriarchal. – Ajuda 23 de Agosto de 1764 (Statutes of the Royal Seminary of the Patriarchal Church. – Ajuda 23 August 1764). . Retrieved 8 August 2018.
- ___. Real Seminario da Patriarcal (Lisboa), Livro que hade servir p[ar]a os acentos das adimiçoins dos Siminaristas deste Real Siminario na forma dos seus Estatutos 1748–1820 (Royal Seminary of the Patriarchal (Lisbon), a book that will record an account of Seminarians' admission to this Royal Seminary according to its Statutes 1748–1820). . Retrieved 8 August 2018.
- Dicionário Biográfico Caravelas (Caravelas Biographical Dictionary). Edited by David Cranmer and others. Caravelas – Núcleo de Estudos da Historia da Música Luso-Brasileira (Caravelas – Center for Studies on the History of Luso-Brazilian Music). Centro de Estudos de Sociologia e Estética Musical (Centre for the Study of the Sociology and Aesthetics of Music) (CESEM). . Retrieved 27 September 2018. ISBN 989-97732-2-0.
- Clemente, Manuel José Macário do Nascimento. Notas históricas sobre o Tricentenário do Patriarcado de Lisboa (Historical notes on the Tercentenary of the Patriarchate of Lisbon). Patriarcado de Lisboa, 2016. . Retrieved 6 August 2018.
- ___. No Curso dos Tempos (In the Course of Time). Patriarcado de Lisboa, 2016. . Retrieved 9 August 2018.
- Correia, Maria Helena. "A Música na época de D. João V" (The Music in the time of Dom João V). Instituto de Cultura e Língua Portuguesa (ICALP): Revista, Vols. 20 & 21, July–October 1990, pp. 129–140. . Retrieved 9 November 2018.
- d'Alvarenga, João Pedro. "‘To make of Lisbon a new Rome': The repertory of the Patriarchal Church in the 1720s and 1730s." Cambridge University Press: Eighteenth Century Music, Vol. 8/2, September 2011. pp. 179–214. Published online 25 July 2011. . Retrieved 29 September 2018.
- Fernandes, Cristina. "As Práticas Devocionais Luso-brasileiras no Final do Antigo Regime: o Repertório Musical das Novenas, Trezenas e Setenários na Capela Real e Patriarcal de Lisboa" (The Luso-Brazilian Devotional Practices at the End of the Ancien Régime: The Musical Repertoire of Novenas, Trezenas and Setenários in the Royal and Patriarchal Chapel of Lisbon). Revista Música Hodie, Vol. 14/2, 2014. pp. 213–231. . Retrieved 28 September 2018. ISSN 1676-3939.
- ___. Boa voz de tiple, sciencia de música e prendas de acompanhamento. O Real Seminário da Patriarcal (1713–1834) (Good tiple voice, music science and accompanying gifts. The Royal Seminary of the Patriarchal (1713–1834)). Biblioteca Nacional de Portugal, 2013. . Retrieved 7 August 2018.
- ___. Houve uma escola de música onde hoje está o Museu de História Natural (There was a music school in what is now the Natural History Museum). . Retrieved 5 August 2018.
- Januário, Pedro Miguel Gomes, Maria Jo‹o Pereira Neto and Mário Say Ming Kong. Unveiling a heritage through digital enlightenment: the Lisbon Royal Opera House of Tagus. Paper presented at the XIII Forum Internazionale Le Vie dei Mercanti, Avera, Capri, 11–13 June 2015. La Scuola di Pitagora, 2015. . Retrieved 6 December 2018.
- Peters, Timothy, and Clive Willis. "Maria I of Portugal: Another royal psychiatric patient of Francis Willis." British Journal of Psychiatry, Vol. 203/3, September 2013. p. 167. . Retrieved 25 September 2018.
- Ribeiro, Ana Isabel. "The Use of Religion in the Ceremonies and Rituals of Political Power (Portugal, 16th to 18th Centuries)." Religion, Ritual and mythology. Aspects of Identity Formation in Europe, edited by Joaquim Ramos de Carvalho. Pisa University Press, 2006. pp. 265–274. . Retrieved 18 August 2018.

=== Portuguese Music ===
- Alegria, José Augusto de. "História da Capela e Colégio dos Santos Reis de Vila Viçosa" (History of the Chapel and School of the Epiphany at Vila Viçosa). Fundação Calouste Gulbenkian, 1983. ISBN 9726660157.
- Augustin, Kristina. A trajetória dos castrati nos teatros da corte de Lisboa (séc. XVIII) (The trajectory of the castrati in the court theaters of Lisbon (18th century)). . Retrieved 15 October 2018.
- ___. Os castrati e a prática vocal no espaço luso-brasileiro (1752–1822) (The castrati and vocal practice in the Luso-Brazilian context (1752–1822)). PhD thesis submitted to the Universidade de Aveiro, 2013. . Retrieved 16 October 2018.
- Brito, Manuel Carlos de. Opera in Portugal in the Eighteenth Century. Cambridge University Press, 1989. ISBN 978-0-521-35312-0.
- ___. "Portugal and Brazil." The Cambridge Companion to Eighteenth-Century Opera, edited by Anthony R. DelDonna and Pierpaolo Polzonetti. Cambridge University Press, 2009. pp. 233–243. ISBN 978-0-521-69538-1.
- Christovam, Ozório and Diósnio Neto. A relação musical entre Lisboa e Nápoles durante o século XVIII (The musical relationship between Lisbon and Naples during the 18th century). (2013). Conference paper from II Jornada Discente do Programa de Pós Graduação em Música da ECA-USP, 2013. . Retrieved 14 August 2018.
- Dicionário Biográfico Caravelas, edited by David Cranmer et al. Centro de Estudos da Sociologia e Estética Musical (CESM), Faculdade de Ciências Socais e Humanas, Universidade Nova de Lisboa. Dicionário Biográfico Caravelas. Retrieved 27 September 2018. ISBN 989-97732-2-0.
- Dottori, Maurício. The Church Music of Davide Perez and Niccolò Jommelli, with special emphasis on funeral music. DeArtes – UFPR, 2008. ISBN 978-85-98826-19-6.
- Fernandes, Cristina. "Il dotto e rispettabile Don Giovanni Giorgi", illustre maestro e compositore nel panorama musicale portoghese del Settecento" (The learned and respectable Don Giovanni Giorgi", an illustrious teacher and composer in the Portuguese musical scene of the eighteenth century). Rivista italaliana de musicologica (Italian Journal of Musicology'), Vol. 47, 2012, p. 157–203. Giovanni Giorgio. Retrieved 1 November 2018.
- ___. Também houve castrati portugueses (There were also Portuguese castrati). . Retrieved 10 August 2018.
- Machado, Ana Catarina. Manifestações Musicais como Forma de Representação Social. A Música na Gazeta de Lisboa (Musical Manifestations as a Form of Social Representation. The Music in the Gazeta de Lisboa). Dissertation carried out towards a master's degree in History and Heritage, University of Porto, September 2017. . Retrieved 10 August 2018.
- Rees, Owen. "The History of Music in Portugal." Early Music, Vol. 24/3, 1996. pp. 500–503. JSTOR. . Retrieved 6 August 2018.
- Stevenson, Robert. "Lisbon: I. To 1870." The Grove Dictionary of Music and Musicians, edited by Stanley Sadie. Macmillan Publishing, 1980. Vol. 11, pp. 24–25. ISBN 0-333-23111-2.
- ___. "Portugal: I. Art Music." The Grove Dictionary of Music and Musicians, edited by Stanley Sadie. Macmillan Publishing, 1980. Vol. 15, pp. 139–141. ISBN 0-333-23111-2.
- Vasconcellos, Joaquim de. Os músicos portuguezes: biographia – bibliographia (The Portuguese musicians: Biographia – bibliographia). Vol. 1, Imprensa portugueza, 1870.. Retrieved 20 September 2018.
- ___. Os músicos portuguezes: biographia – bibliographia (The Portuguese musicians: Biographia – bibliographia). Vol. 2, Imprensa portugueza, 1870. . Retrieved 19 September 2018.
- Vieira, Ernesto. Diccionario biographico de músicos portuguezes: historia e bibliographia da música em Portugal (Biographical Dictionary of Portuguese Musicians: History and Bibliography of Music in Portugal). Vols. 1 & 2. Mattos Moreira & Pinheiro, 1900. Facsimile of the original edition digitized by Google from the library of Harvard University, . Retrieved 2 November 2018.
- Vilão, Rui César. History of the Portuguese music: An overview. 20 August–2 September 2000. European School of High-Energy Physics (CERN) and the University of Coimbra, 2001. pp. 277–286. DOI = 10.5170/CERN-2001-003.277. Retrieved 26 September 2018.

=== Music in general ===
- Augustin, Kristian. Os Castrati: a prática da castração para fins musicais (The Castrati: the practice of castration for musical purposes). . Retrieved 4 November 2018.
- Benedetto, Renato di. "Naples: 4. 17th and 18th Centuries: The Neapolitan School." The Grove Dictionary of Music and Musicians, edited by Stanley Sadie. Macmillan Publishing, 1980. Vol. 13, pp. 24–29. ISBN 0-333-23111-2.
- Buelow, George J. A History of Baroque Music. Indiana University Press, 2004. ISBN 978-0-253-34365-9.
- Cafiero, Rosa. "Conservatories and the Neapolitan School: a European model by the end of the 18th century?" Music Education in Europe (1770–1914): Compositional, Institutional and Political Challenges, Vol. I, edited by Michael Fend and Michel Noiray. BWV Berlin Wisenschafts-Verlag, 2005. pp. 15–29. . Retrieved 28 August 2018.
- Crawford, Catherine. Eunuchs and Castrati: Disability and Normativity in Early Modern Europe. Routledge, 2019. ISBN 1-351-16636-0.

=== History, society and culture ===
- Andrade, António Alberto Banha de. Vernei e a cultura do seu tempo (Vernei and the culture of our time). Imprensa de Coimbra, 1965. . Retrieved 28 September 2018. ISBN 989-8661-59-3.
- Beales, Derek. Prosperity and Plunder: European Catholic Monasteries in the Age of Revolution, 1650–1815. Cambridge University Press, 2003. ISBN 978-0-521-59090-7.
- Beloff, Max. The Age of Absolutism 1660–1815. 2nd ed., Routledge Revivals, 2014. ISBN 0-415-73661-7
- Costa, Leonor Freire, Nuno Palma and Jaime Reis. "The great escape? The contribution of the empire to Portugal's economic growth, 1500–1800". European Review of Economic History, Vol. 19/1. Oxford Academic, 1 February 2015, Pages 1–22. . Retrieved 4 December 2018. . Retrieved 4 December 2018. ISSN 1361-4916.
- Fernandes, Lidia, Rita Fragoso and Carlos Cabral Loureiro. "Entre o Teatro Romano e a Sé de Lisboa: evolução urbanística e marcos arquitectönicos da antiguidade à reconstrução pombalina" (Between the Roman Theater and the Lisbon Cathedral: urban evolution and architectural landmarks from antiquity to the reconstruction of Pombal). Estudos de Lisboa, No. 11, edited by Pedro Flor. Instituto de História da Arte, Faculdade de Ciências Sociais e Humanas, Universidade Nova de Lisboa, 2014. pp. 27–29. . Retrieved 30 August 2018.
- Gomes, Marleide da Mota, Rubens Reimão and Péricles Maranhão-Filho. "Morte de Dom João VI: convulsões e coma" (Dom João VI's death: convulsions and coma). Arquivos de Neuro-Psiquiatria, Vol.65/4b, December 2007. . Retrieved 23 October 2018. Print version ISSN 0004-282X. . Retrieved 23 October 2018. On-line version ISSN 1678-4227.
- Hanson, Carl A. Economy and Society in Baroque Portugal 1668–1703. Macmillan, 1981. ISBN 1-349-05880-7.
- Livermore, Harold Victor. A new history of Portugal. 2nd ed., Cambridge University Press, 1969. ISBN 0-521-09571-9.
- Martinho, Bruno A. O Paço da Ribeira nas Vésperas do Terramoto. Master dissertation in History of Art, Universidade Nova de Lisboa, 2009. . Retrieved 7 August 2018.
- Mullins, John R. The reconstruction of Lisbon following the earthquake of 1755: a study in despotic planning. The Journal of the International History of City Planning Association, Vol. 45, 1992 . Retrieved 10 December 2018.
- Murteira, Helena, Alexandra Gago da Câmara, Paulo Simões Rodrigues and Luís Sequeira. Lost Cities as a Virtual Experience: The Example of Pre-Earthquake Lisbon. University of Évora – Centre for Art History and Artistic Research (CHAIA), Lisbon Open University, and University of Trás-os-Montes and Alto Douro. . Retrieved 4 December 2018. . Retrieved 7 December 2018.
- Ribeiro, José Silvestre. História dos estabelecimentos scientificos litterarios e artisticos de Portugal nos successivos reinados da monarchia (History of scientific, literary and artistic establishments of Portugal in the successive reigns of monarchs). Vol. 6. Academia real das sciencias, 1876. . Retrieved 1 September 2018.
