= Jerónimo Francisco de Lima =

Composer

Jerónimo Francisco de Lima (Lisbon, September 30, 1743 - February 19, 1822) was a Portuguese composer. He wrote a number of operas, which were performed in Lisbon. Among his other compositions are a number of sacred works, including a Dixit Dominus and a Magnificat for four voices with basso continuo.
