= Miguel António do Amaral =

Portuguese painter

- Born: 1710
- Died: 1780 (aged 69–70)
- Patrons: Joseph I of Portugal; Maria I of Portugal; José, Prince of Brazil

Miguel António do Amaral (1710–1780) was a Portuguese court painter to the House of Braganza, progressing in the years from the household of King Joseph I of Portugal to that of Queen Maria I of Portugal and finally to the household of José, Prince of Brazil.

== 1773 Commission ==
In 1773, Amaral was commissioned by Joseph I of Portugal to make two sets of portraits featuring the King and his wife, Mariana Victoria of Spain. After the completion of his grandfather's set of portraits in mid-1773, José, Prince of Beira ordered a similar commission by Amaral. However, he also asked for a second portrait of José, for his mother, Maria I of Portugal. These works would gain Amaral incredible fame throughout Portugal and Europe as an able portrait painter, having done five incredibly detailed and large portraits in one year.

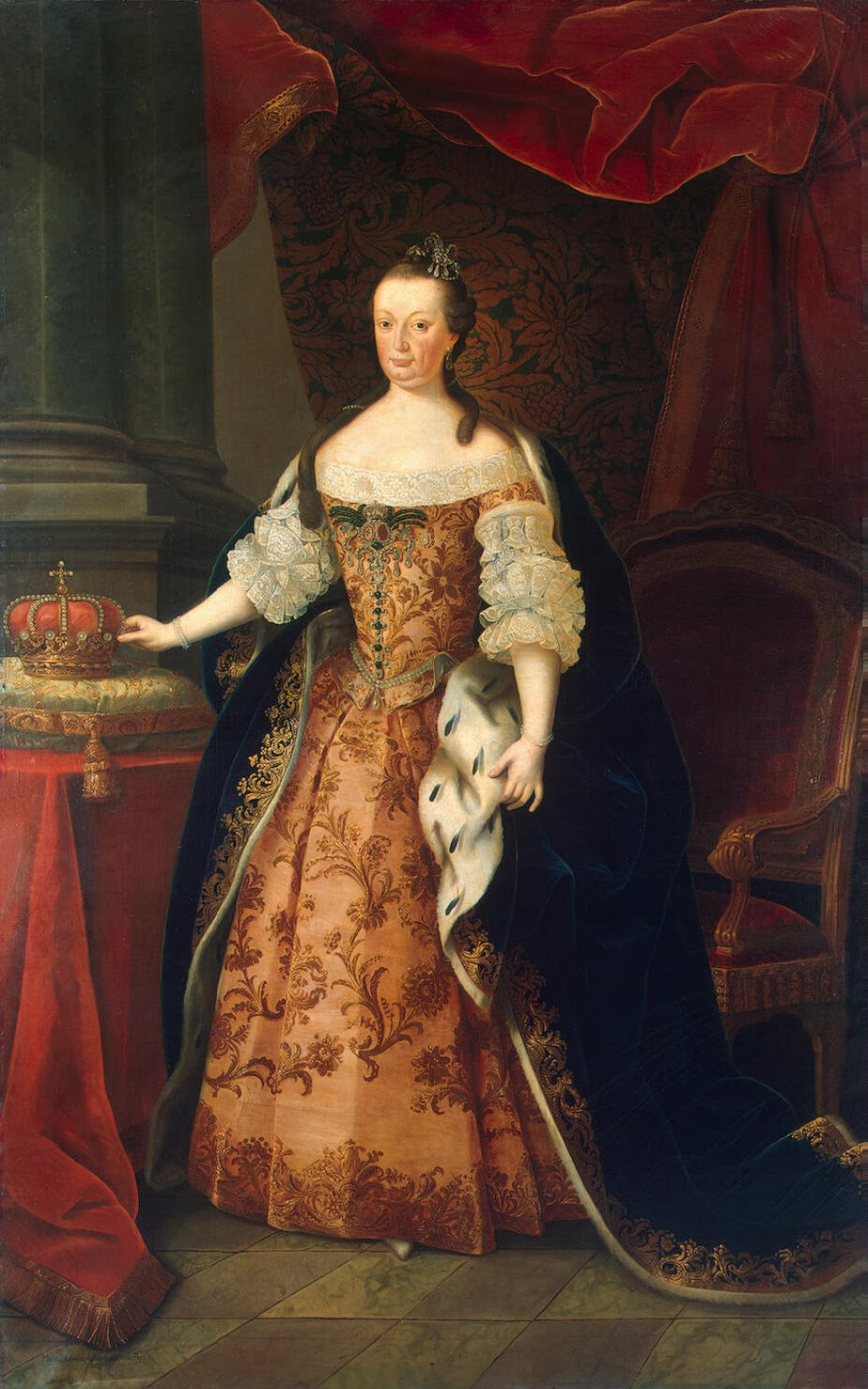
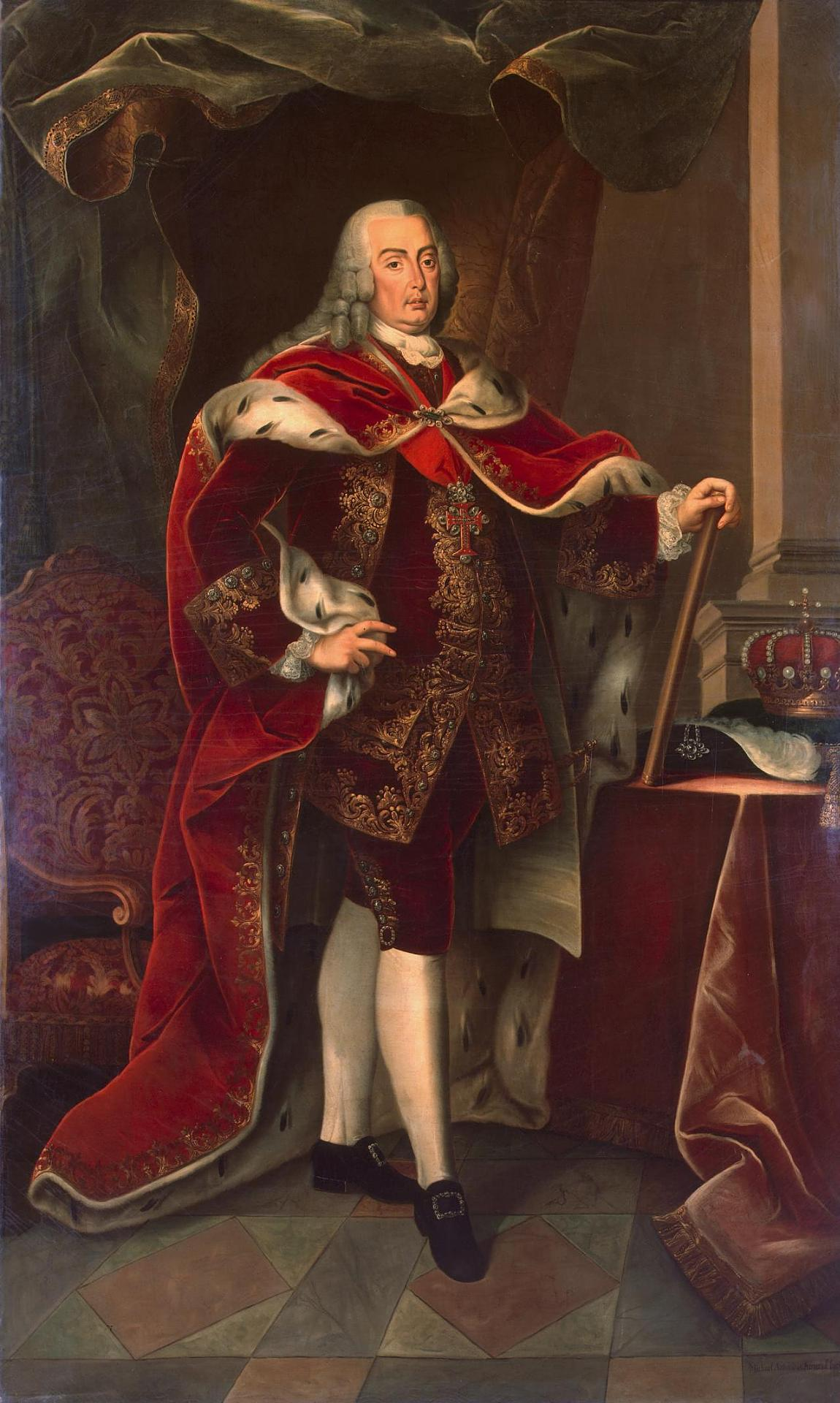
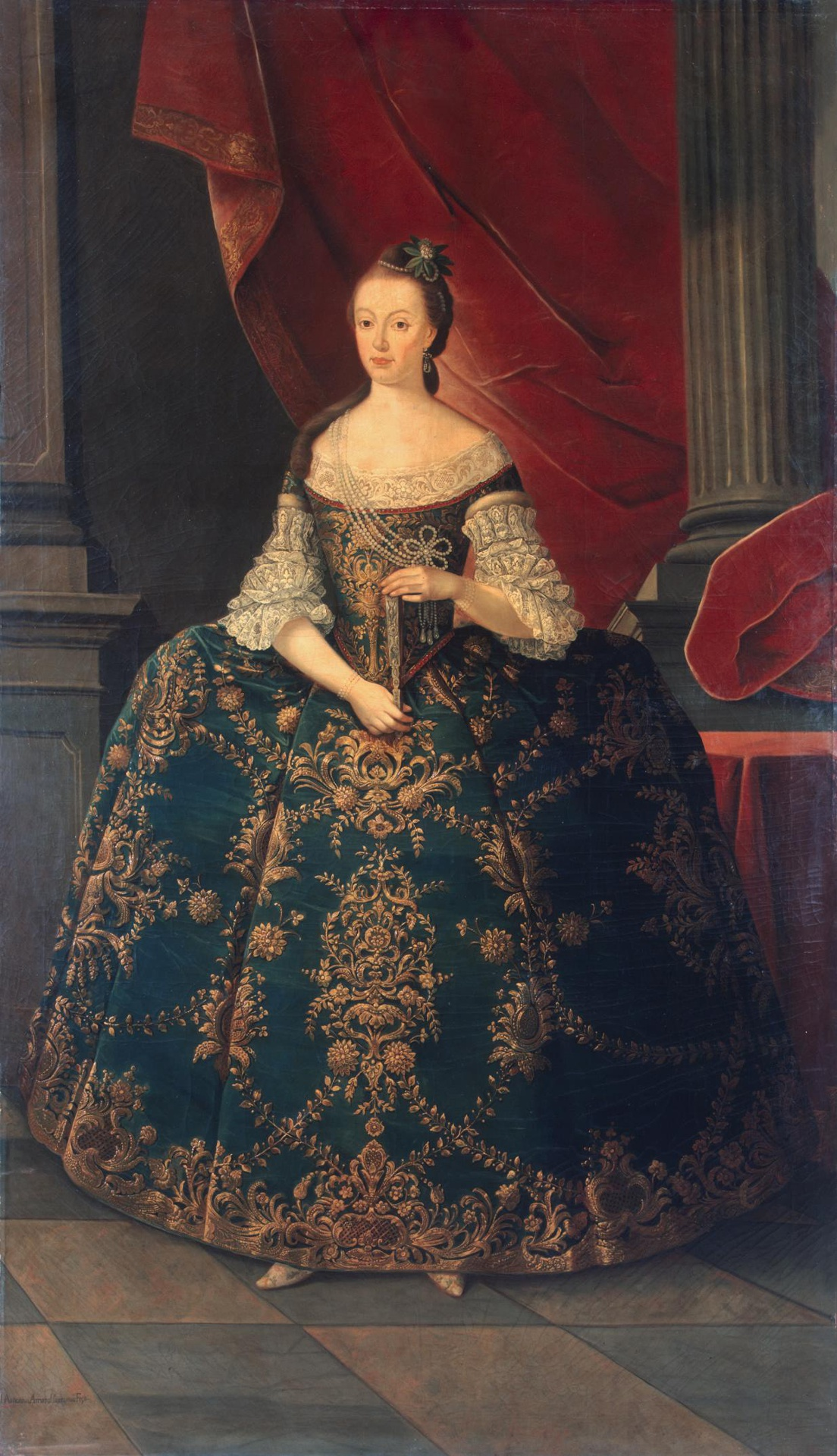
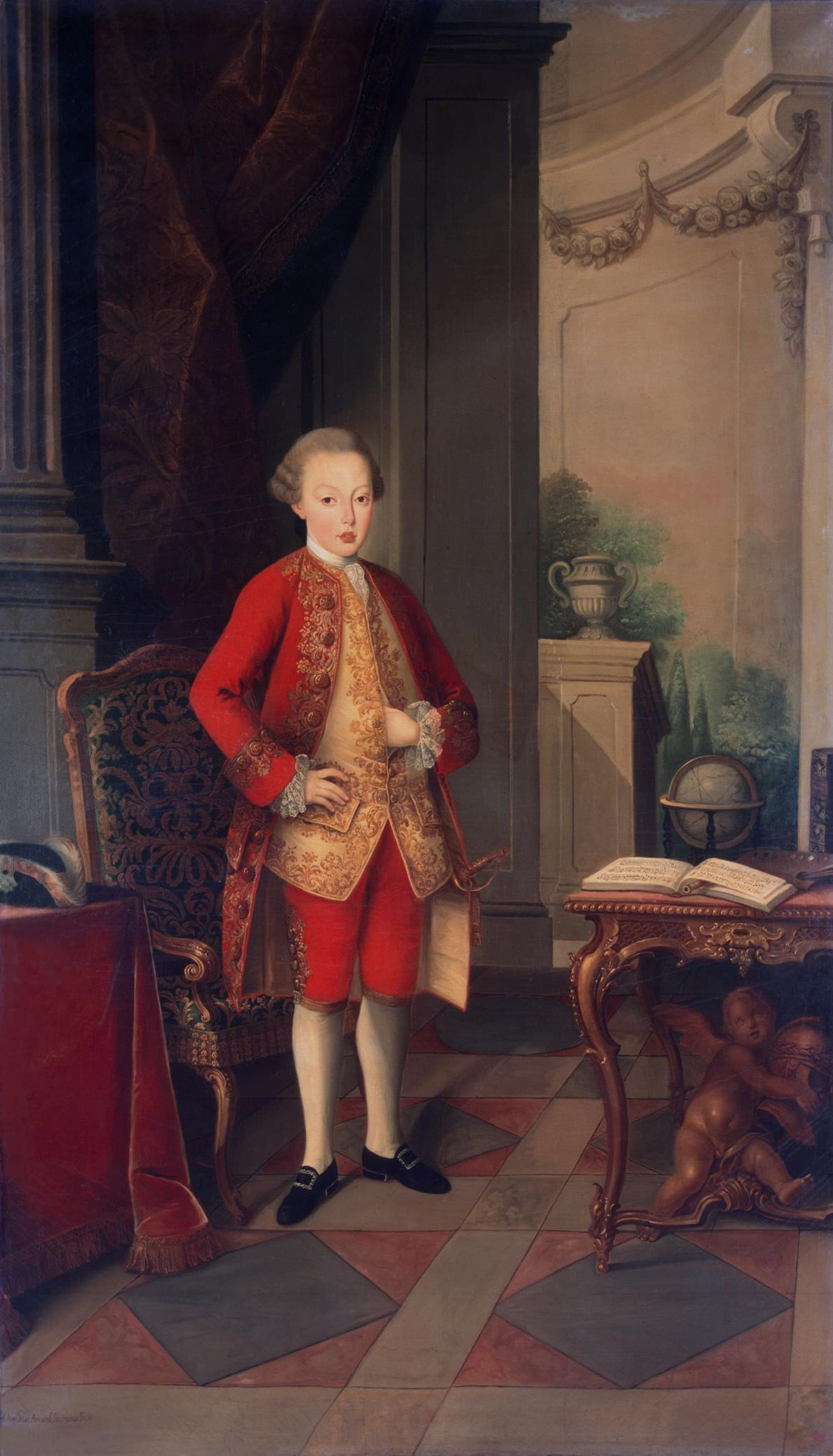
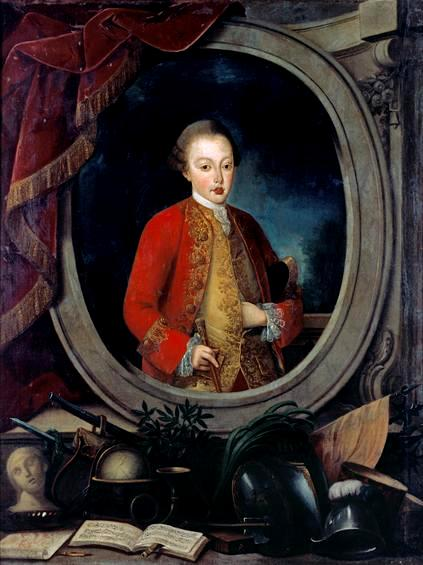
Mariana Victoria of Spain, Joseph I of Portugal, Maria Benedita, Princess of Beira, Duchess of Barcelos, José, Prince of Beira, Duke of Barcelos
