= Court painter =

Position at a royal court

Las Meninas, Diego Velázquez, 1656, shows a princess watching her unseen parents as Velázquez paints them; the cross on his chest was added later, according to legend painted by the king himself, after the artist received the Order of Santiago in 1659 (click on image and run cursor over to identify figures).

A court painter was an artist who painted for the members of a royal or princely family, sometimes on a fixed salary and on an exclusive basis where the artist was not supposed to undertake other work. Painters were the most common, but the court artist might also be a court sculptor. In Western Europe, the role began to emerge in the mid-13th century. By the Renaissance, portraits, mainly of the family, made up an increasingly large part of their commissions, and in the early modern period one person might be appointed solely to do portraits and another for other work, such as decorating new buildings.

Especially in the Late Middle Ages, they were often given the office of valet de chambre. Usually they were given a salary and formal title, and often a pension for life, though arrangements were highly variable. But often the artist was paid only a retainer and paid additionally for works he or, less often, she produced for the monarch. For the artist, a court appointment had the advantage of freeing them from the restriction of local painters' guilds, although in the Middle Ages and Renaissance they also often had to spend large amounts of time doing decorative work about the palace, and creating temporary works for court entertainments and displays. Some artists, like Jan van Eyck or Diego Velázquez, were used in other capacities at court, as diplomats, functionaries, or administrators.

In England the role of Serjeant Painter was set up for the more mundane decorative work, leaving the "King's painter" (and the queen's) free to paint mostly portraits. From the Stuarts to Queen Victoria the job was a regular court appointment called Principal Painter in Ordinary, and normally held by a specialist in portraits. Sometimes parallel and less official appointments were made, such as that of Francis Bourgeois as royal landscape painter, or the Flower Painter in Ordinary, who worked for the queen. Premier peintre du Roi ("First Painter of the King") was the main French appointment from 1603 to 1791, not always occupied. This was by no means restricted to portrait-painters, but unlike in other courts, the holder was always a French native.

Court sculptors were usually appointed when there was a large building programme that called for sculpture, or in periods, such as the decades around 1500 and the Baroque period, when portrait sculpture was especially in demand. In some 18th-century German courts, much of the court sculptor's work was designing figurines and other wares for the prince's porcelain factory. Heads for coins might also be designed by a court sculptor. There was no regular English role for a court sculptor, though Grinling Gibbons was called the "King's Carver" for Charles II. There are exceptions, notably Giambologna, whom the Medici never allowed to leave Florence for fear the Habsburgs would snap him up. For the most famous artists of the Renaissance, entrapment by a single court was something to avoid, as Titian was careful to do, by remaining in Venice.

== Court portraits ==
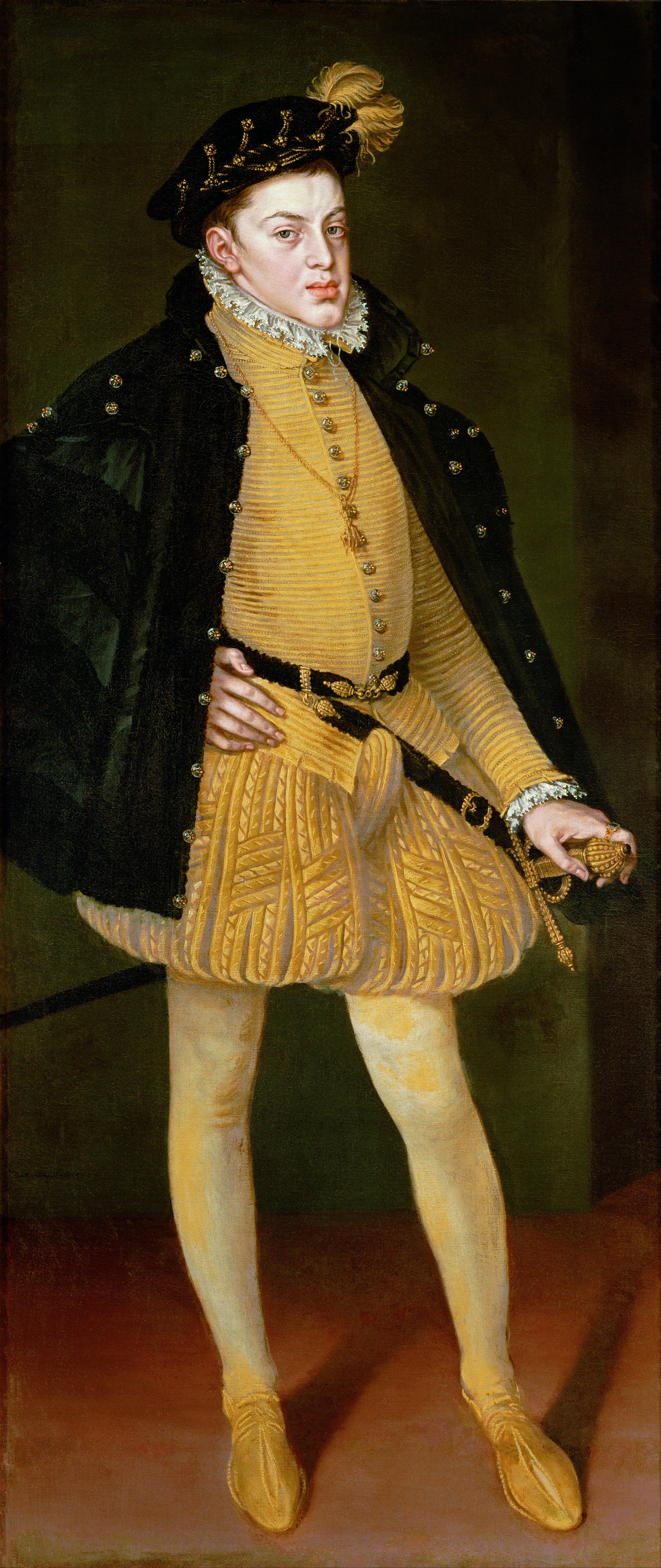
Don Carlos by Alonso Sánchez Coello, 1564. Sent to Vienna in an unsuccessful attempt to promote a marriage.

Medieval and Renaissance monarchs usually met each other very rarely, if at all, despite the dense web of kinship that tied them together. Princesses married abroad often never saw their close family again, and royal children were generally raised away from court, and might not see their parents for considerable intervals. As well as being icons of grandeur, portraits might be all that family members saw of each other's for many years, and were often keenly awaited and carefully examined. In particular, portraits of royal children, circulated within the family, might be anxiously scrutinized, and used to diagnose health issues.

Portraits of both parties to a marriage being negotiated were often exchanged, and for the men, they often seem to have been important in choosing a wife; it was preferred to send one's own painter to the lady, though the men were more often painted by an artist from the home side. One such portrait of Carlos, Prince of Asturias (1545–1568), was sent to Vienna, where a marriage was being considered, with a covering letter by the Austrian ambassador in Madrid noting aspects of his appearance that the painter had glossed over. The marriage never took place. Such portraits seem in fact to have been one of the earliest uses of court portraits, with examples from the 15th century, such as Henry VI of England sending "Hans the painter" to paint the daughters of John IV, Count of Armagnac as early as 1442.

From the mid-16th century, as the exchange of royal portraits grew, the works of painters at the largest courts were seen across Europe, giving them great opportunities to advertise their style. The stylistic continuity in the Spanish court was especially marked, beginning with Titian, who painted Charles V and Philip II, but could not be induced to move to Spain. Antonis Mor, from the Netherlands, worked for the Habsburgs for several years and developed a style that at its best combined much of the grandeur and psychological penetration of Titian's portraits with a more severe and formal presentation, admired in Spain, and a Netherlandish attention to detail and finish.

He could not be kept long in Spain, but trained Alonso Sánchez Coello, who was Philip's court painter for 28 years, until his death in 1588. He in turn trained Juan Pantoja de la Cruz, his successor, until he died in 1608. His pupil, the undistinguished Rodrigo de Villandrando then filled the role until his death in 1622, when the 23-year-old Diego Velázquez was summoned to Madrid and soon hired for the court, remaining with it until his death in 1660. His portraits in many respects draw on his predecessors.

By the 17th century official portraits had an agreed-upon model, occasionally renewed, which was increasingly copied in large numbers, often entirely by the court artist's workshop. Diplomatic exchanges of portraits of a new monarch became a standard courtesy, and the domestic nobility might be given them, or could buy them from the artist. By the 20th century, the court painter was a largely obsolete position, even where royal courts remained. A variety of fashionable portraitists were given sittings by royalty, whether for their own commissions or those of others.

== Asia and the Islamic world ==
In Islamic cultures, especially between the 14th and 17th centuries, similar arrangements operated for miniaturists and artists in other media. In the Persian miniature, the shah and other rulers typically maintained a "court workshop" or "atelier", of calligraphers, miniaturists, binders, and other crafts, usually managed by the royal librarian. More than in the West, the courts were the essential patrons of large-scale commissions, and political changes, or changes in personal tastes, could have a significant effect on the development of a style. The name by which Riza Abbasi is usually known includes the honorific title "Abbasi", which he and others were given by Shah Abbas I of Persia to associate them with their patron. Abd as-Samad, a Persian painter who moved to the Mughal Empire, was given a number of significant administrative jobs, as indeed was his artist son. The court remained the focus of patronage of painting in the "sub-Mughal" princely courts of India, whether Muslim or Hindu; the 18th-century painter Nainsukh is a leading example.

In China, court painters tended to work in an entirely different style and paint different subject matter than the more respected literati painters, who mostly painted landscapes in monochrome ink wash painting, though there was overlap in both directions. The court style was usually what is known as gongbi ("meticulous"), brightly coloured, fairly realistic, and using precise brush-strokes. Typical subjects included a relatively small number of portraits of the imperial family, the viewing of which was largely restricted to the family itself; animals, birds, and flowers; and paintings of imperial ceremonies and progresses. But landscapes were painted, some with views of rural imperial houses at the centre.

Court style panorama Along the River During the Qingming Festival, an 18th-century copy (the "Qing Court Version") of the 12th century Song dynasty original by Zhang Zeduan. Zhang's original painting is revered by scholars as "one of Chinese civilization’s greatest masterpieces." The scroll begins at the right end, and culminates above as the Emperor boards his yacht to join the festive boats on the river. The scroll is over 10 metres long (35.6 × 1152.8 cm)

== Designers for other media ==
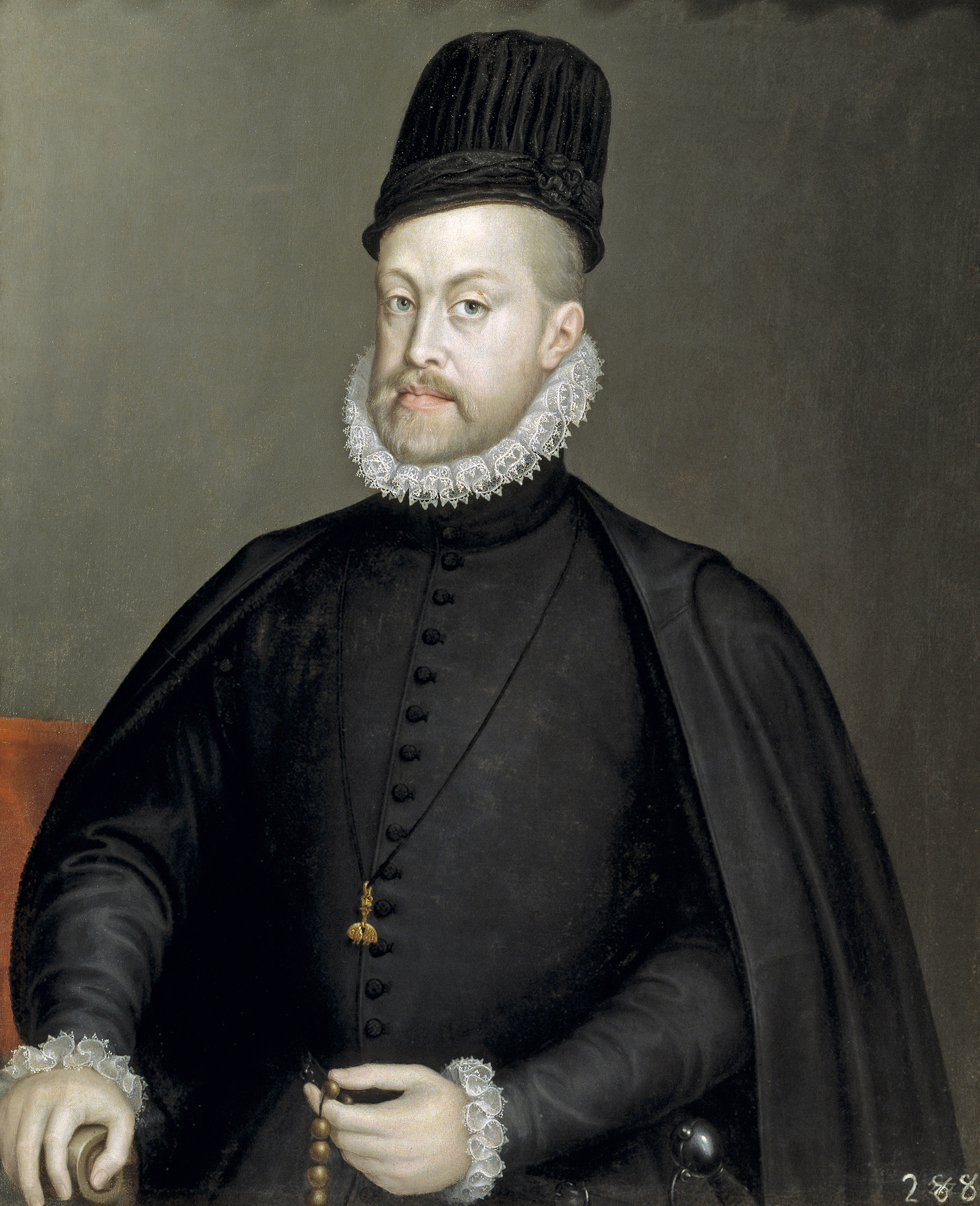
The Prado Philip II, now recognised as by Sofonisba Anguissola

At many periods rulers owned or controlled royal workshops or factories making high-quality tapestries, porcelain or pottery, silks, and other types of objects. This was especially the case in China and in the Byzantine Empire. Often court painters and sculptors worked on the designs for these products; for example, the finest carpets of Persia, Ottoman Turkey and Mughal India reflect very closely developments in style found in other media such as Ottoman illumination, and it is usually assumed that designs were sent to the weavers from the court. The same process can be better documented in 17th century France, where the court painter Charles Le Brun was director of the royal Gobelins Manufactory, then producing far more than just tapestries, and also designed the royal commissions from the private Savonnerie manufactory of carpets. Le Brun dominated, and largely created, the style found throughout Louis XIV's palaces, which was then hugely influential in France and throughout Europe.

== Women court artists ==
A number of women painters were successful in obtaining court commissions, though few gained the top positions. Some, like Sofonisba Anguissola, one of the most successful, were specifically in the service of the queen rather than the king, and appointed lady-in-waiting. Elisabeth of Valois, the third queen of Philip II of Spain, was a keen amateur painter, and it was considered easier in terms of court protocol to have a female tutor for her. Anguissola, from an Italian family of the minor aristocracy, was recruited to come to Madrid for this, starting immediately after the fourteen-year-old queen's wedding. As well as the relaxed portrait style she had previously developed, she learnt the formal Spanish court style, and was used for portraits of male royalty. There is now some confusion between her work and that of the main court painter Alonso Sánchez Coello, one of whose daughters also became a painter and assistant to her father.

The leading woman among the artists of the Tudor court was Levina Teerlinc, who was given an annual salary of £40 from 1546 to her death in 1576, thus serving four monarchs, producing mainly portrait miniatures. Other women who courted painters, also all portraitists, included the Flemish Renaissance painter Catharina van Hemessen (1528 – after 1565) to Mary of Hungary, brother of Charles V and his governor of the Netherlands; Adélaïde Labille-Guiard (1749–1803) in France; Marie Ellenrieder (1791– 1863) to Grand Duchess Sophie of Baden (also selling works to Queen Victoria), and Catharina Treu (1743 – 1811) to Charles Theodore, Elector of Bavaria.

The flower painter Rachel Ruysch (1664–1750) obtained a court position with Johann Wilhelm, Elector Palatine in 1708, but on terms that allowed her to remain in Amsterdam, only travelling to Düsseldorf periodically to deliver paintings. Angelica Kauffman in 1782 turned down an offer from the court of Naples in order to preserve her freedom.

== Incomplete list of court painters (A-Z) ==
| Painter | Nationality | Court |
|---|---|---|
| Miguel António do Amaral | Portuguese | Joseph I of Portugal; Maria I of Portugal; Joseph, Prince of Brazil |
| Jacopo Amigoni | Italian | Ferdinand VI of Spain |
| Friedrich von Amerling | Austrian | Franz Joseph I of Austria |
| Nikiforos Lytras | Greek | Otto of Greece; Amalia of Oldenburg |
| Ferdinand Bauer | Austrian | Prince of Liechtenstein |
| Wu Bin | Chinese | Ming dynasty |
| Bishandas | Indian | Jahangir |
| Francis Bourgeois | English | George III of the United Kingdom |
| Agnolo di Cosimo | Italian | Medici |
| Giovanni Maria delle Piane | Italian | Elizabeth Farnese |
| Claude Deruet | French | Charles V, Duke of Lorraine |
| Jean-Baptiste Debret | French | John VI of Portugal; Pedro IV and I of Portugal and Brazil |
| Jacques d'Agar | French | Christian V of Denmark |
| Dosso Dossi | Italian | Alphonso I of Ferrara; Ercole II d'Este |
| Hans Dürer | German | Sigismund I of Poland |
| Anthony van Dyck | Flemish | Charles I of England |
| David Klöcker Ehrenstrahl | Swedish | Charles XI of Sweden |
| Jan van Eyck | Flemish | Philip the Good |
| Domenico Fetti | Italian | Gonzaga family |
| Jean Fouquet | French | Louis XI of France |
| Nuno Gonçalves | Portuguese | Afonso V of Portugal; Joan, Princess of Portugal |
| Francisco Goya | Spanish | Charles III of Spain; Charles IV of Spain; Ferdinand VII of Spain |
| Carl Haag | Anglo-German | Queen Victoria; Duke of Saxe-Coburg and Gotha |
| George Hayter | English | Queen Victoria |
| Joseph Hickel | Austrian | Joseph II, Holy Roman Emperor |
| Hans Holbein the Younger | German | Henry VIII of England |
| Hyewon | Korean | Joseon dynasty |
| Jens Juel | Danish | Christian VII of Denmark |
| Cristóvão de Morais | Portuguese | John III of Portugal; João Manuel, Prince of Portugal; Sebastian I of Portugal |
| Abdulcelil Levni | Turkish | Mustafa II; Ahmed III |
| Louis-Michel van Loo | French | Philip V of Spain |
| Vieira Lusitano | Portuguese | Joseph I of Portugal; Maria I of Portugal |
| Andrea Mantegna | Italian | Mantua |
| Tosa Mitsuoki | Japanese | Edo |
| Uemura Shōen | Japanese | Emperor Shōwa |
| Bernard van Orley | Flemish | Margaret of Austria; Mary of Austria, Queen of Hungary |
| Francesco Raibolini | Italian | Mantua |
| Benjamin de Rolland | French | Joachim Murat, King of Naples |
| Peter Paul Rubens | Flemish | Vincenzo I of Gonzaga; Philip IV of Spain |
| Rachel Ruysch | Dutch | Johann Wilhelm, Elector Palatine |
| Lucienne de Saint-Mart | French | Nicholas II of Russia |
| Alonso Sánchez Coello | Spanish; Portuguese | John III of Portugal; João Manuel, Prince of Portugal; Philip II of Spain; Sebastian I of Portugal |
| James Sant | English | Queen Victoria |
| Louis de Silvestre | French | King Augustus II of Poland; Augustus III of Poland |
| Domingos Sequeira | Portuguese | John VI of Portugal |
| Peter Snayers | Flemish | Cardinal-Infante Ferdinand; Archduke Leopold Wilhelm of Austria |
| Dirk Stoop | Dutch | John IV of Portugal; Catherine of Braganza; Charles II of England |
| Titian | Italian | Charles V, Holy Roman Emperor; Philip II of Spain |
| Giuseppe Troni | Italian | Maria I of Portugal; John VI of Portugal |
| Diego Velázquez | Spanish | Philip IV of Spain |
| Jan Cornelisz Vermeyen | Dutch | Margaret of Austria |
| Leonardo da Vinci | Italian | Ludovico Sforza; Cesare Borgia; Francis I of France |
| Zhang Zeduan | Chinese | Northern Song dynasty |
| Sofonisba Anguissola | Italian | Philip II of Spain |
| Matthias Grünewald | German | Uriel von Gemmingen, Archbishop of Mainz |
| Sanwlah Artist | Mughal Empire | Jahangir |
| Georgios Jakobides | Greek | Olga Constantinovna of Russia; Sophia of Prussia; George I of Greece |
