= Princess of Portugal (by marriage) =

This is a list of princesses of Portugal, since 1388, by marriage. In 1645, the title was replaced with Princess of Brazil.

Picture	Name	Father	Birth	Marriage	Became Princess	Ceased to be Princess	Death	Spouse
	Eleanor of Viseu	Ferdinand, Duke of Viseu (Aviz)	2 May 1458	22 January 1470		28 August 1481 became queen	17 November 1525	John
	Isabella of Castile	Ferdinand II of Aragon (Trastámara)	2 October 1470	3 November 1490		13 July 1491 husband's death	28 August 1498	Afonso
	Joanna of Castile	Charles V, Holy Roman Emperor (Habsburg)	24 June 1535	7 December 1552		2 January 1554 husband's death	7 September 1573	John Manuel
	Elisabeth of France	Henry IV of France (Bourbon)	22 November 1602	25 November 1615		31 March 1621 became queen	6 October 1644	Philip

== See also ==
- List of Portuguese consorts
- Princess of Brazil
- Princess Royal of Portugal
- Princess of Beira
