= Princess of Brazil =

This is a list of princesses of Brazil, from 1645 to 1815, both by marriage and birth. The title was preceded by the titles Princess of Portugal and succeeded by Princess Royal of Portugal.

The title was created by King John IV of Portugal on 27 October 1645 in favor of his eldest son and heir Infante Teodósio, soon after Portugal had gotten rid of its Spanish rulers. During the 1645–1815, "Prince of Brazil" was always conferred on the heir apparent of the throne, who also received the title of Duke of Braganza. The title was abolished when Brazil became independent and joined the United Kingdom of Portugal.

Brazil would later break from the United Kingdom and become the independent Empire of Brazil. The heirs presumptive of Brazil were known as Prince Imperial of Brazil or Princess Imperial of Brazil, with the style of Imperial Highness. Other members of the Brazilian Imperial Family were known by the title of Prince or Princess prefixed to their given names, with the style of Highness. The Portuguese title of Prince of Brazil, that existed as a title of the Portuguese heir apparent only while Brazil was still a possession of Portugal, should therefore not be confused with the later ranks of Brazilian Prince or Brazilian Princess, that stem from the era of the Empire of Brazil.

== By birth ==
This is a list of princesses of Brazil who held the title by their own right:

Picture	Name	Heiress of	Birth	Became Heiress to the Throne	Ceased to be Princess of Brazil	Death
	Isabel Luísa, Princess of Beira	Pedro II	6 January 1669	6 November 1683 father's accession as King	30 August 1688 brother's birth	21 October 1690
	Isabel Luísa, Princess of Beira	Pedro II	6 January 1669	17 September 1688 brother's death	22 October 1689 brother's birth	21 October 1690
	Bárbara, Princess of Beira	João V	4 December 1711		19 October 1712 brother's birth	27 August 1758
	Maria Francisca, Princess of Brazil later Maria I	José I	17 December 1734	31 July 1750 father's accession as King	24 February 1777 became Queen regnant	20 March 1816

== By marriage ==
This is a list of princesses of Brazil who held the title by marriage to a prince of Brazil:

Picture	Name	Father	Birth	Marriage	Became Princess	Ceased to be Princess	Death	Spouse
	Infanta Mariana Victoria of Spain	Philip V of Spain (Bourbon)	31 March 1718	19 January 1729		31 July 1750 became Queen consort	15 January 1781	Prince José
	Infanta Benedita of Portugal	Joseph I of Portugal (Braganza)	25 July 1746	21 February 1777	24 February 1777 became Princess	11 September 1788 husband's death	18 August 1829	Prince José
	Infanta Carlota of Spain	Charles IV of Spain (Bourbon)	25 April 1775	8 May 1785	11 September 1788 brother-in-law's death	16 December 1815; Brazil became a Kingdom	7 January 1830	Prince João

== See also ==
- List of Brazilian consorts
- List of Portuguese consorts
- Princess of Portugal
- Princess Royal of Portugal
- Princess of Beira
