= Peter of Portugal =

Peter of Portugal (Portuguese: Pedro) is the name of several Portuguese kings and infantes:

Kings:

- Peter I of Portugal (1320–1367)
- Peter II of Portugal (1648–1706)
- Peter III of Portugal (1717–1786), King Consort of Portugal on the succession of his wife and niece Queen Mary I of Portugal
- Peter IV of Portugal (1798–1834), also Peter I, Emperor of Brazil
- Peter V of Portugal (1837–1861)

Infantes:

- Infante Pedro, Count of Urgell (1187–1258), son of Sancho I of Portugal and Dulce of Aragon
- Infante Pedro of Portugal (1370–1370), son of Ferdinand I of Portugal and Leonor Telles de Menezes
- Infante Pedro, Duke of Coimbra (1392–1449), son of John I of Portugal and Philippa of Lancaster
- Peter V of Aragon, Infante Pedro, titular King of Aragon (1429–1466), son of Infante Pedro, Duke of Coimbra, and Isabella of Urgell
- Pedro, Prince of Brazil (1712–1714), son of John V of Portugal and Mary Anne of Austria
- Dom Pedro II of Brazil (Peter II; 1825–1891), Emperor of Brazil following his father Pedro IV (Peter IV) of Portugal (I of Brazil). He was never an infante of Portugal for having been born after Brazil's independence
