= Mariana Victoria of Spain =

Queen of Portugal from 1750 to 1777

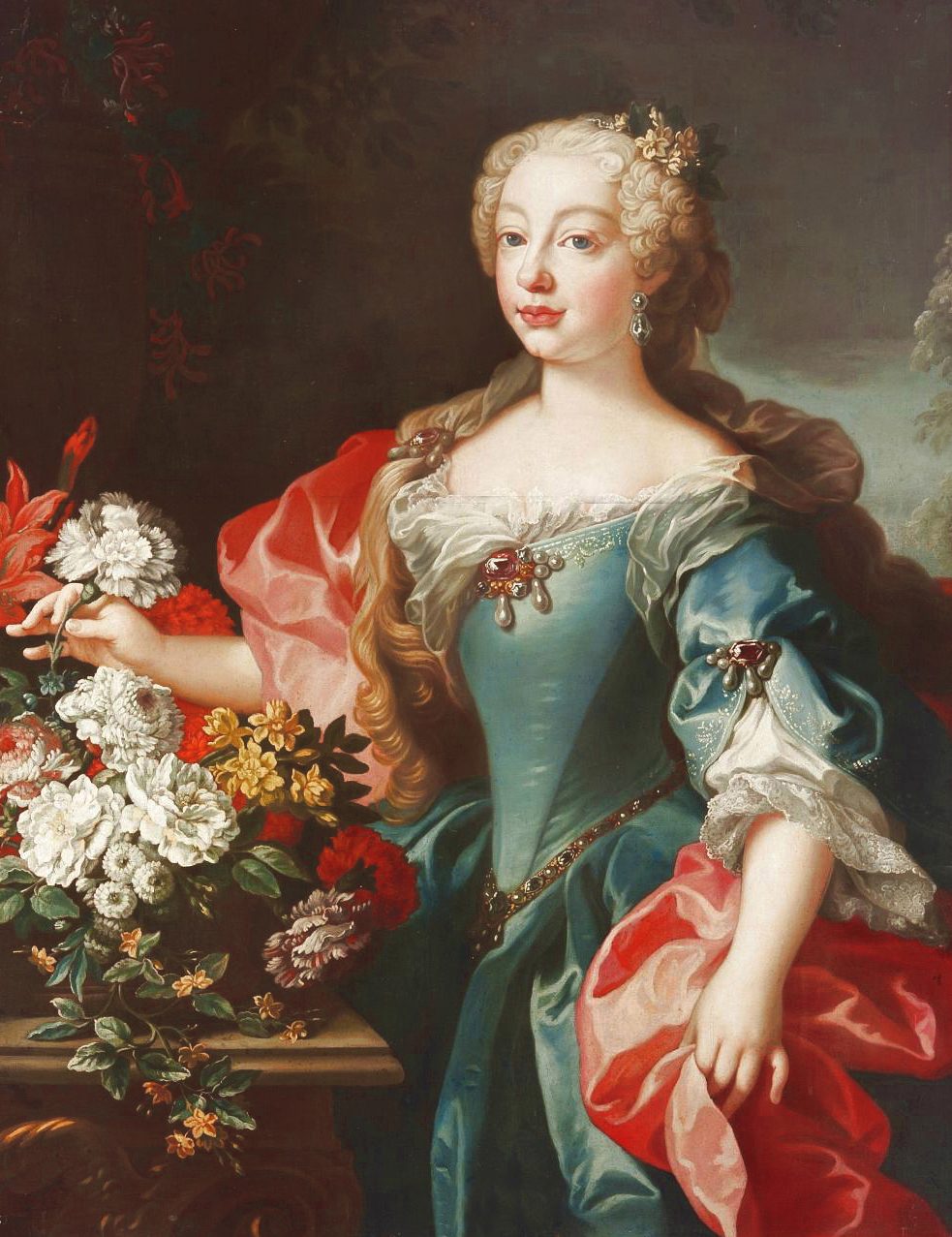
- Portrait by Domenico Maria Sani at the Palace of Caserta

Queen consort of Portugal
- Tenure: 31 July 1750 – 24 February 1777
- Born: 31 March 1718; Royal Alcazar of Madrid, Madrid, Spain
- Died: 15 January 1781 (aged 62); Barraca Real of Ajuda, Lisbon, Portugal
- Burial: 17 January 1781; Pantheon of the House of Braganza, Monastery of São Vicente de Fora, Lisbon, Portugal
- Spouse: Joseph I of Portugal (m. 1729; died 1777)
- Issue: Maria I of Portugal; Infanta Mariana; Infanta Doroteia; Benedita, Princess of Brazil
Names
- Spanish: Maria Ana Victoria de Borbón y Farnesio; Portuguese: Maria Ana Vitória de Farnésio e Bourbon; French: Marie Anne Victoire d'Espagne
- House: Bourbon
- Father: Philip V of Spain
- Mother: Elisabeth Farnese

Mariana Victoria of Spain (Portuguese: Mariana Vitória; 31 March 1718 – 15 January 1781) was an Infanta of Spain by birth and was later the Queen of Portugal as the wife of King Joseph I. She acted as regent of Portugal in 1776–1777, during the last months of her husband's life, and as advisor to her daughter, Maria I of Portugal, during her reign.

== Early life ==
Mariana Victoria was born at the Royal Alcazar of Madrid in Madrid on 31 March 1718 and was given the same forenames as her paternal grandmother Maria Anna Victoria of Bavaria, wife of Louis, Grand Dauphin of France. She was an Infanta of Spain by birth and the eldest daughter of Philip V of Spain and his second wife Elisabeth Farnese. Her father was a grandson of Louis XIV and had inherited the Spanish throne in 1700. At the time of her birth, Mariana Victoria was fifth in line to the throne of Spain behind her half brothers Infante Louis, Prince of Asturias, Infante Ferdinand, Infante Pedro as well as her full brother Infante Charles. As an Infanta of Spain, she had the style of Royal Highness.

=== Engagement to Louis XV ===
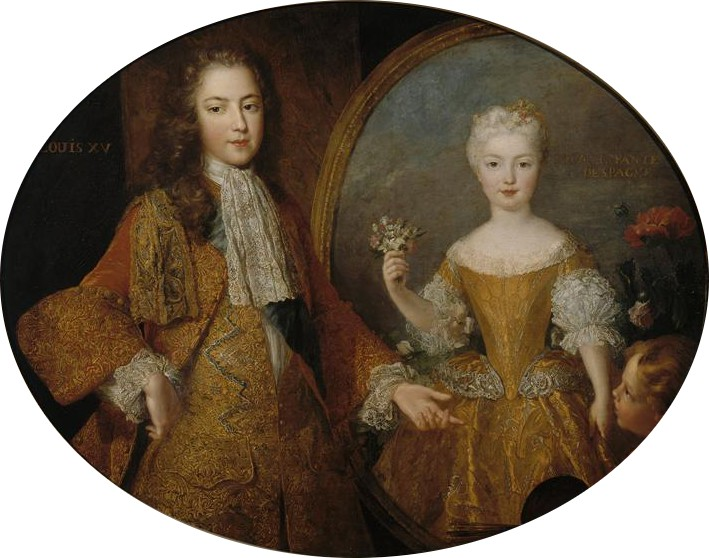
Louis XV and Mariana Victoria double portrait by Alexis Simon Belle.

After the War of the Quadruple Alliance, France and Spain decided to reconcile by engaging the Infanta Mariana Victoria to her first cousin the young Louis XV. Organised by Philippe d'Orléans, Regent of France for the 11-year-old Louis XV, the match was part of a wider set of engagements which included the proposal of Philip V's eldest son Infante Louis, Prince of Asturias to Élisabeth d'Orléans, Mademoiselle de Montpensier followed by another proposal between Philippine Élisabeth d'Orléans, Mademoiselle de Beaujolais to the young Infante Charles.

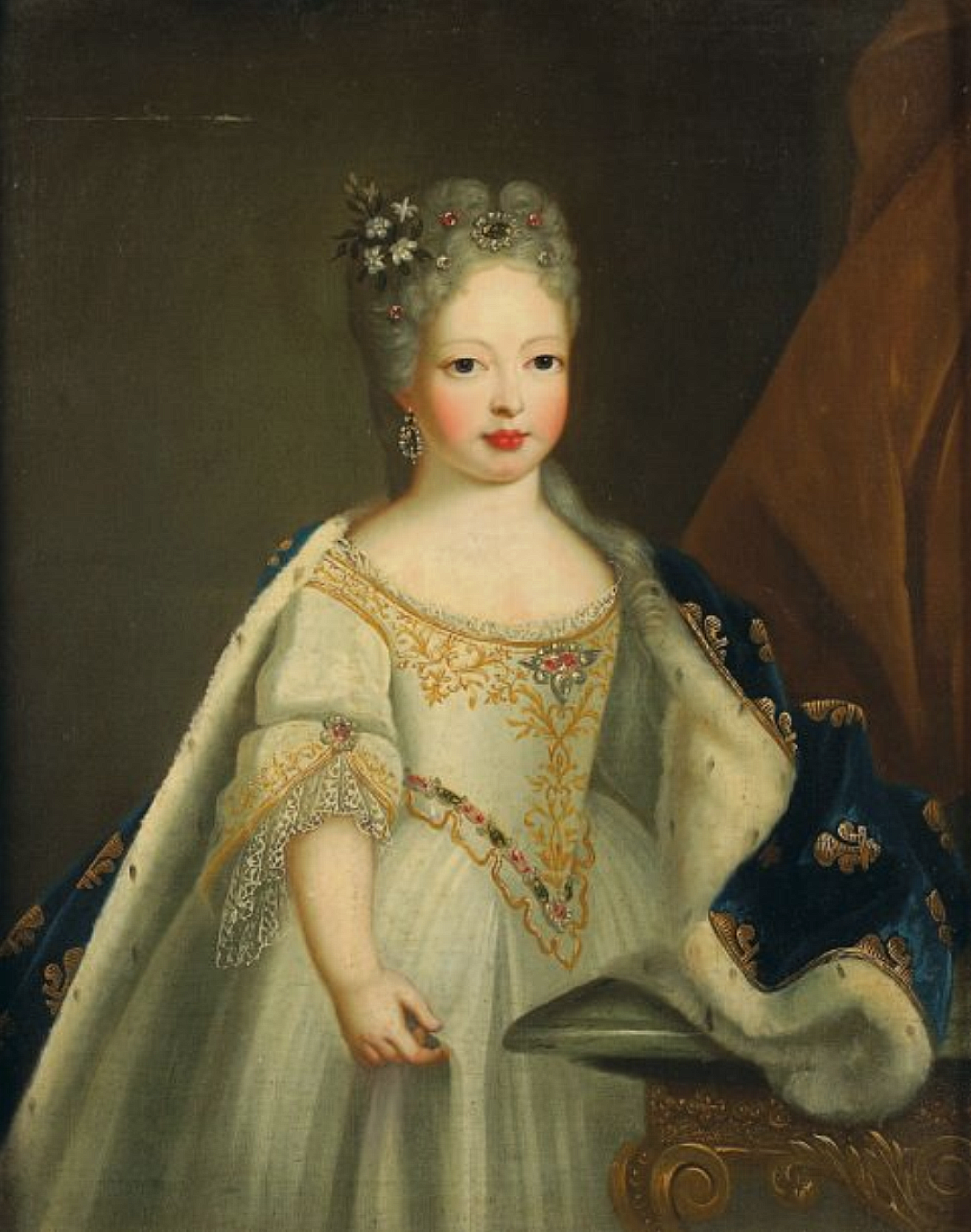
Mariana Victoria as a child, by unknown painter.

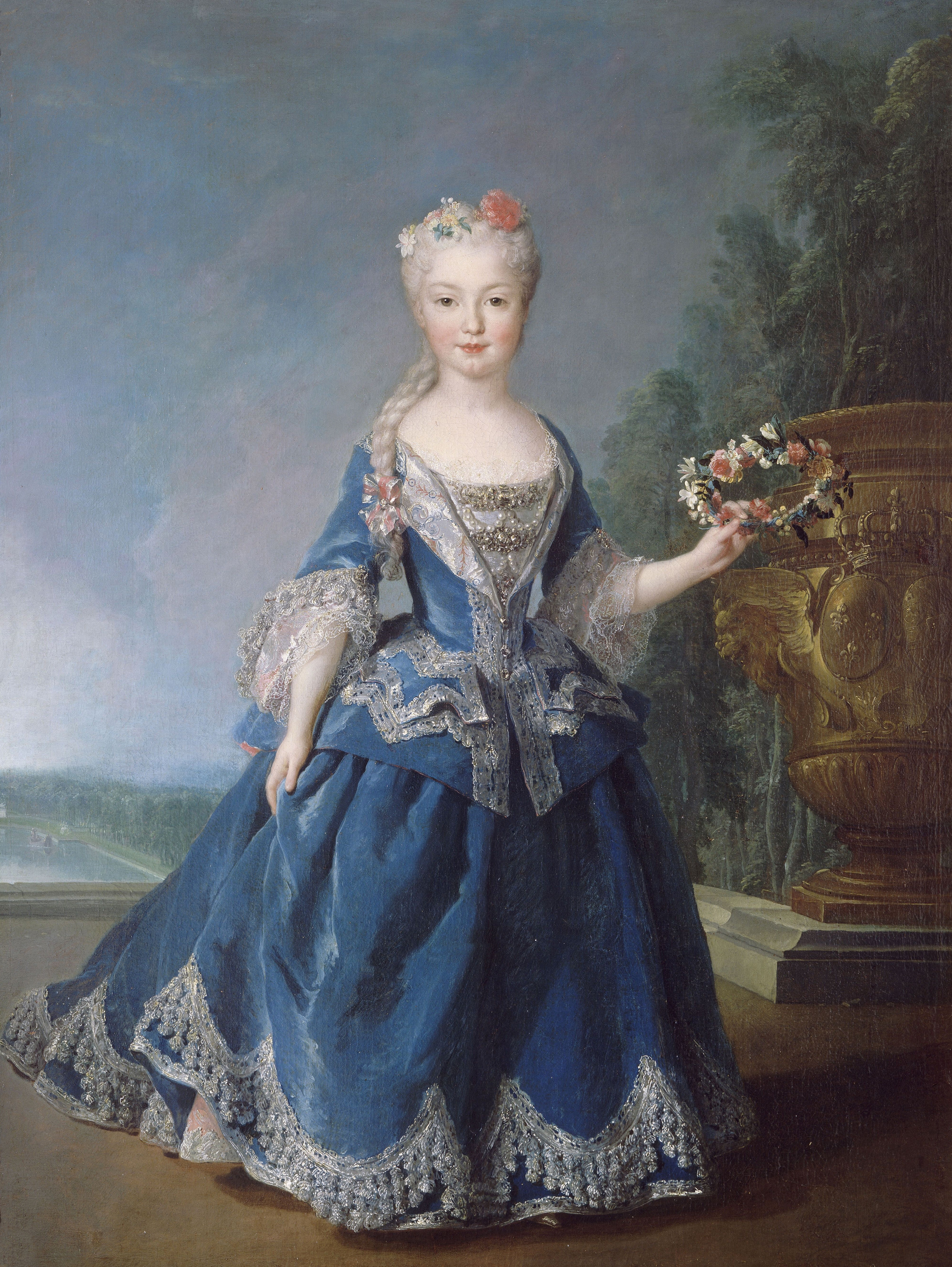
Mariana Victoria, c. 1726

The Duc de Saint-Simon, the French ambassador, requested her hand on 25 November 1721. The exchange of the young Infanta and Mademoiselle de Montpensier was on the Île des Faisans ("Isle of Pheasants") and was the site where their common ancestors, Louis XIV and Maria Theresa of Spain, had met in 1660. Mariana Victoria arrived in Paris on 2 March 1722 amongst much celebration, and took up residence at the Palais du Louvre. The young Infanta was nicknamed the l'infante Reine ("Queen-Infanta") as the couple were not to be married until Mariana Victoria reached a more mature age. Mariana Victoria was in awe of Louis XV and was popular with the court – apart from the king himself, who avoided her presence.

According to the mother of the Regent, Elizabeth Charlotte of the Palatinate, Mariana Victoria was the "sweetest and prettiest little thing" and had considerable wit for her age. Her education was placed in the care of Marie Anne de Bourbon, the legitimised daughter of Louis XIV and Louise de La Vallière, and Madame de Ventadour was appointed her governess. She did, however, also keep her Spanish Aya, María de las Nieves, who had accompanied her from Spain. In February 1723, Louis XV reached his majority and from then on governed the country according to his wishes.

Her establishment in France was not to be. Under the influence of the Prime Minister Louis Henri, Duke of Bourbon, and his mistress Madame de Prie, the decision was made to send the seven-year-old Mariana Victoria back to Spain on 11 March 1725. Bourbon had wanted to maintain influence over the young Louis XV and offered his sister Henriette Louise de Bourbon as a potential wife who, unlike Mariana Victoria, was old enough to conceive. The situation was not helped by the Spanish rejection of Louise Élisabeth d'Orléans, whose husband died having ruled as Louis I of Spain for only seven months. As their marriage had not been consummated, the Spanish refused to support her and ordered that she return to France with her sister Philippine Élisabeth. Mariana Victoria left Versailles on 5 April 1725 and travelled to the frontier where she and the two Orléans daughters were then exchanged. Louis XV subsequently married Marie Leszczyńska in September 1725, and Mariana Victoria's sister the Infanta Maria Teresa Rafaela married Louis XV's son in 1745 to reassure the insulted Spanish court.

== Crown Princess of Portugal ==
Her arrival in Spain was taken as a great insult, and caused a diplomatic rift between Spain and France. The offended Spanish soon afterward concluded a treaty with Austria, the 1725 Treaty of Vienna, whilst France sought support from England. Having remained unmarried she was still eligible to inherit the throne, but was displaced by her younger brother Infante Philip who was born in 1720. Discussions with the Kingdom of Portugal began in 1727 and a marriage was negotiated by the Portuguese ambassador the Marquis of Abrantes. She was a rumored bride for Emperor Peter II of Russia, grandson of Peter the Great. Another double marriage was planned. Mariana Victoria would marry the Infante José, "Prince of Brazil", son and heir of João V of Portugal. Her older half-brother Ferdinand, "Prince of Asturias", would marry José's sister the Infanta Bárbara. Mariana Victoria married the Prince of Brazil (traditional title for the Portuguese heir to the throne) on 19 January 1729 at Elvas in Portugal. The Prince of Asturias (traditional title for the Spanish heir to the throne) married the Infanta Bárbara the next day at Badajoz. From her marriage until the time of her husband's accession to the throne in 1750, she was styled Her Royal Highness the Princess of Brazil.

Mariana and Joseph would soon have a close relationship. The couple enjoyed hunting as well as music – Mariana Victoria was an accomplished singer – they patronized Italian opera singers and the theatre but were both passionately religious. Despite this, her husband maintained various mistresses, much to the dislike of his strong-willed wife. During her marriage, Mariana Victoria gave birth to eight children, four of whom survived infancy. Her first child Infanta Maria was given the style Princess of Beira as the heir apparent to her father. Two of Mariana Victoria's daughters remained unmarried. Her daughter Infanta Mariana Francisca was a proposed bride for the Dauphin of France, son of Louis XV, but Mariana Victoria herself rejected the plan. When her other daughter Infanta Doroteia was proposed as a wife for the future Philippe Égalité Mariana Victoria again refused to the match. Her youngest daughter Infanta Benedita married José, Prince of Brazil, Mariana Victoria's grandson. The latter marriage was organised by Mariana Victoria herself after the death of her husband.

== Queen and regent ==
At the death of her father-in-law, King John V, in 1750, her husband became the ruler of the Portuguese Empire which had significant territories in South America. Her husband's reign was dominated by the influence of the Marquis of Pombal who was a favourite of the Queen mother. Joseph I soon left the governing of the state to Pombal who used his power to remove the influence of the church at the court as well as that of his enemies. Mariana Victoria and her daughter disliked the influence Pombal had over Joseph I. Her husband's reign was marred by the devastating 1755 Lisbon earthquake of 1 November 1755 which killed 100,000 people. The earthquake caused Joseph I to develop a severe case of claustrophobia and he was never again comfortable living within a walled building. Consequently, he moved the royal court to an extensive complex of tents in the hills of Ajuda. It was Pombal who organised the reconstruction of Lisbon in the aftermath of the earthquake.

In 1759, the Távora affair emerged after an assassination attempt on her husband failed and the powerful Távora family were, in the eyes of Pombal, completely responsible for the attack. Pombal later ordered the execution of all members of the noble family and it was only at the intervention of Mariana Victoria and her daughter, the Princess of Brazil, that some women and children were spared. As Pombal was de facto ruler of the state, Mariana Victoria and her husband took a less prominent role in politics.

Her husband, having suffered from a series of strokes, decided to allow his wife to take his place as head of government. As such, Mariana Victoria was created Regent of Portugal in her husband's name. Created Regent on 29 November 1776, she remained so until her husband's death on 24 February 1777. Upon her husband's death, their eldest daughter became the first queen regnant as Maria I. Throughout Maria I's reign Mariana Victoria exerted significant influence on her daughter, who would often ask her mother's advice on matters of state. In the early days of Maria I's reign, Pombal was exiled to the country.

== Queen dowager ==
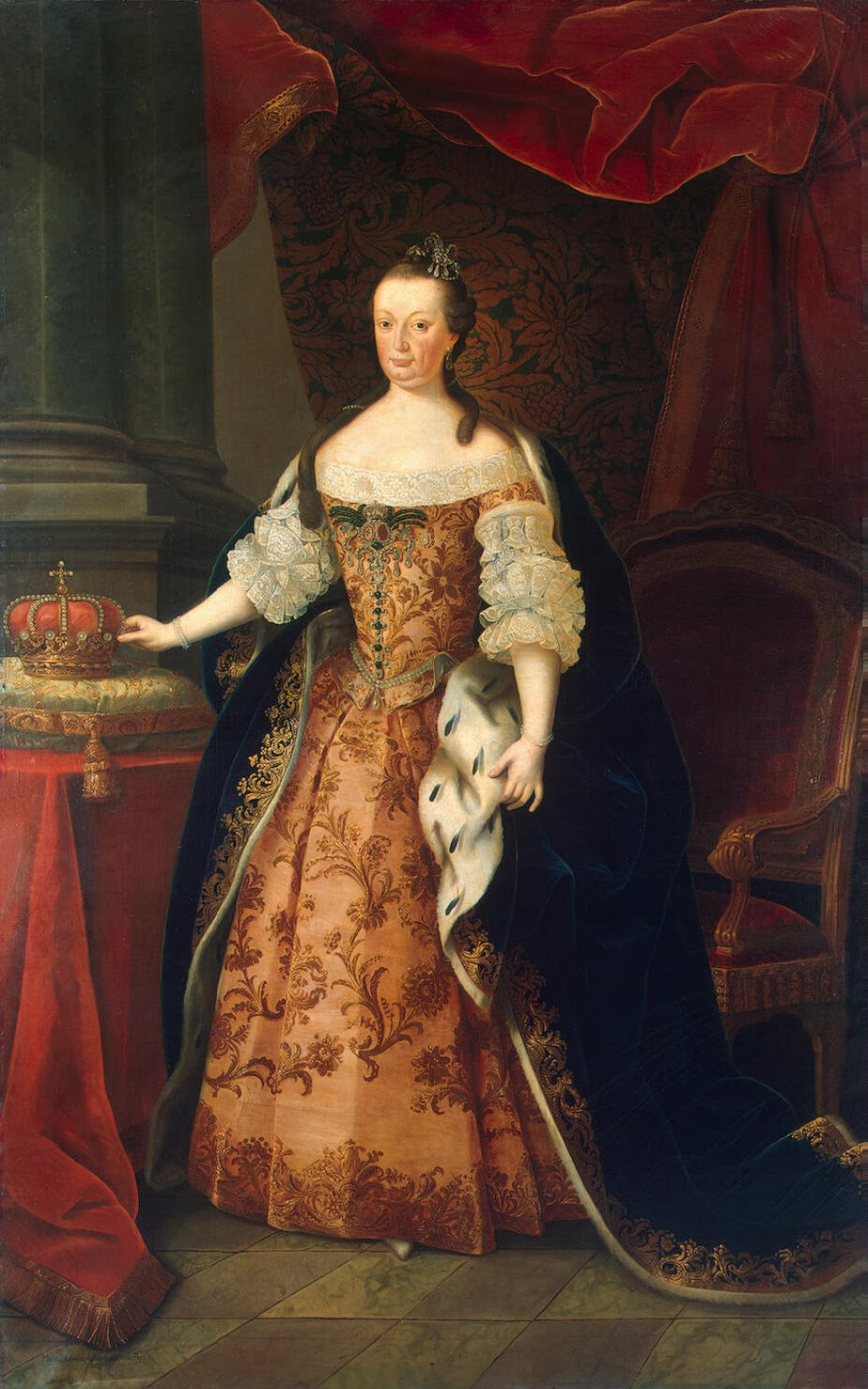
Portrait of Mariana Victoria (by Miguel António do Amaral, ca. 1773)

When her daughter had assumed government, Mariana Victoria took it upon herself to improve relations with her native Spain, which was ruled by her older brother Carlos III. The two countries had been in conflict regarding territorial possessions in the Americas. Leaving Portugal on 28 October 1777, Mariana Victoria travelled to Spain where she stayed for just over a year, residing both in Madrid and at Aranjuez. Mariana Victoria helped bring about a treaty between the two nations which was to be cemented by a double marriage between her grandchildren. These unions were between Charles III's son Infante Gabriel and Mariana Victoria's granddaughter the Infanta Mariana Vitória. The second marriage was between the Infanta Carlota, eldest granddaughter of Carlos III and Infante João. While in Spain, Mariana Victoria had had an attack of Rheumatism and used a wheelchair for some time in August 1778. She returned to Portugal in November 1778. Her condition worsened, and it became clear that she was suffering from heart disease as well. The elderly Mariana Victoria died at the Real Barraca de Ajuda, a building which is where the present Ajuda National Palace is, on 15 January 1781. She was buried at the Church of Saint Francis of Paola in Lisbon.

== Legacy ==
Mariana Victoria's arms: a composite of the Coat of arms of Portugal and of the House of Bourbon

She was the godmother of Marie Antoinette who was born a day after the 1755 Lisbon earthquake devastated Lisbon. Mariana Victoria has descendants ranging from the present King of Spain, King of Belgium, Grand Duke of Luxembourg, pretending Duke of Parma and the French Count of Paris. In 1822, her great-grandson Pedro became the first emperor of Brazil.

== Issue ==
1. Miscarriage (1733)
2. Maria Francisca Isabel Rita Gertrudes Joana (17 December 1734 – 20 March 1816), married her uncle Infante Peter of Portugal and had issue. Later Queen regnant of Portugal.
3. Maria Ana Francisca Dorotea Josefa Antonia Gertrudes Rita Joana Efigenia (7 October 1736 – 6 May 1813), potential bride for Louis, Dauphin of France, but her mother refused to consent to the marriage, died unmarried.
4. Maria Francisca Doroteia Josefa Antónia Gertrudes Rita Joana Efigénia de Braganza (21 September 1739 – 14 January 1771), potential bride for Philippe Égalité but she refused to marry him, died unmarried.
5. Stillborn son (7 March 1741).
6. Stillborn son (15 October 1742).
7. Miscarriage (1743)
8. Stillborn son (May 1744).
9. Maria Francisca Benedita Ana Isabel Joana Antonia Lourença Inácia Teresa Gertrudes Rita Rosa (25 July 1746 – 18 August 1829) married her nephew Infante Joseph, Prince of Beira, no surviving issue.
10. Miscarriage (1752)

== Ancestors ==
Ancestors of Mariana Victoria of Spain

8. Louis XIV of France
4. Louis, Dauphin of France
9. Maria Theresa of Austria
2. Philip V of Spain
10. Ferdinand Maria, Elector of Bavaria
5. Maria Anna Victoria of Bavaria
11. Henriette Adelaide of Savoy
1. Mariana Victoria of Spain
12. Ranuccio II Farnese, Duke of Parma
6. Odoardo Farnese, Hereditary Prince of Parma
13. Isabella d'Este
3. Elisabeth Farnese
14. Philip William, Elector Palatine
7. Dorothea Sophie of Neuburg
15. Elisabeth Amalie of Hesse-Darmstadt

== Bibliography ==
- Armstrong, Edward (1892). Elisabeth Farnese: The Termagant of Spain.
- Jackson-Laufer, Guida Myrl (1999). Women rulers throughout the ages: an illustrated guide. ABC-CLIO. ISBN 978-1-57607-091-8.
- Pevitt, Christine (1997). The Man Who Would Be King: The Life of Philippe d'Orléans, Regent of France. Phoenix, London. ISBN 978-0-7538-0459-9.
- Roberts, Jennifer (2009). The Madness of Queen Maria: The Remarkable Life of Maria I of Portugal. London: Templeton Press. ISBN 978-0-9545589-1-8.

Mariana Victoria of Spain House of Bourbon Cadet branch of the Capetian dynasty Born: 31 March 1718 Died: 15 January 1781
Portuguese royalty
Preceded by Maria Anna of Austria	Queen consort of Portugal; 31 July 1750 – 24 February 1777	Vacant Title next held by Carlota Joaquina of Spain
