= Vieira Lusitano =

Portuguese painter (1699–1783)

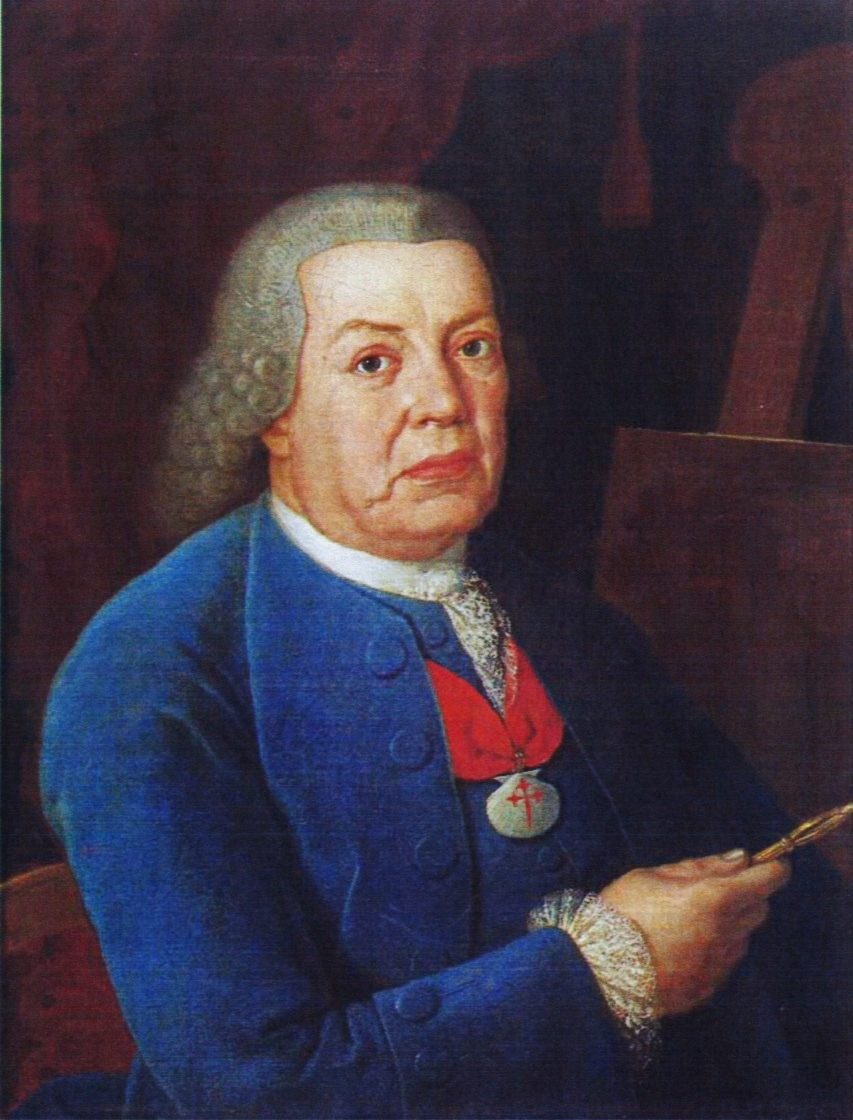
- Copy of a lost c. 1774 self-portrait, by Joaquim Manuel da Rocha (1727-1786)
- Born: Francisco de Matos Vieira; 4 October 1699; Lisbon, Kingdom of Portugal
- Died: 13 August 1783 (aged 83); Lisbon, Kingdom of Portugal
- Occupations: Court painter, illustrator and engraver

Francisco de Matos Vieira, better known as Vieira Lusitano (4 October 1699 – 13 August 1783) was a Portuguese court painter, illustrator and engraver.

== Biography ==
His father was a maker of socks and stockings. He was originally meant to pursue an ecclesiastical career, but when he displayed an aptitude for art, his parents changed their plans. Word of his talents reached Carnide, where some gentlemen who operated a literary academy asked to meet him. During his presentation to them, he met a girl named Inês Helena de Lima e Melo, who would become his lifelong passion.

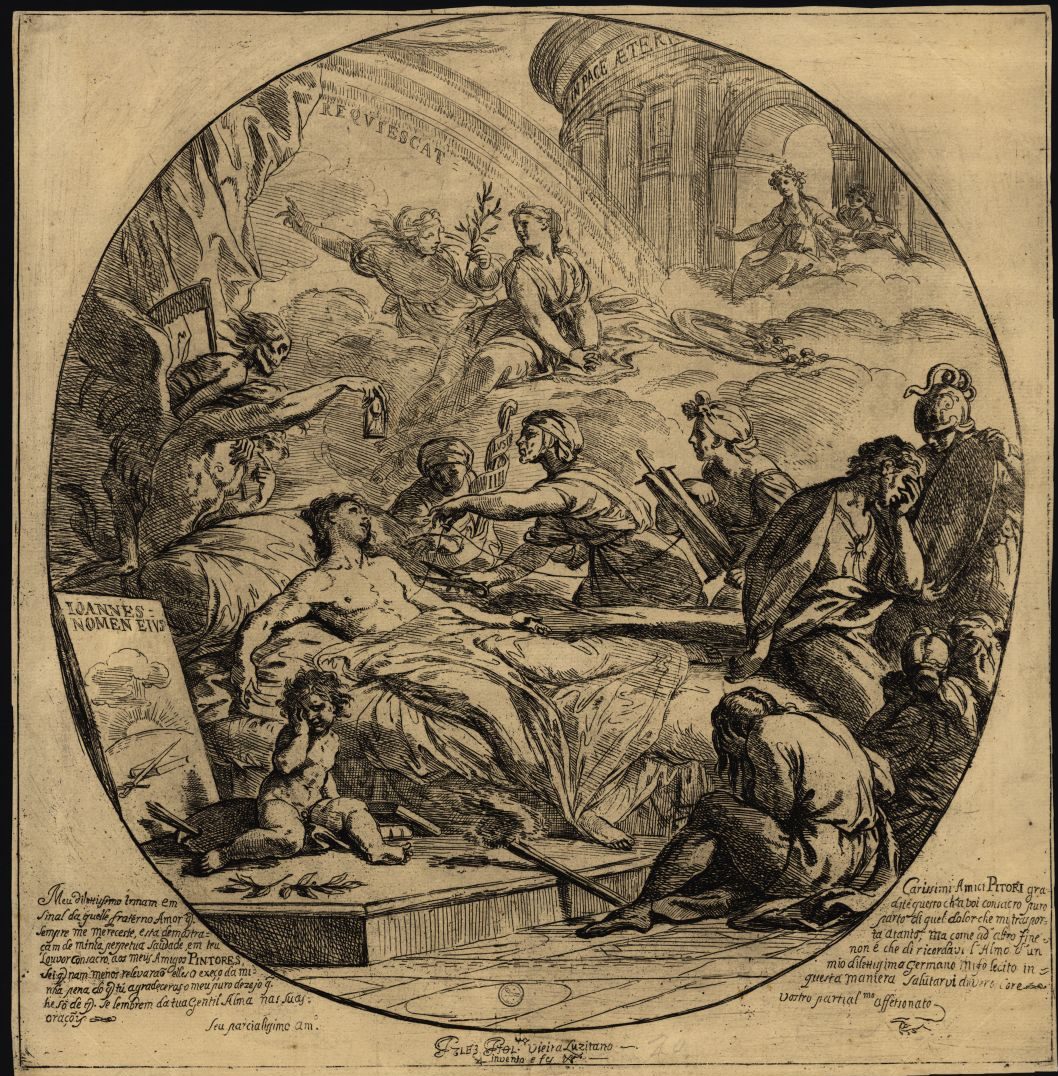
The Three Fates (late 1720s)

Meanwhile, he had begun his studies, probably with André Gonçalves. His work came to the attention of the Marquis of Fontes, who had recently been appointed Ambassador to Rome. The Marquis offered to take Vieira with him, so he could continue his studies there, and his family accepted the offer.

Once there, aged only thirteen, he was apprenticed to Benedetto Luti, who immediately set him to studying and copying the frescoes in the Farnese Gallery. Meanwhile, the Marquis directed him to paint religious ceremonies, ornaments at the Basilica of Saint Peter, fixtures at the Portuguese Embassy and even the Marquis' own carriage. When it came time for the Marquis to return home, he wanted to take Vieira with him, but relented when Vieira begged to remain. He was allowed to stay for two more years and studied with Francesco Trevisani.

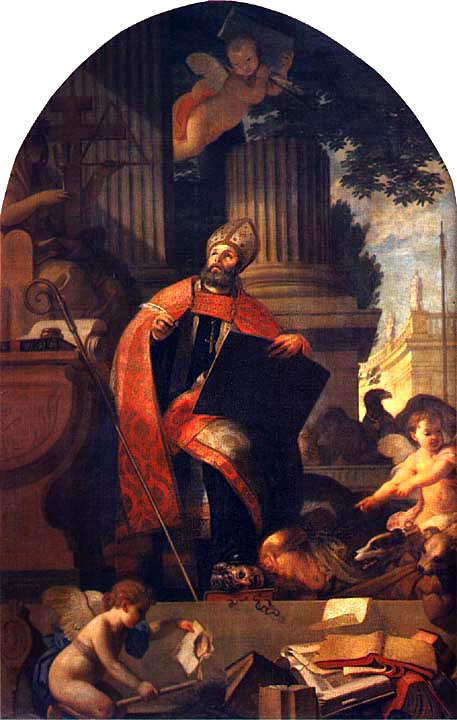
Saint Augustine (1770)

=== Marriage and its aftermath ===
Returning home after seven years, he was commissioned by King John V to paint a large "Blessed Sacrament" for the Corpus Christi procession. His relationship with Inês was not going well, however, as her parents felt that he was of inferior social status and they would not consent to the marriage. Despite this, they arranged a marriage by proxy. When her parents found out, they took her to a convent and forced her to take vows. Vieira tried to gain her release but, failing that, decided to appeal to the Pope himself. He remained in Rome for five years, pressing his petitions and continuing to paint.

Finally acknowledging defeat, he returned to Lisbon in 1728. Somehow, he arranged to have male clothing smuggled in to Inês so, dressed as a man, she simply walked out of the convent. When it was discovered that she was missing, her relatives hired a hooligan to avenge their honor. Vieira was shot as he walked down the street and seriously injured. When he recovered, he sought justice from King John V, but his wife's family was influential and the would-be assassin was allowed to flee the country. Fearing for his safety, Vieira entered the Paulist convent then, in 1732, went to Seville, to work for King Philip V.

=== Court Painter ===
Upon his return to Lisbon the following year, he was named Court Painter and retained that position under King Joseph I. In 1744, he was appointed Knight of the Order of Saint James of the Sword. During his tenure with the court, he painted portraits of the royal family, and worked prolifically at numerous public buildings and churches. Many of those works were destroyed in the earthquake of 1755.

In 1775, his beloved Inês died. Stricken with grief, he gave up painting and entered the Convento do Beato, where he remained until his death. While there, he composed a long poem in lyrical cantos called O insigne pintor e leal esposo, história verdadeira... (Illustrious painter and loyal husband, a true story). It was printed in 1780. That same year, he accepted a largely honorary appointment as Director of the "Nude Academy" (later, the "Royal Academy of Fine Arts").

== Portraits of the Royal Family ==
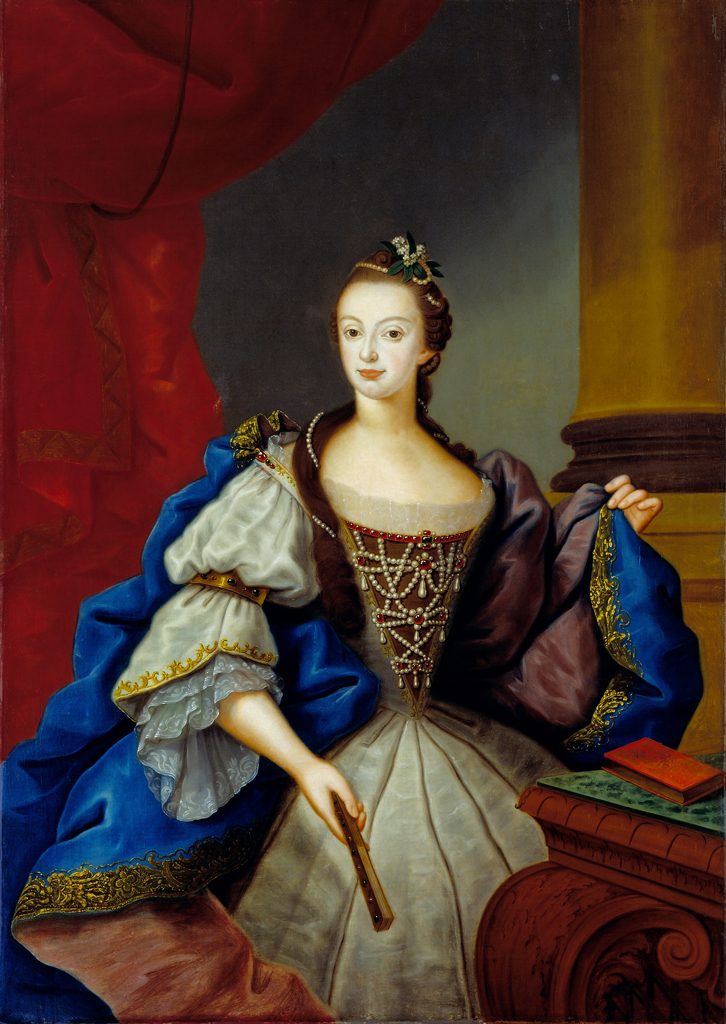
Maria I of Portugal

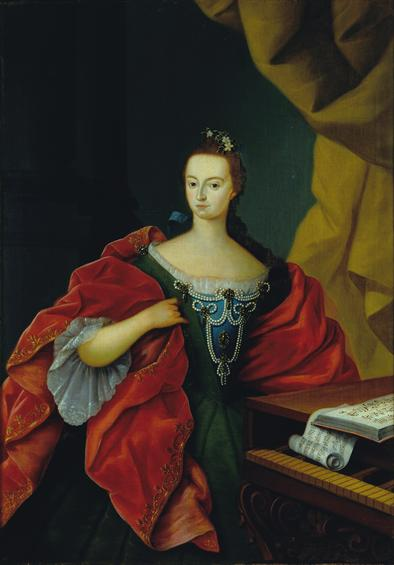
Infanta Maria Ana Francisca of Portugal

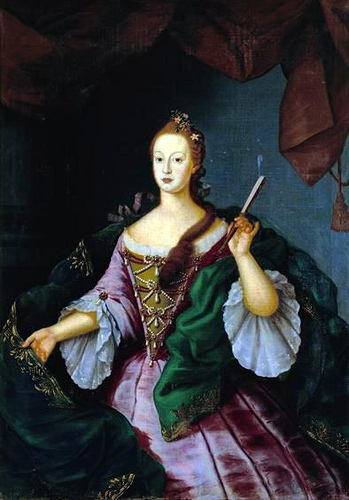
Infanta Maria Doroteia of Portugal

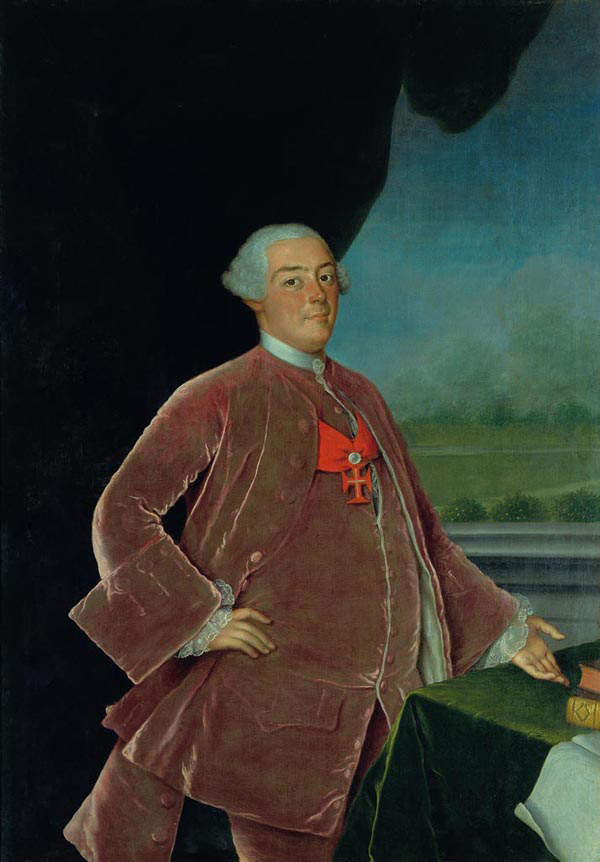
Peter III of Portugal
