= Infanta Maria Ana of Braganza =

Portuguese infanta (1736–1813)

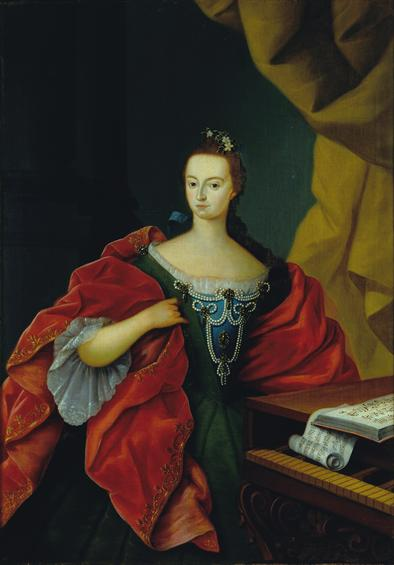
- Portrait by Vieira Lusitano
- Born: 7 October 1736; Lisbon, Kingdom of Portugal
- Died: 16 May 1813 (aged 76); Rio de Janeiro, State of Brazil
- Burial: Royal Pantheon of the Braganza Dynasty
Names
- Portuguese: Maria Ana Francisca Josefa Rita Joana
- House: House of Braganza
- Father: Joseph I of Portugal
- Mother: Mariana Victoria of Spain

Maria Ana of Braganza (Maria Ana Francisca Josefa Rita Joana; 7 October 1736 – 16 May 1813) was a Portuguese infanta, daughter of King Joseph I of Portugal and Mariana Victoria of Spain.

== Biography ==
Maria Ana was born in Lisbon on October 7, 1736, and was the second of four daughters of Joseph I.

The Infanta was considered a potential bride for Louis, Dauphin of France, but her mother refused to consent to the marriage because of her own history, having been bethrothed by Louis XV, who had broken their engagement and sent her back from France. She never married, but engaged in her interests in the arts and in the rebuilding of the famous convent school Convento do Desagravo do Santíssimo Sacramento in Lisbon, which had been destroyed in the famous earthquake of 1757, and which she was able to re-inaugurate in 1783.

She escaped from mainland Portugal with her family when Napoleon Bonaparte ordered the invasion of Portugal. Like her sister the queen, she suffered from a mental illness during her last years, and was cared for in Brazil by her sister Benedita, who lived with her. She died in Rio de Janeiro on May 16, 1813, and was moved to Lisbon.
