= Infanta Doroteia of Braganza =

Portuguese princess

Infanta Doroteia
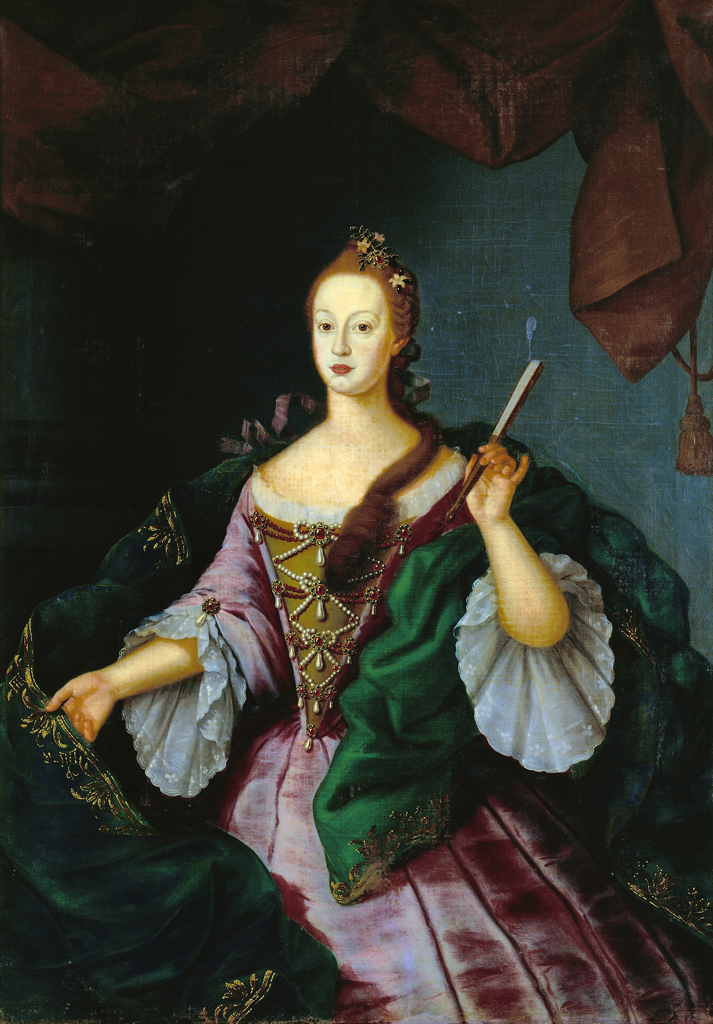
- Portrait by Vieira Lusitano
- Born: 21 September 1739; Lisbon, Kingdom of Portugal
- Died: 14 January 1771 (aged 31); Lisbon, Kingdom of Portugal
- Burial: Royal Pantheon of the Braganza Dynasty
Names
- Portuguese: Maria Francisca Doroteia Josefa Antónia Gertrudes Rita Joana Efigénia de Bragança
- House: Braganza
- Father: Joseph I of Portugal
- Mother: Mariana Victoria of Spain

Doroteia of Braganza (21 September 1739 – 14 January 1771) was a Portuguese infanta as the daughter of King Joseph I of Portugal and Mariana Victoria of Spain.

== Life ==
Doroteia was born on 21 September 1739 in Lisbon. She was the third of four daughters of Joseph I of Portugal and Mariana Victoria of Spain. She was named after her great-grandmother, Dorothea Sophie of Neuburg.

Doroteia was a proposed bride for Philippe d'Orléans, Duke of Orléans (later known as Philippe Égalité), but her mother refused to consent to the match.

In 1764, she became ill in a condition described as “hysteric, accompanied by an almost total lack of appetite which has reduced her to a state of extreme weakness.” She was subjected to numerous bleedings before dying in Lisbon on 14 January 1771. Her body was moved to the national pantheon in the Monastery of São Vicente de Fora, in Lisbon.

== Ancestry ==
Ancestors of Infanta Doroteia of Braganza

8. Peter II of Portugal
4. John V of Portugal
9. Maria Sophia of Neuburg
2. Joseph I of Portugal
10. Leopold I, Holy Roman Emperor
5. Maria Anna of Austria
11. Eleonore Magdalene of Neuburg
1. Maria Francisca Doroteia of Braganza
12. Louis, Dauphin of France
6. Philip V of Spain
13. Maria Anna Victoria of Bavaria
3. Mariana Victoria of Spain
14. Odoardo Farnese, Hereditary Prince of Parma
7. Elisabeth Farnese
15. Dorothea Sophie of Neuburg
