= Infanta Benedita of Braganza =

Princess of Brazil

Infanta Benedita
- Princess of Brazil (more...)
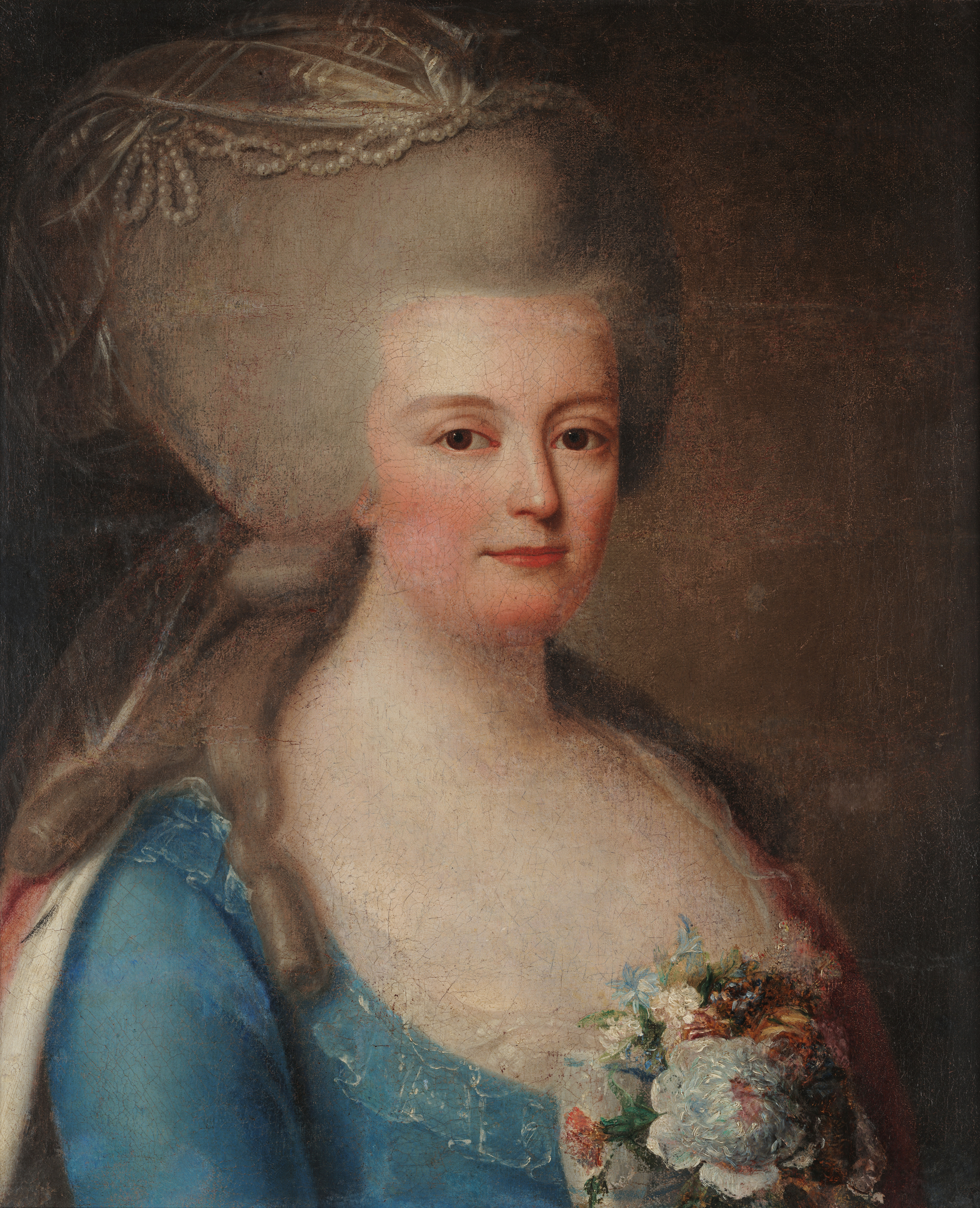
- Portrait, c. 1785-1790
- Born: 25 July 1746; Lisbon, Kingdom of Portugal
- Died: 18 August 1829 (aged 83); Lisbon, Kingdom of Portugal
- Burial: Royal Pantheon of the Braganza Dynasty
- Spouse: José, Prince of Brazil (m. 1777; died 1788)
Names
- Maria Francisca Benedita Ana Isabel Josefa Antónia Lourença Inácia Teresa Gertrudes Rita Joana Rosa de Bragança
- Father: Joseph I of Portugal
- Mother: Mariana Victoria of Spain

Infanta Benedita of Braganza (Maria Francisca Benedita Ana Isabel Antónia Lourença Inácia Teresa Gertrudes Rita Rosa; 25 July 1746 – 18 August 1829) was a Portuguese infanta and the youngest daughter of King Joseph I of Portugal and Mariana Victoria of Spain. She was the Crown Princess of Portugal by marriage to her nephew José, Prince of Brazil between 1777 and 1786.

== Early life ==
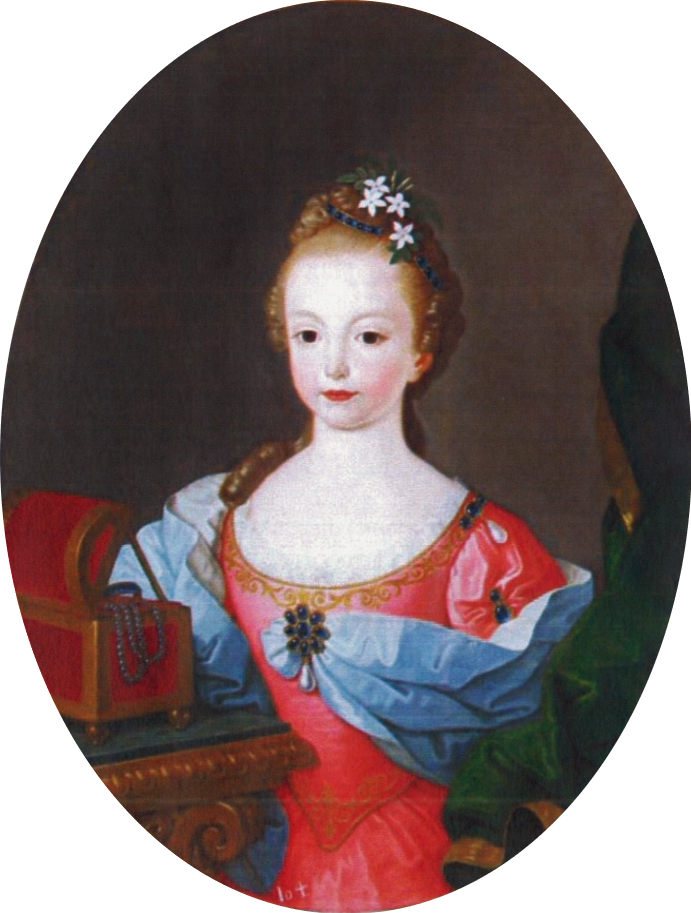
Maria Benedita at age 7, by Vieira Lusitano.

Born in Lisbon on 25 July 1746, Benedita was the fourth daughter of Joseph I of Portugal and Mariana Victoria of Spain. At her baptism, officiated by Tomás de Almeida on August 10, 1746, Pope Benedict XIV was named her godfather.

Benedita was well educated, with a focus on religion and accomplishments in the arts. She was educated in music by Davide Perez and in painting by Domingos Sequeira: a panel made by her and her sister can still be seen in the Estrela Basilica un Lisbon. She attended the accession of her father to the throne in 1750, and the wedding of her sister to their uncle in 1760. In contrast to her siblings, who all experienced physical and mental conditions of some kind during their lives, Benedita was in good physical and mental health during her entire life.

== Crown Princess ==
There were discussions to arranged a marriage between Benedita and Ferdinand VI of Spain as well as with Joseph II, Holy Roman Emperor, but the negotiations did not succeed. It was the wish of her father that she should marry her nephew, and in 1775, he successfully obtained a Papal dispensation to arrange the marriage if he deemed it necessary, which he did two years later.

On 21 February 1777, she married her nephew, José, Prince of Beira, heir apparent of the heiress presumptive (and proclaimed heir, i.e. her sister Maria) to the throne of Portugal, as the eldest son of the future Queen Maria I. After the wedding, she was prepared and undressed for the wedding night by her sister and now mother-in-law. Benedita was an attractive woman of thirty, while José was fifteen. Alberto Pimentel wrote:

"D. Maria Benedicta was still beautiful, and quite intelligent, and understood the energetic and noble soul of her nephew who, for his part, had shown himself since childhood very affectionate towards this sister of his mother. They loved each other because they understood each other."

Three days after their wedding, Benedita's father King Joseph died, and her sister Maria succeeded him as queen regnant. Infante José became the new crown prince, being given the titles Prince of Brazil and 16th Duke of Braganza. Benedita became crown princess with the title Princess of Brazil. The marriage was mentioned as shocking by some foreign visitors to Portugal at the time, but there were no opposition to it in Portugal. While it was uncommon for nephews to marry their aunts, it was not uncommon for uncles to marry their nieces at that time period, and there were several examples of marriages between uncles and nieces in the Royal Houses: her own sister and mother-in-law the queen had married their uncle in 1760.

They had no children, however Benedita miscarried twice: firstly in 1781 and secondly in 1786. After her second miscarriage, there were rumours of an annulment due to the absence of children: however, since José had a brother, it was not strictly necessary for him to have a son or daughter as his heir.

== Later life and death ==
In 1788, her husband José died and Benedita became Dowager Princess of Brazil, as she was known during the rest of her long life. Her sister the queen provided her with a generous allowance. As a widow, Benedita lived a discreet and non-controversial life at court. She had no influence on the affairs of state and did not show any interest in acquiring any. She devoted herself to charitable enterprises. In contrast to other dowagers, who traditionally founded convents and churches, she chose to found the Royal Hospital for the Military Disabled of Runa.

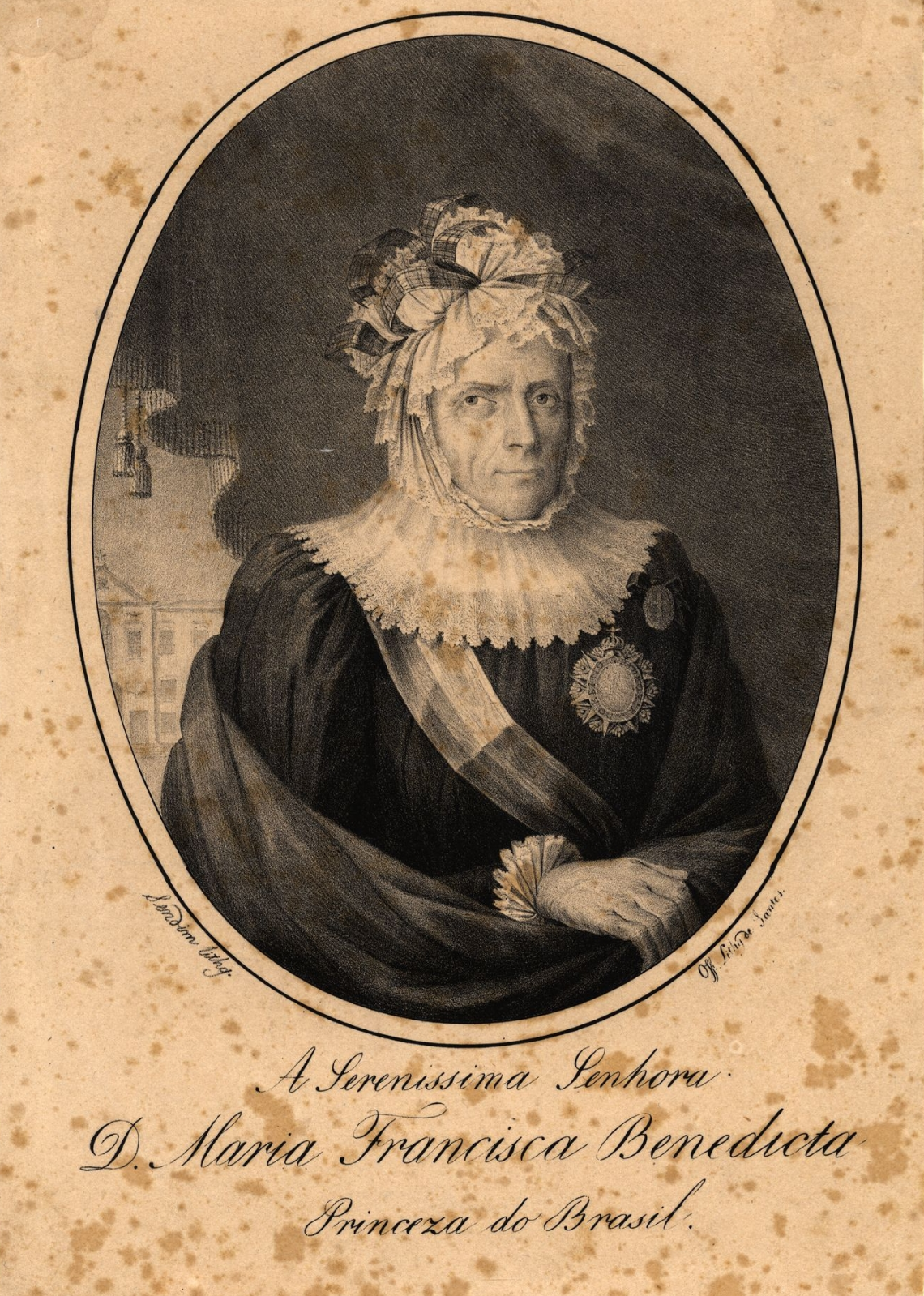
Princess Dowager Benedicta in c. 1829, the year of her death

She followed the royal family on their exile to Brazil in 1807. In Brazil, she settled with her sister Maria Ana in Botafogo. She continued to live a quiet life as she had in Portugal, stayed out of politics and devoted herself to charity. Although her income decreased significantly during this period, she sent money to Portugal several times to ensure ongoing construction of the hospital in Runa.

While her sisters suffered from mental problems, Benedita was described as of a robust and stable mental health, though of a silent and discreet disposition. She finally returned to Portugal in 1821, where she spent her last eight years.

Benedita died in Lisbon at the Palace of Ajuda on 18 August 1829. Two days later, she was buried in the national pantheon at the Monastery of São Vicente de Fora. In her will, she left most of her assets to the Royal Hospital in Runa and divided her vast jewelry collection among her relatives and servants. She was the last surviving grandchild of John V of Portugal.

== Ancestors ==
Ancestors of Infanta Benedita of Braganza

8. Peter II of Portugal
4. John V of Portugal
9. Maria Sophia of Neuburg
2. Joseph I of Portugal
10. Leopold I, Holy Roman Emperor
5. Maria Anna of Austria
11. Eleonore Magdalene of Neuburg
1. Infanta Benedita of Braganza
12. Louis, Dauphin of France
6. Philip V of Spain
13. Maria Anna Victoria of Bavaria
3. Mariana Victoria of Spain
14. Odoardo Farnese, Hereditary Prince of Parma
7. Elisabeth Farnese
15. Dorothea Sophie of Neuburg
