= Pedro, Prince of Brazil =

Pedro
- Prince of Brazil, Duke of Braganza (more...)
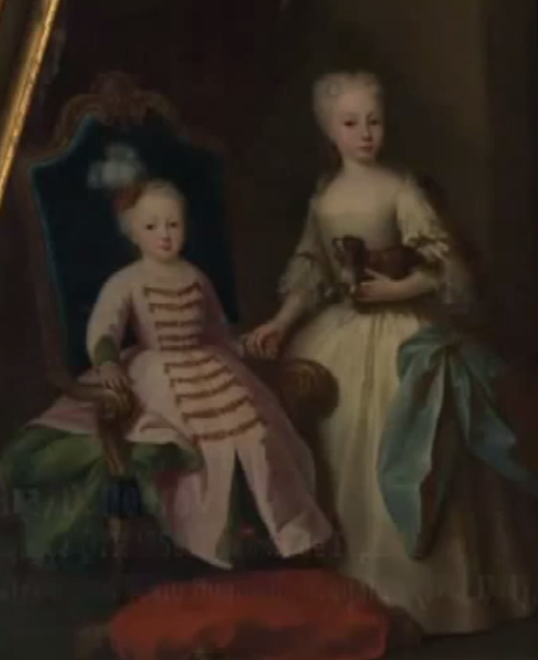
- Prince Pedro (seated) and his older sister, Infanta Barbara; by Domenico Duprà.
- Born: 19 October 1712; Lisbon, Portugal
- Died: 29 October 1714 (aged 2); Lisbon, Portugal
- Burial: Royal Pantheon, Lisbon, Portugal
Names
- Pedro de Alcântara Francisco António João Carlos Xavier de Paula Miguel Rafael
- House: House of Braganza
- Father: John V of Portugal
- Mother: Maria Anna of Austria

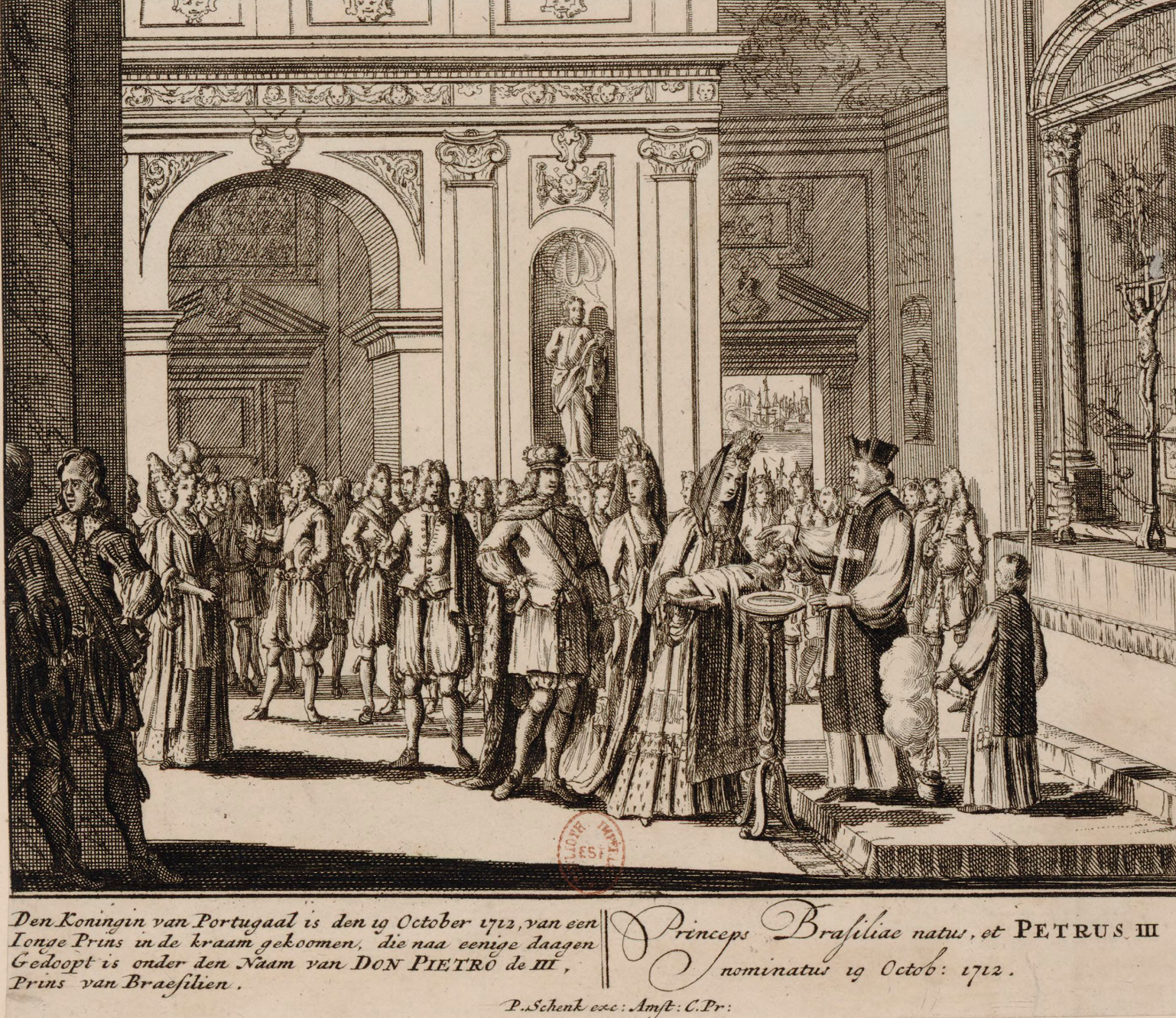
The Royal Family at the Baptism of Pedro, Prince of Brazil; c. 1712

Pedro, Prince of Brazil (Lisbon, 19 October 1712 – Lisbon, 29 October 1714) was the second child of John V of Portugal and Maria Ana of Austria. He was made Prince of Brazil and Duke of Braganza upon his birth. He died at the age of two, making his brother Joseph (future Joseph I of Portugal) the new Prince of Brazil.

== Ancestry ==
Ancestors of Pedro, Prince of Brazil

8. John IV of Portugal
4. Peter II of Portugal
9. Luisa de Guzmán
2. John V of Portugal
10. Philip William, Elector Palatine
5. Maria Sophia of Neuburg
11. Elisabeth Amalie of Hesse-Darmstadt
1. Pedro, Prince of Brazil
12. Ferdinand III, Holy Roman Emperor
6. Leopold I, Holy Roman Emperor
13. Maria Anna of Austria
3. Maria Anna of Austria
14. Philip William, Elector Palatine (= 10)
7. Eleonore Magdalene of Neuburg
15. Elisabeth Amalie of Hesse-Darmstadt (= 11)
