= José, Prince of Brazil =

Heir apparent to the Portuguese throne (1761–1788)

José
- Prince of Brazil (more...)
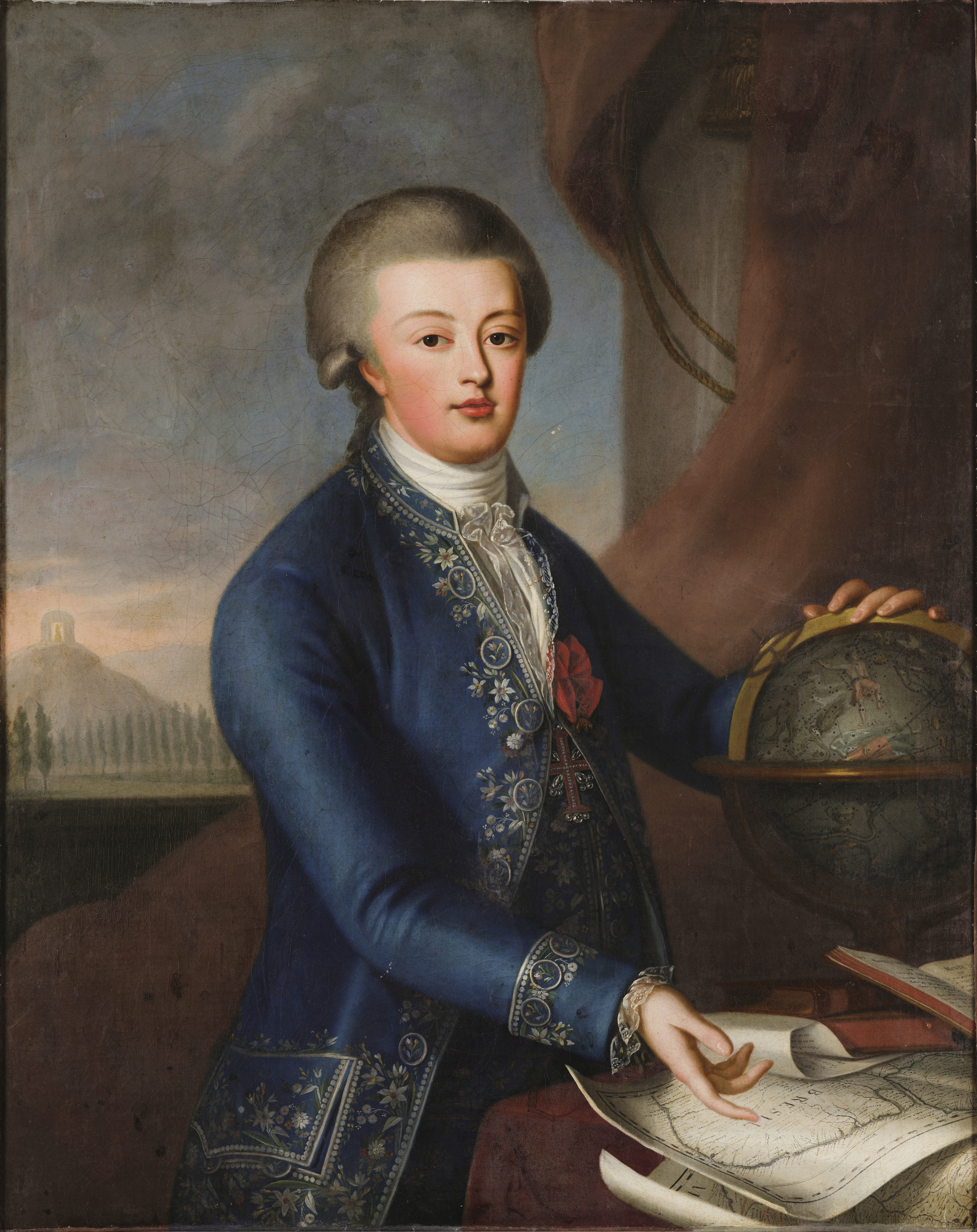
- Portrait of José c. 1775–1788
- Born: 20 August 1761; Real Barraca da Ajuda, Lisbon, Portugal
- Died: 11 September 1788 (aged 27); Real Barraca da Ajuda, Lisbon, Portugal
- Burial: Pantheon of the House of Braganza, Lisbon, Portugal
- Spouse: Infanta Benedita of Portugal (m. 1777)
Names
- José Francisco Xavier de Paula Domingos António Agostinho Anastácio
- House: Braganza
- Father: Pedro III of Portugal
- Mother: Maria I of Portugal

Dom José, Prince of Brazil, Duke of Braganza (Portuguese pronunciation: [ʒuˈzɛ]; 20 August 1761 – 11 September 1788) was the heir apparent to the Kingdom of Portugal until his death in 1788, as the eldest child of Queen Dona Maria I of Portugal and King Dom Pedro III of Portugal, (Note: When José was born, his parents were not King and Queen yet, but the Prince and Princess of Brazil) members of the House of Braganza.

José died of smallpox at the age of 27, causing his younger and ill-prepared brother, Infante João, to become heir apparent, Prince Regent to their mentally ill mother and eventually King. João's regency and reign would be a turbulent one, seeing the Napoleonic invasion of Portugal and the loss of the Portuguese Empire's largest and wealthiest colony, Brazil.

== Early life ==
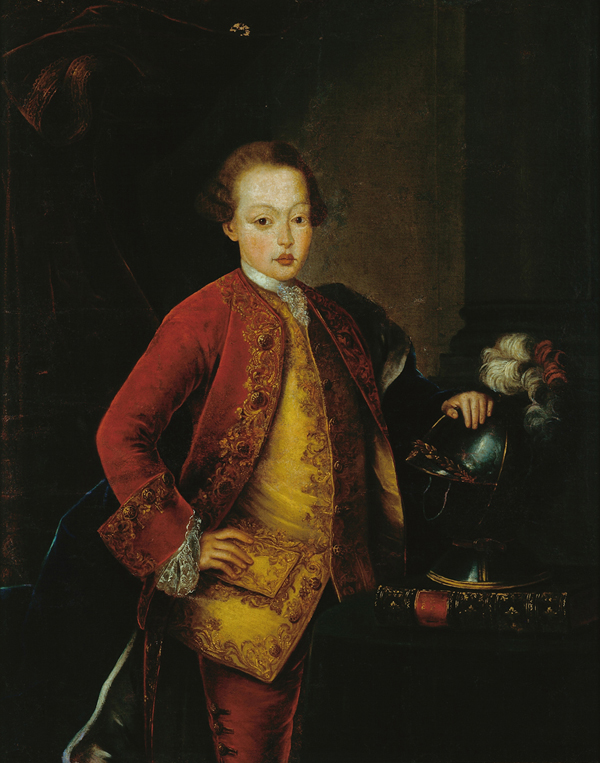
José at the age of 13 (1774)

The first child of Princess Maria of Portugal and her husband Prince Peter, José was born at the Real Barraca shortly before midnight on 20 August 1761. He was named after his grandfather who was the ruling King of Portugal at the time of his birth. His grandfather created him Prince of Beira, this being the first time when the title was given to a male.

At the time of his birth, his parents were the Prince and Princess of Brazil, his mother the Heir presumptive of the king.

Marquis de Pombal, King Joseph's leading minister, appointed Manuel do Cenáculo to serve as José's confessor and tutor. José was taught history, geography, geometry, and law.

== Marriage ==
On 21 February 1777, when he was 15 years old, he married his 30-year-old aunt the Infanta Benedita of Portugal. Benedita was an attractive woman and the main candidate for the wife of José. The marriage was the wish of the dying king, Dom José.

They had no children; she miscarried twice, in 1781 and in 1786. Three days after their wedding, José's grandfather and Benedita's father the old King José died, and his mother succeeded as queen regnant. Infante José became the new crown prince, being accorded the titles Prince of Brazil and 14th Duke of Braganza.

== Death and legacy ==
Royal styles of José, Prince of Brazil
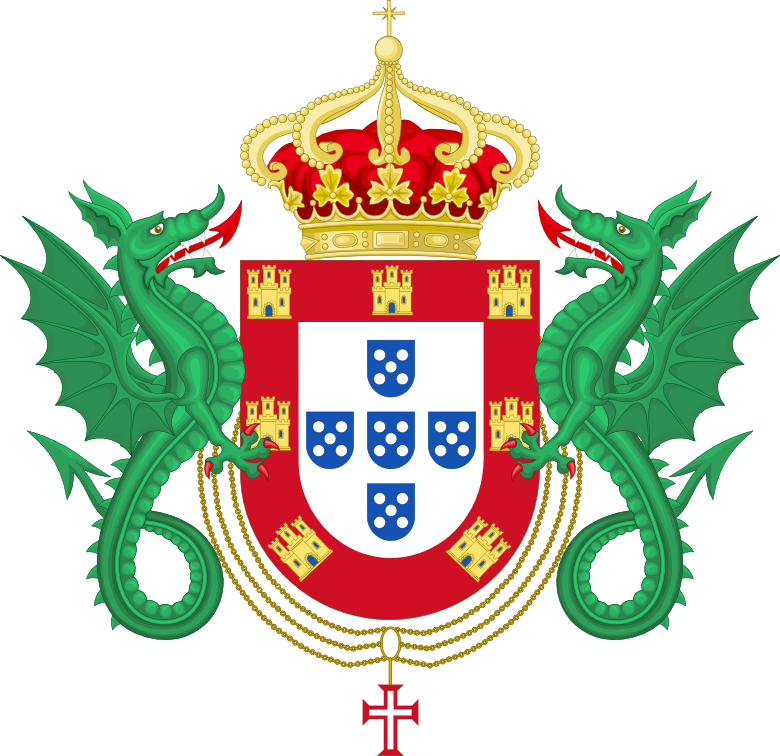
- Reference style: His Royal Highness
- Spoken style: Your Royal Highness

José died at the age of 27 of smallpox. Upon José's death, his younger brother Infante John became heir-apparent to the throne and thus the new Prince of Brazil. José died on the Ajuda Royal Complex in Lisbon. His mother and wife were very badly affected by his death. His wife would be known as the "Dowager Princess of Brazil" till her death in 1829.

José is buried in the Pantheon of the House of Braganza in Lisbon, the resting place for most of the members of the House of Braganza.

== Honours ==
- Kingdom of Portugal: Grand Commander of the Three Military Orders of Christ, Aviz and St. James
- Spain: Knight of the Golden Fleece, 10 May 1785

== Ancestors ==
Ancestors of José, Prince of Brazil

8. Peter II of Portugal
4. John V of Portugal
9. Maria Sophia of Neuburg
2. Peter III of Portugal
10. Leopold I, Holy Roman Emperor
5. Maria Anna of Austria
11. Eleonore Magdalene of Neuburg
1. José, Prince of Brazil
12. John V of Portugal (= 4)
6. Joseph I of Portugal
13. Maria Anna of Austria (= 5)
3. Maria I of Portugal
14. Philip V of Spain
7. Mariana Victoria of Spain
15. Elisabeth Farnese

== Footnotes ==
José, Prince of Brazil House of Braganza Cadet branch of the House of Aviz Born: 20 August 1761 Died: 11 September 1788
Portuguese royalty
Preceded by Maria Francisca	Prince of Beira; Duke of Barcelos; 20 August 1761— 24 February 1777	Succeeded by Maria Teresa
Preceded by Maria I	Prince of Brazil; Duke of Braganza; 24 February 1777— 11 September 1788	Succeeded by John VI
