= Joseph I of Portugal =

King of Portugal from 1750 to 1777

Joseph I
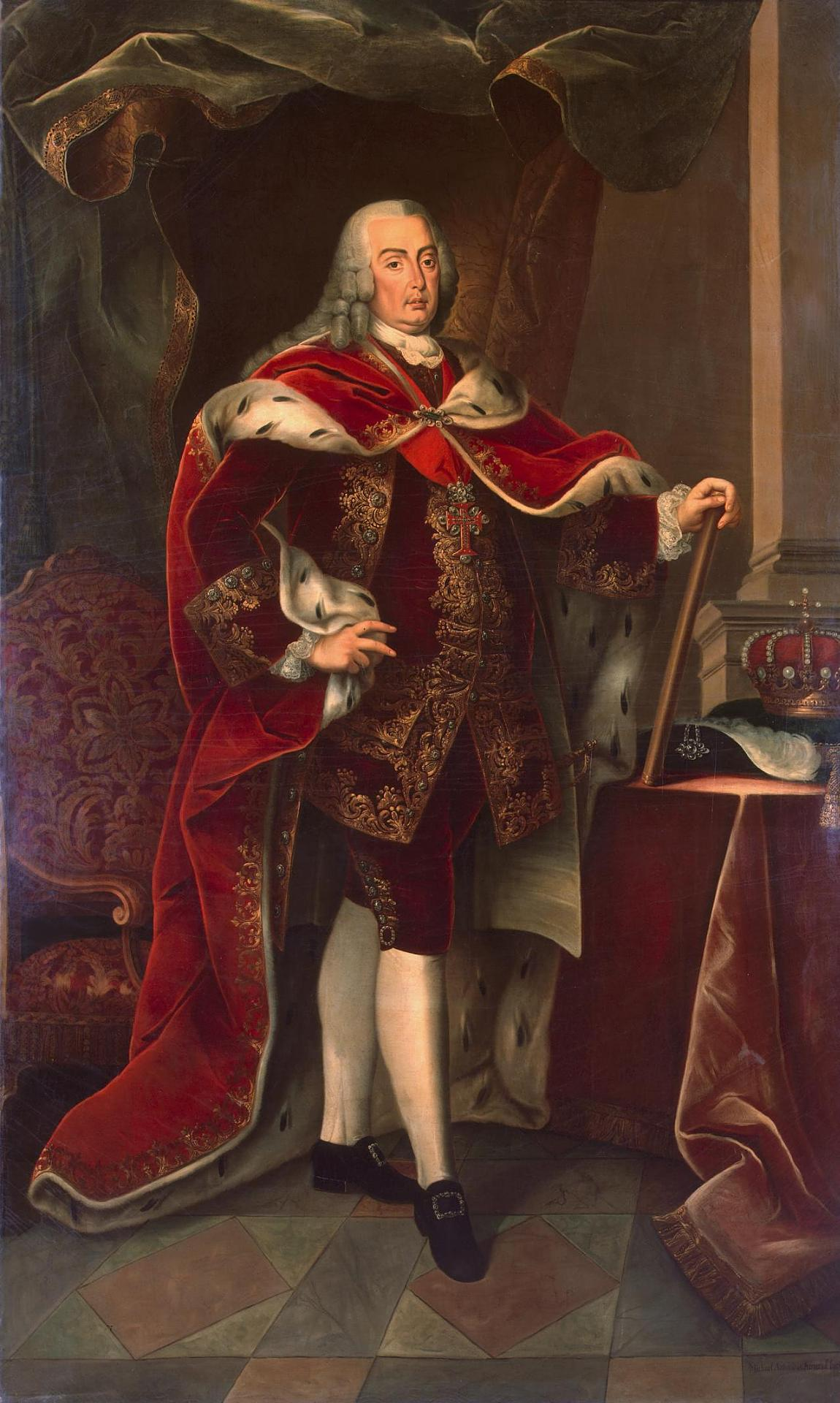
- Portrait, c. 1773

King of Portugal
- Reign: 31 July 1750 – 24 February 1777
- Acclamation: 8 September 1750, Lisbon
- Predecessor: John V
- Successors: Maria I and Peter III
- Chief minister: Marquis of Pombal (1756–1777)
- Born: 6 June 1714; Ribeira Palace, Lisbon, Portugal
- Died: 24 February 1777 (aged 62); Sintra Palace, Sintra, Portugal
- Burial: Pantheon of the House of Braganza
- Spouse: Mariana Victoria of Spain (m. 1729)
- Issue: Maria I of Portugal; Infanta Mariana; Infanta Doroteia; Benedita, Princess of Brazil
Names
- Portuguese: José Francisco António Inácio Norberto Agostinho; English: Joseph Francis Anthony Ignatius Norbert Augustine
- House: Braganza
- Father: John V of Portugal
- Mother: Maria Anna of Austria

Dom Joseph I (Portuguese: José Francisco António Inácio Norberto Agostinho; 6 June 1714 – 24 February 1777), known as the Reformer (Portuguese: o Reformador), was King of Portugal from 31 July 1750 until his death in 1777. Among other activities, he was devoted to hunting and the opera. His government was controlled by Sebastião José de Carvalho e Melo, 1st Marquis of Pombal, who implemented new laws, modernized the economy and Portuguese society, marking Joseph's reign as a time of modernization of Portugal.

The third child and second son of King John V, Joseph became his father's heir as an infant when his older brother, Pedro, Prince of Brazil, died. In 1729, he married Infanta Mariana Victoria, the eldest daughter of Philip V of Spain. They had four daughters: Maria, Mariana, Doroteia, and Benedita.

With the death of his father in 1750, Joseph became king of Portugal. When he ascended the throne, Joseph I had at his disposal the same means of government action as his predecessors in the 17th century, despite the economic progress made in the country in the first half of the 18th century. This inadequacy of the country's administrative, legal and political structures, together with the poor economic conditions inherited from the last years of the reign of John V, forced the monarch to choose his collaborators from among those who were known for their opposition to the policies followed in the previous reign.

His reign witnessed, among other things, a deadly earthquake in Lisbon in 1755 and a Spanish-French invasion of Portugal in 1762. The Lisbon earthquake allowed the Marquis of Pombal to consolidate power and also caused King Joseph to develop claustrophobia, refusing to live in a walled building ever again. Afterwards, Joseph moved his court into a series of tents. A new palace was built for him in Lisbon in the aftermath of the earthquake, but this was left incomplete. Joseph died in 1777 and was succeeded by his eldest daughter, Queen Dona Maria I.

== Early life ==
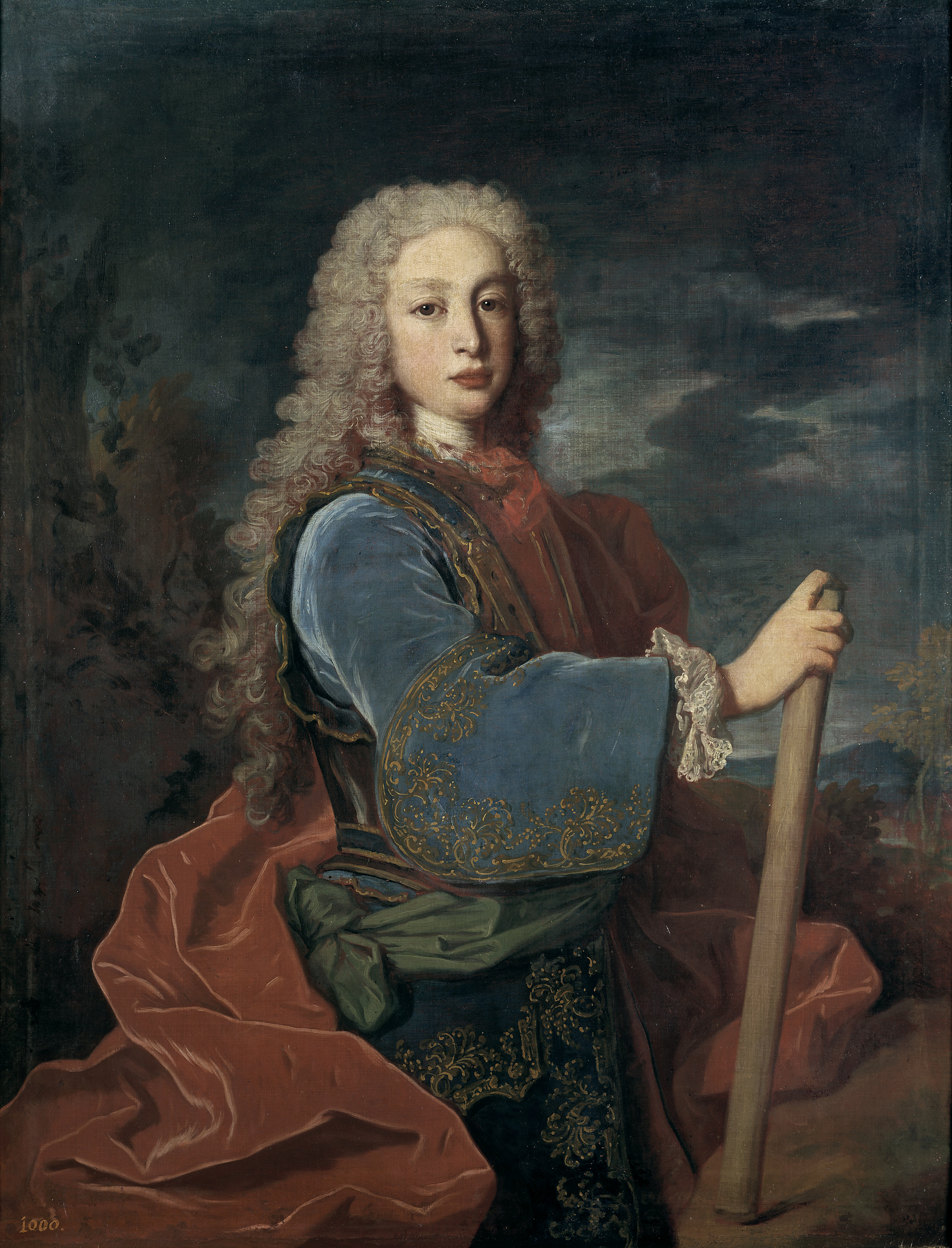
Portrait by Jean Ranc, 1729

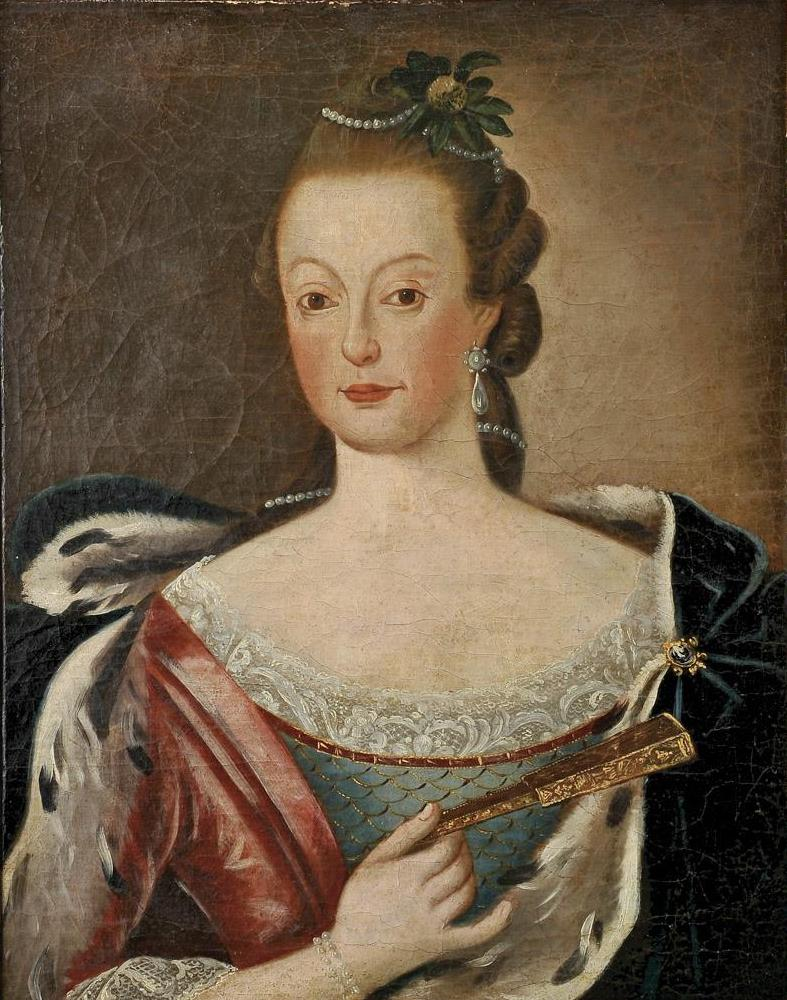
His wife Mariana Victoria of Spain

Joseph was the third child of King John V of Portugal and his wife Maria Anna of Austria. He had an older brother Pedro, Prince of Brazil, an older sister Barbara and three younger brothers. When his brother Pedro died in 1714 at the age of two, Joseph became heir apparent with the titles of Prince of Brazil and Duke of Braganza.

=== Marriage ===
On 19 January 1729, Joseph married Infanta Mariana Victoria of Spain, daughter of King Philip V of Spain and Elisabeth Farnese, and his elder sister Barbara married King Philip's son and heir, Ferdinand, Prince of Asturias (later King Ferdinand VI of Spain). The ceremony became known as the Exchange of the Princesses. Mariana Victoria loved music and hunting, just like her husband, but she was also a serious woman who disapproved of Joseph's love affairs and did not hesitate to expose them to acquaintances. They had four daughters, all born before Joseph ascended the throne.

== Reign ==
Joseph succeeded to the Portuguese throne in 1750, when he was 36 years old, and almost immediately placed effective power in the hands of Sebastião José de Carvalho e Melo (in 1770, the king made him Marquis of Pombal). Indeed, the history of Joseph's reign is really that of the Marquis of Pombal himself. The king's eldest daughter, Maria Francisca, became heir presumptive with the title of Princess of Brazil.

=== Victory over Spain and France (1762) ===
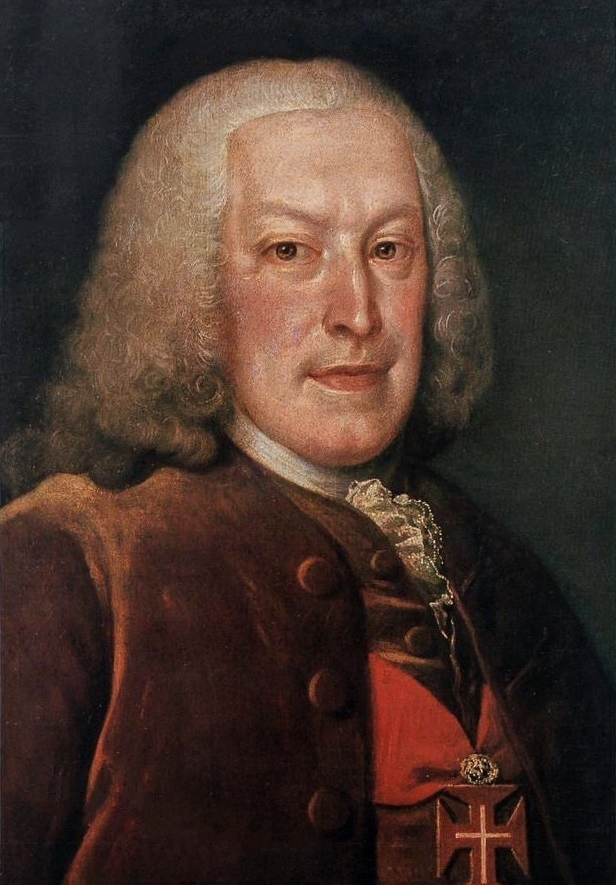
Sebastião José de Carvalho e Melo, 1st Marquis of Pombal, the chief minister of Joseph I and de facto ruler of Portugal

One of the most difficult situations faced by the king was the Franco-Spanish invasion of Portugal, in the end of the Seven Years' War (5 May-24 November 1762). France and Spain sent an ultimatum in order to force Portugal to abandon its alliance with Great Britain and close her ports to British ships. King Joseph refused to submit and asked for British help since both Portugal and its army were in a very poor condition, mainly because of the great 1755 Lisbon earthquake. Britain sent a force of 7,104 men led by John Campbell, 4th Earl of Loudoun, and John Burgoyne, and also the exceptional military leader William, Count of Schaumburg-Lippe, which reformed the Portuguese army and led the allied army of 14–15,000 men in a victorious war. The Bourbon invaders first led by Nicolás de Carvajal, Marquis of Sarriá, and then by Pedro Pablo Abarca de Bolea, Count of Aranda, were thrice defeated by a combination of popular uprising, scorched earth strategy/famine and encircling movements by the regular Anglo-Portuguese troops, which like the militia, skilfully used the mountainous terrain to their advantage. The Spanish and French troops suffered staggering losses when they were driven out from Portugal and chased into Spain. As synthesized by historian Walter Dorn:

… Effort of the Bourbon powers to set up the beginnings of a 'continental system' by sending a summons to Portugal to close her ports to British ships and exclude Englishmen from Brazil trade. But the Portuguese minister, the Marquis of Pombal, refused, and with the assistance of Count Lippe and the English General Burgoyne broke the offensive of the Spanish invading army. D'Aranda, the Spanish General, was forced to retreat in disgrace. With the utter failure of the Spanish war machine everywhere, all the hopes which Choiseul [French Foreign Minister] had placed on the Spanish alliance vanished. 'Had I known', he wrote, 'what I now know, I should have been very careful to cause to enter the war a power which by its feebleness can only ruin and destroy France'.

— In Competition for Empire, 1740–1763

In South America, the war ended in a draw; the Portuguese took territory from Spain (most of the Rio Negro Valley) and defeated a Spanish invasion of Mato Grosso, while Spain conquered Colónia do Sacramento and the vast territory of Rio Grande do Sul (1763). The Treaty of Paris (1763) restored the status quo ante bellum. The rich and huge territory of Rio Grande do Sul would be retaken from the Spanish army during the undeclared war of 1763–1777.

=== Marquis of Pombal ===
The powerful Marquis of Pombal sought to overhaul all aspects of economic, social and colonial policy to make Portugal a more efficient contender with the other great powers of Europe, and thus enhance his own political stature. A supposed conspiracy of nobles aimed at murdering King Joseph and Pombal gave him the opportunity (some say the pretext) to neutralize the Távora family in the Távora affair and to expel the Jesuits in September 1759, thus gaining control of public education and a wealth of church lands and ushering Portugal into the Age of the Enlightenment.

== Legacy and death ==
Joseph's reign is also noteworthy for the Lisbon earthquake, firestorm and tsunami of 1 November 1755, in which between 30,000 and 40,000 people died. The earthquake caused Joseph to develop a severe case of claustrophobia, and he was never again comfortable living within a walled building. Consequently, he moved the royal court to an extensive complex of tents in the hills of Ajuda.

The Project for the Royal Palace in Campo de Ourique was an ambitious palatial complex planned for the Campo de Ourique neighborhood of Lisbon, but later abandoned due to a lack of impetus from the Portuguese royal family and a prioritization of other reconstruction efforts. The capital was eventually rebuilt at great cost, and an equestrian statue of King Joseph still dominates the Praça do Comércio, Lisbon's main plaza.

Joseph I monument in Lisbon

With Joseph's death on 24 February 1777, the throne passed to his daughter, Queen Dona Maria I, and his brother and son-in-law, King Peter III. Pombal's iron rule was sharply brought to an end, because Maria disliked him since she had been heavily influenced by the Portuguese old nobility that strongly opposed Pombal.

== Issue ==
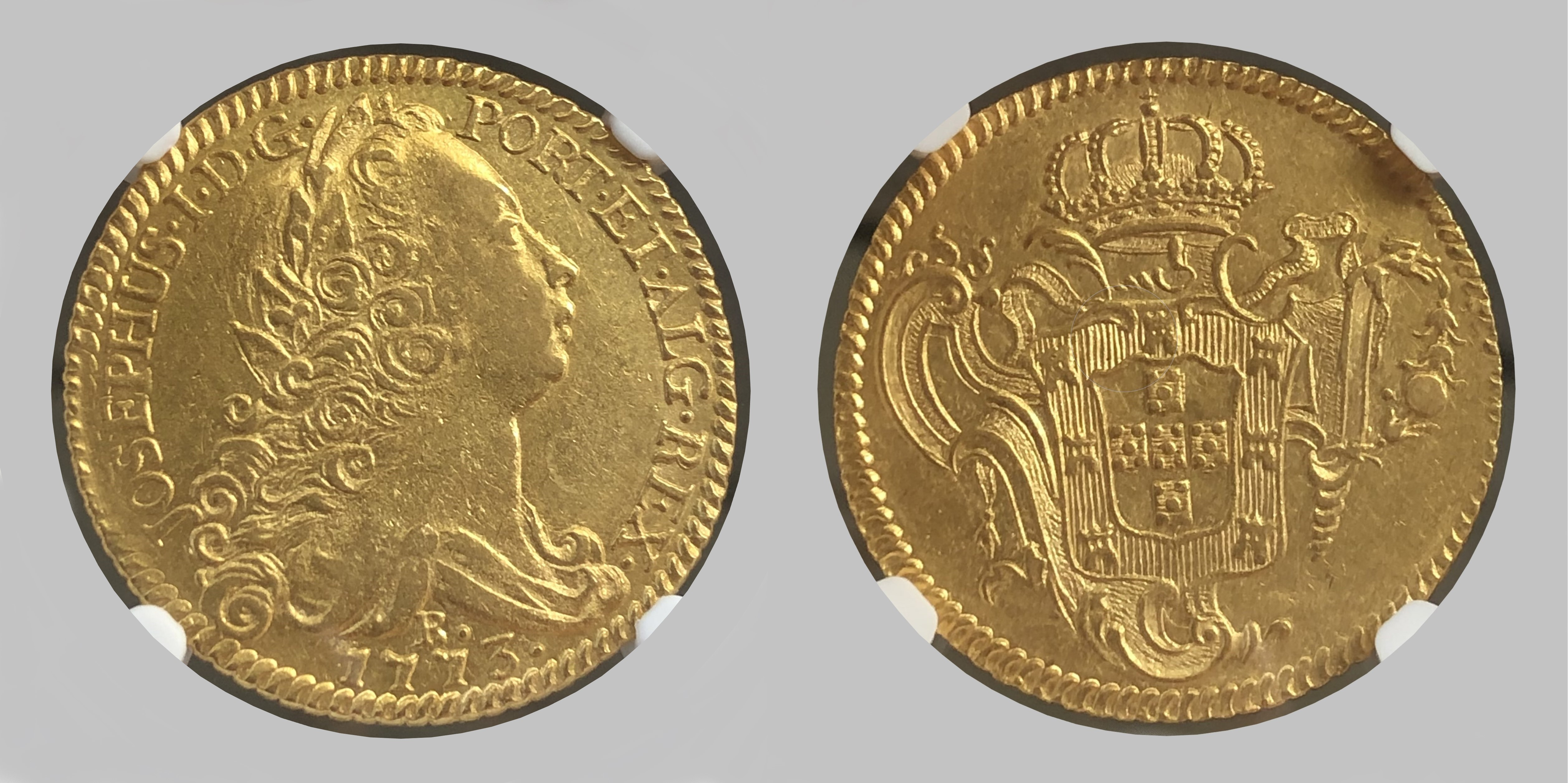
1773 State of Brazil Joseph I 6400 réis.

Joseph I fathered four daughters by his wife Mariana Victoria, and there were also four stillbirths. Of their four daughters, only the eldest had issue:

1. Maria Francisca Isabel Rita Gertrudes Joanna (17 December 1734 – 20 March 1816), married her uncle Infante Peter of Portugal, with issue. After her father's death, she became the first queen regnant of Portugal as Dona Maria I.
2. Maria Ana Francisca Dorotea Josefa Antonia Gertrudes Rita Joanna Efigenia (7 October 1736 – 6 May 1813), potential bride for Louis, Dauphin of France, son and heir of King Louis XV. However, Maria Ana's mother refused to consent to the marriage, and the infanta died unmarried.
3. Stillborn son (February 1739).
4. Maria Francisca Doroteia Josefa Antónia Gertrudes Rita Joanna Efigénia de Braganca (21 September 1739 – 14 January 1771), potential bride for the French nobleman and revolutionary Philippe Égalité, but she refused to marry him and died unmarried.
5. Stillborn daughter (7 March 1742).
6. Stillborn daughter (15 October 1742).
7. Stillborn daughter (May 1744).
8. Maria Francisca Benedita Ana Isabel Joanna Antonia Laurencia Inacia Teresa Gertrudes Rita Rosa (25 July 1746 – 18 August 1829) married her nephew Dom Joseph, Prince of Brazil, no issue.

== Ancestors ==
Ancestors of Joseph I of Portugal

8. John IV of Portugal
4. Peter II of Portugal
9. Luisa de Guzmán
2. John V of Portugal
10. Philip William, Elector Palatine
5. Maria Sophia of Neuburg
11. Elisabeth Amalie of Hesse-Darmstadt
1. Joseph I of Portugal
12. Ferdinand III, Holy Roman Emperor
6. Leopold I, Holy Roman Emperor
13. Maria Anna of Austria
3. Maria Anna of Austria
14. Philip William, Elector Palatine (= 10)
7. Eleonore Magdalene of Neuburg
15. Elisabeth Amalie of Hesse-Darmstadt (= 11)

== Sources ==
- Livermore, H.V. (1969). A New History of Portugal. Cambridge University Press. ISBN 9780521095716.
- Livermore, H.V. (1947). A History of Portugal. Cambridge University Press.
- McMurdo, Edward (1889). The history of Portugal, from the Commencement of the Monarchy to the Reign of Alfonso III. London: Sampson Low, Marston, Searle, & Rivington.
- Stephens, H. Morse (1891). The Story of Portugal. New York: G. P. Putnam's Sons.

Joseph I of Portugal House of Braganza Cadet branch of the House of Aviz Born: June 16 1714 Died: February 24 1777
Regnal titles
Preceded by John V	King of Portugal; 1750–1777	Succeeded by Maria I and Peter III
Portuguese royalty
Preceded by John	Prince of Brazil; Duke of Braganza; 1714–1750	Succeeded by Maria
