= Maria I of Portugal =

Queen of Portugal from 1777 to 1816

Maria I
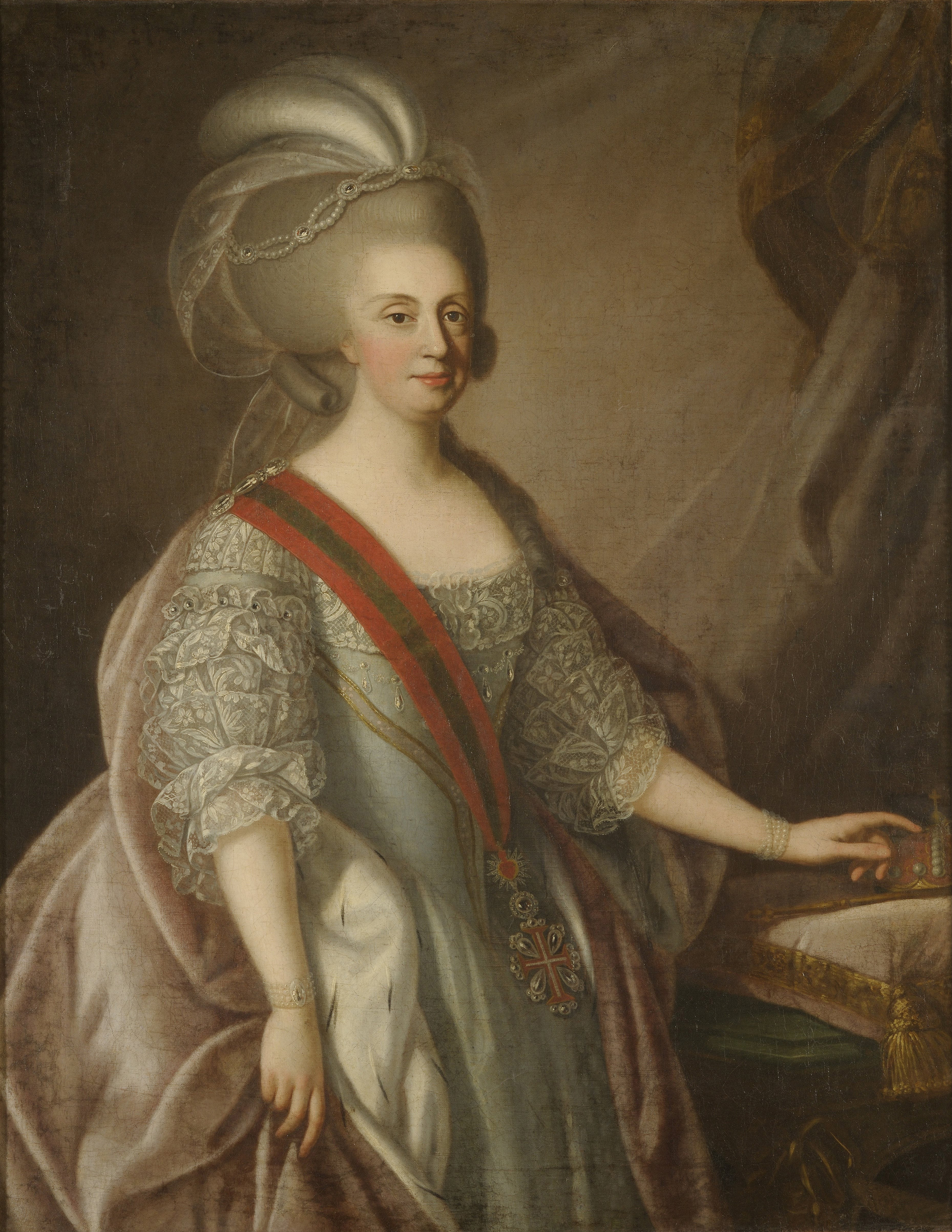
- Portrait, 1783

Queen of Portugal
- Reign: 24 February 1777 – 20 March 1816
- Acclamation: 13 May 1777
- Predecessor: Joseph I
- Successor: John VI
- Co-monarch: Peter III (1777–1786)
- Prince regent: John, Prince of Brazil (1792–1816)

Queen of Brazil
- Reign: 16 December 1815 – 20 March 1816
- Successor: John VI
- Prince regent: John, Prince of Brazil
- Born: 17 December 1734; Ribeira Palace, Lisbon, Portugal
- Died: 20 March 1816 (aged 81); Convent of Carmo, Rio de Janeiro, Brazil
- Burial: 23 March 1816 Convent of Our Lady of Ajuda, Rio de Janeiro, Brazil; 18 March 1822 Estrela Basilica, Lisbon, Portugal
- Spouse: Peter III of Portugal (m. 1760; died 1786)
- Issue Detail: Joseph, Prince of Brazil; John VI of Portugal; Mariana Victoria, Infanta Gabriel of Spain
Names
- Portuguese: Maria Francisca Isabel Josefa Antónia Gertrudes Rita Joana
- House: Braganza
- Father: Joseph I of Portugal
- Mother: Mariana Victoria of Spain

Dona Maria I (Maria Francisca Isabel Josefa Antónia Gertrudes Rita Joana; 17 December 1734 – 20 March 1816), also known as Maria the Pious in Portugal and Maria the Mad in Brazil, was Queen of Portugal from 24 February 1777 until her death in 1816. Maria was the first undisputed queen regnant of Portugal (Note: Portugal had two undisputed queens regnant: Maria I and Maria II and two disputed queens regnant: Beatriz and Teresa.) and the first monarch of Brazil.

Maria was the eldest daughter of King Joseph I of Portugal and Queen Mariana Victoria. As the heir to the throne, she held the titles of Princess of Brazil and Duchess of Braganza. She married her uncle Infante Peter in 1760. They had six children, of whom three survived infancy: José, John, and Mariana Vitória. The death of King Joseph in 1777 placed Maria, then 42 years old, on the throne. Her husband Peter was nominally king alongside her as Peter III.

Upon ascending the throne, Maria dismissed her father's powerful chief minister, Sebastião José de Carvalho e Melo, 1st Marquis of Pombal. The early part of Maria's reign witnessed growth in Portugal's economy. Maria had a number of national buildings constructed and renovated, leading to the completion of the Palace of Queluz and the inauguration of the Palace of Ajuda and other new monuments. The death of her husband in 1786, followed by the deaths in 1788 of her eldest son, José, and her confessor Inácio de São Caetano, caused the queen to develop clinical depression. Her second son, John, then served as prince regent. With Napoleon's European conquests, Maria and her court moved to the Portuguese colony of Brazil in 1807. After Brazil was elevated to a kingdom in 1815, Maria became Queen of the United Kingdom of Portugal, Brazil and the Algarves. Upon her death in 1816, she was succeeded by her son Dom John VI.

== Early life ==
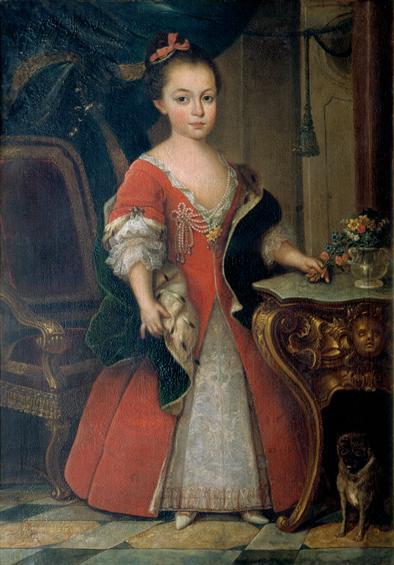
D. Maria Francisca, Princess of Beira, Duchess of Barcelos; Pavona; 1739.

Maria was born on 17 December 1734 at the Ribeira Palace in Lisbon, the eldest of four daughters of Dom Joseph, Prince of Brazil, and Infanta Mariana Victoria of Spain. Her father was the eldest surviving son of King John V of Portugal, while her mother was the eldest daughter of King Philip V of Spain. Maria was baptized Maria Francisca Isabel Josefa Antónia Gertrudes Rita Joana and received the title Princess of Beira.

Maria was educated alongside her sisters at the royal court. Under the instruction of Jesuit tutors, her education focused primarily on religion and theology rather than affairs of state, although she became proficient in French and Latin. The sisters also received instruction in painting from Domingos Sequeira and in singing and instrumental music from David Perez.

Maria's grandfather died on 31 July 1750. Her father, Prince Joseph, then succeeded to the throne as Joseph I. As Joseph's eldest child, Maria became his heir presumptive and was given the traditional titles of Princess of Brazil and Duchess of Braganza. On 10 August 1750, Maria made her first official appearance as crown princess during a traditional hand-kissing ceremony.

In June 1753, Maria fell gravely ill and was bled six times. At her mother's request, a wooden statue of Jesus known as Senhor dos Passos was placed in her bedroom. Maria recovered by 8 July and thereafter attributed her survival to Senhor dos Passos, strengthening her religious convictions.

=== Influence of the Marquis of Pombal ===
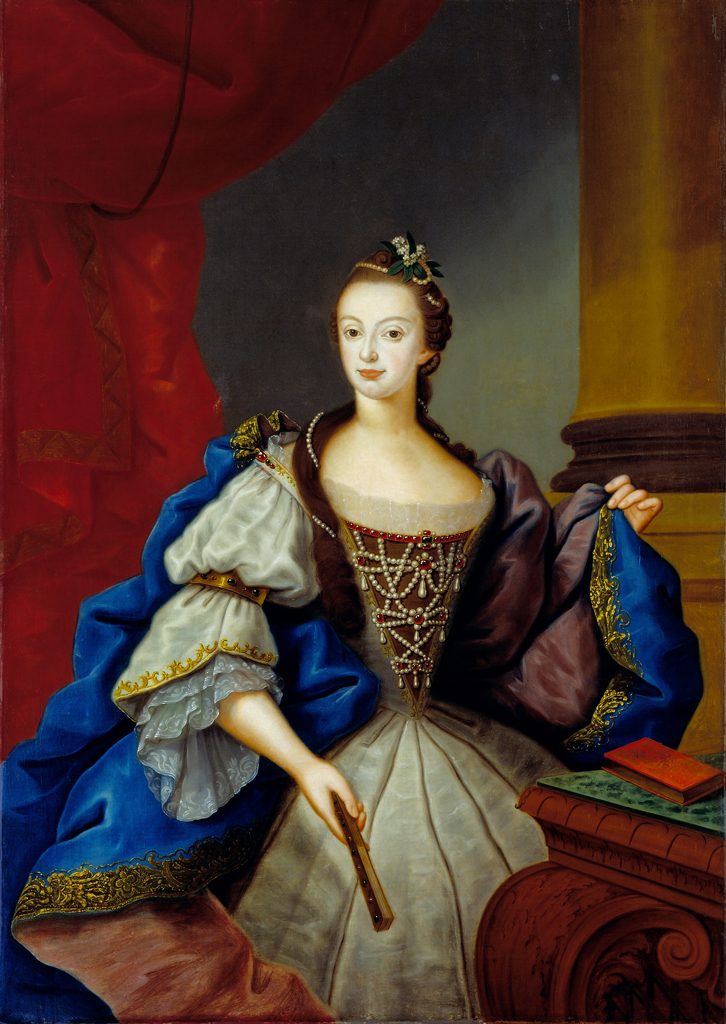
Maria Francisca Isabel, Princess of Brazil. Portrait by Vieira Lusitano, 1753

Maria's father was ill-prepared for kingship and showed little interest in government, preferring opera and hunting. He soon came under the dominant influence of Sebastião José de Carvalho e Melo, 1st Marquis of Pombal.

The 1755 Lisbon earthquake devastated the capital and killed thousands. The Ribeira Palace was destroyed, and Maria and her family lived in tents at Belém for several months. Uneasy about living in stone buildings after the disaster, King Joseph declined to move the royal family to Belém Palace and instead ordered the construction of a wooden residence at Ajuda. The residence became known as the Real Barraca de Ajuda (Royal Hut at Ajuda).

Pombal's effective response to the earthquake further consolidated his power. After the Jesuits criticized his policies and spread the claim that the earthquake was divine retribution, Pombal grew suspicious of conspiracies and ordered all Jesuit confessors to be dismissed from the Real Barraca, including Maria's respected confessor, Timóteo de Oliveira.

On 3 September 1758, King Joseph was wounded in an attempted assassination. Pombal used the attack to prosecute members of the high nobility, including the Távora family and the Duke of Aveiro, who were accused of involvement in the conspiracy. Many of the accused were tortured into confessing before several nobles, including the Duke of Aveiro, were brutally executed in January 1759. Maria knew several of the accused aristocrats and allegedly pleaded with her father on their behalf. In 1761, the Jesuit priest Gabriel Malagrida was convicted of heresy and executed. Maria was deeply disturbed by the executions and by Pombal's wider persecution of Jesuits.

=== Marriage ===
By her 25th birthday, Maria remained unmarried, which was unusual for a princess of her time. As the Laws of Lamego barred her from inheriting the throne if she married a foreign prince, a marriage to her paternal uncle Peter had been proposed as early as 1749. The marriage was initially met with opposition but gradually gained support because Peter was considered politically unambitious.

Maria and Peter married in a private ceremony on 6 June 1760. Peter was 18 years her senior, but the couple shared a strong religious devotion. Maria was pleased with the marriage. The couple had six children, three of whom survived to adulthood: José, John, and Mariana Victoria. Maria also had two late miscarriages.

Fearing that Maria would reverse his secularizing policies, Pombal sought to bypass her in the succession and have the liberally educated Prince José succeed Joseph I. José de Seabra da Silva, Pombal's second-in-command, disclosed the plan to Queen Mariana in January 1774, who informed Maria. Believing that she had been spared by God to inherit the throne and restore the influence of the Church, Maria appealed to her father, who abandoned the proposal. Seabra da Silva was subsequently dismissed by Pombal.

== Reign ==
Portrait by Miguel António do Amaral of Queen Dona Maria I and King Peter III, c. 1777–1780

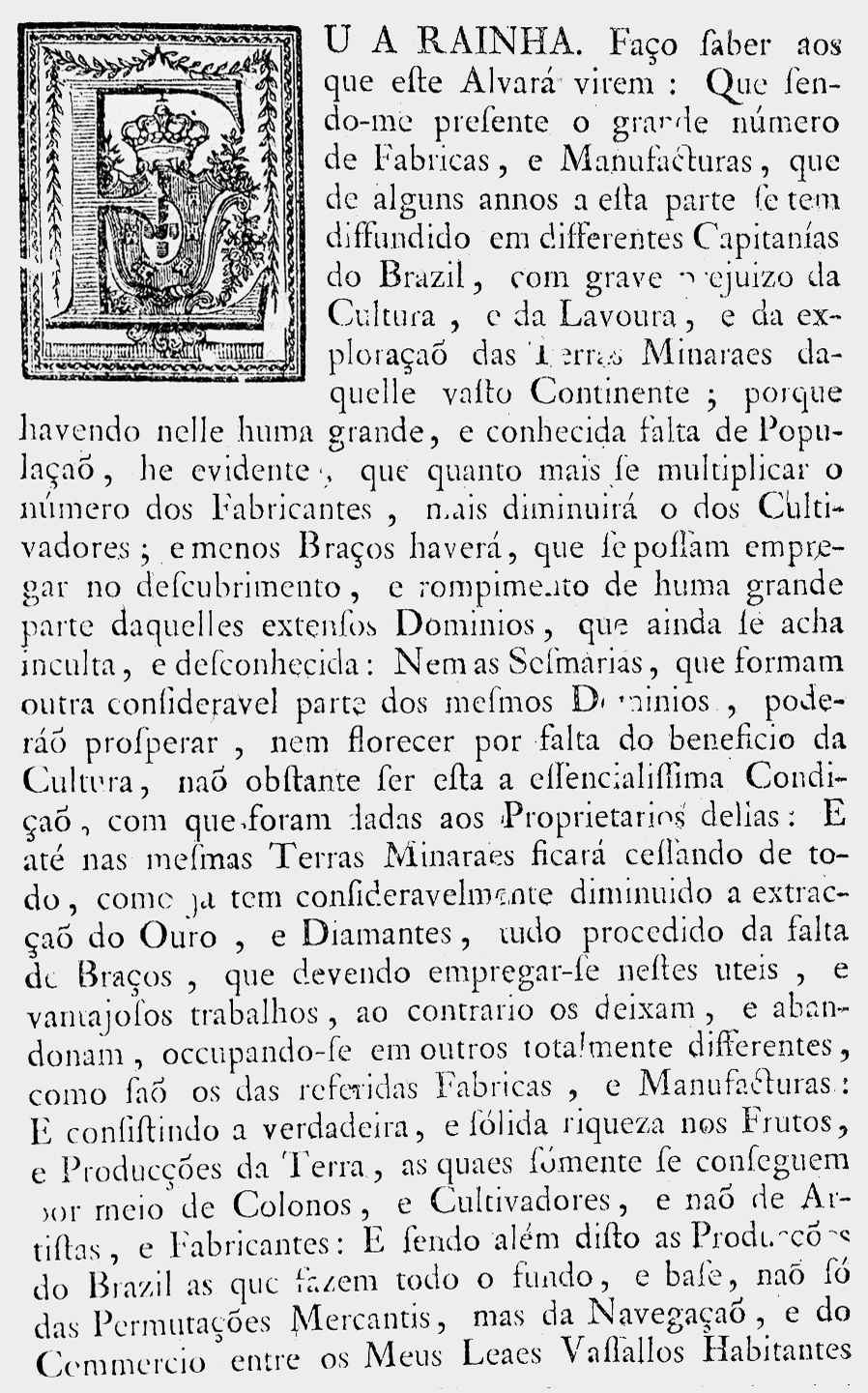
Part of the Charter of Queen Maria, which prohibited factories and manufactures in Brazil in 1785.

After years of ill health, King Joseph died on 24 February 1777. Maria, aged 42, succeeded him as the first undisputed queen regnant of Portugal. On 28 February, Maria pardoned more than eight hundred prisoners. She moved swiftly to dismantle the influence of the Marquis of Pombal, ordering him not to return to the palace before formally dismissing him in early March. After recovering from a bout of measles that had delayed the formalities of her accession, Maria met with her ministers on 27 April. They confirmed that her husband would reign nominally as King Peter III, while sovereign authority remained vested solely in Maria as the crown's lineal heir. (Note: As Peter's kingship was jure uxoris only, his reign would cease in the event of Maria's death, and the crown would pass to Maria's descendants. However, Peter predeceased his wife in 1786.) Maria was formally acclaimed on 13 May in the Praça do Comércio.

Maria's accession marked the beginning of the Viradeira ("turnabout"), a period characterized by the partial reversal of the policies pursued under the Marquis of Pombal. Maria's first cabinet included both former Pombaline ministers and moderate opponents of the marquis, preserving much of the administrative system established during the previous reign. An inquiry into Pombal's administration later found him guilty of abuses of power, but Maria pardoned him because of his age and ill health. She was also reluctant to impose a harsher sentence because it would have reflected adversely on the legacy of her father, under whose authority Pombal had exercised power. A separate investigation exonerated the Távora family, though their confiscated estates and titles were not restored. While signing the edict confirming their pardon on 9 October 1780, Maria suffered her first major mental breakdown.

Maria is considered to have been a good ruler in the period prior to her madness. Noteworthy events of this period include Portugal's membership in the League of Armed Neutrality (July 1782) and the 1781 cession of Delagoa Bay from Austria to Portugal. However, the queen suffering from melancholia and declining mental health (perhaps due to porphyria) made her incapable of handling state affairs after 1792.

On 5 January 1785 the queen issued a charter imposing heavy restrictions on industrial activity in Brazil; how, for example, it prohibited the manufacture of fabrics and other products, extinguishing all textile manufactures in the colony, except the industry of coarse cloth for the use of slaves and workers; since the Portuguese colonial administration did not look favorably on the development of industrial activities in Brazil for fear of economic and, perhaps, political independence. During her reign, the trial, conviction and execution of ensign Joaquim José da Silva Xavier, known as Tiradentes, took place in 1789.

== Mental deterioration ==
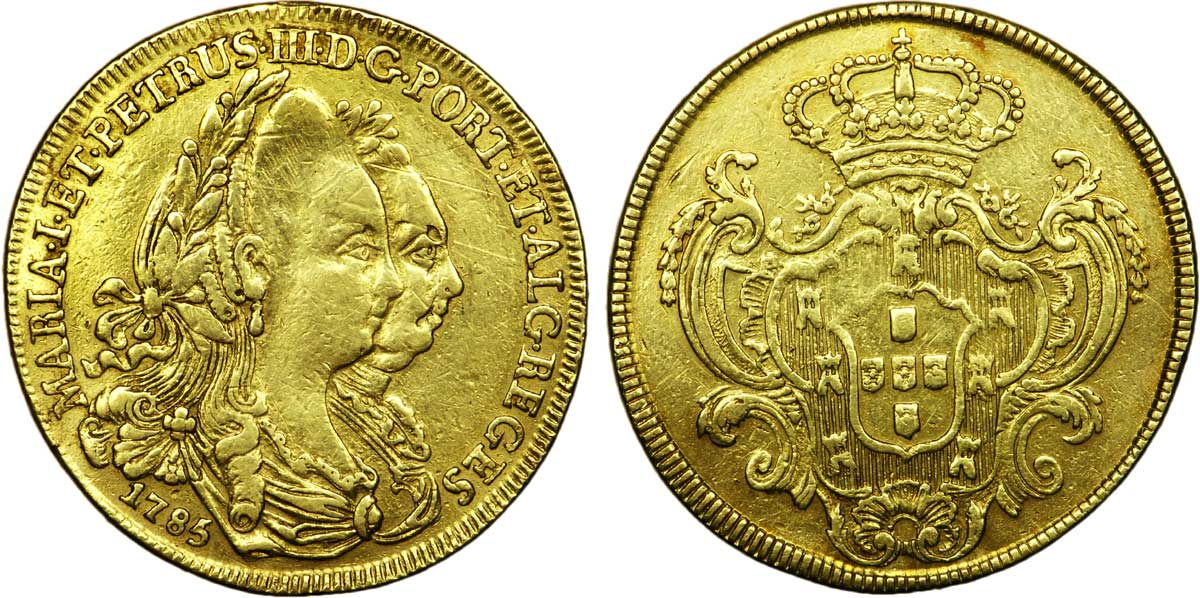
4 escudos coin with effigy of Maria I and Peter III, 1785

Maria's madness was first officially noticed in 1786, when she had to be carried back to her apartments in a state of delirium. Afterwards, the queen's mental state became progressively worse. On 25 May 1786, her husband died; Maria was devastated and forbade any court entertainments. According to a contemporary account, state festivities began to resemble religious ceremonies. The queen's eldest son and heir, Prince Dom José, died aged 27 from smallpox on 11 September 1788, and that same year, on November 2, her daughter Mariana Vitória died a few days after giving birth to her third child from the same illness as her brother at just 19. The queen's confessor, Inácio de São Caetano, Titular Archbishop of Salonica, died almost four weeks later. These deaths may have resulted in Queen Maria developing major depressive disorder. Another potential cause was her incestuous ancestry; this is substantiated by two of her sisters having had similar conditions.

In February 1792, Maria was deemed insane and was treated by Francis Willis, the same physician who attended the British king George III. Willis wanted to take her to England, but the plan was refused by the Portuguese court. Potentially as a result of Willis' more advisory role in Maria's care, rather than the hands-on care of King George III, Willis deemed the queen incurable. Maria's second son, John, now Prince of Brazil, took over the government in her name, even though he only took the title of Prince Regent in 1799. When the Real Barraca de Ajuda burnt down in 1794, the court was forced to move to Queluz, where the ill queen would lie in her apartments all day. Visitors would complain of terrible screams that would echo throughout the palace.

== Napoleonic Wars ==
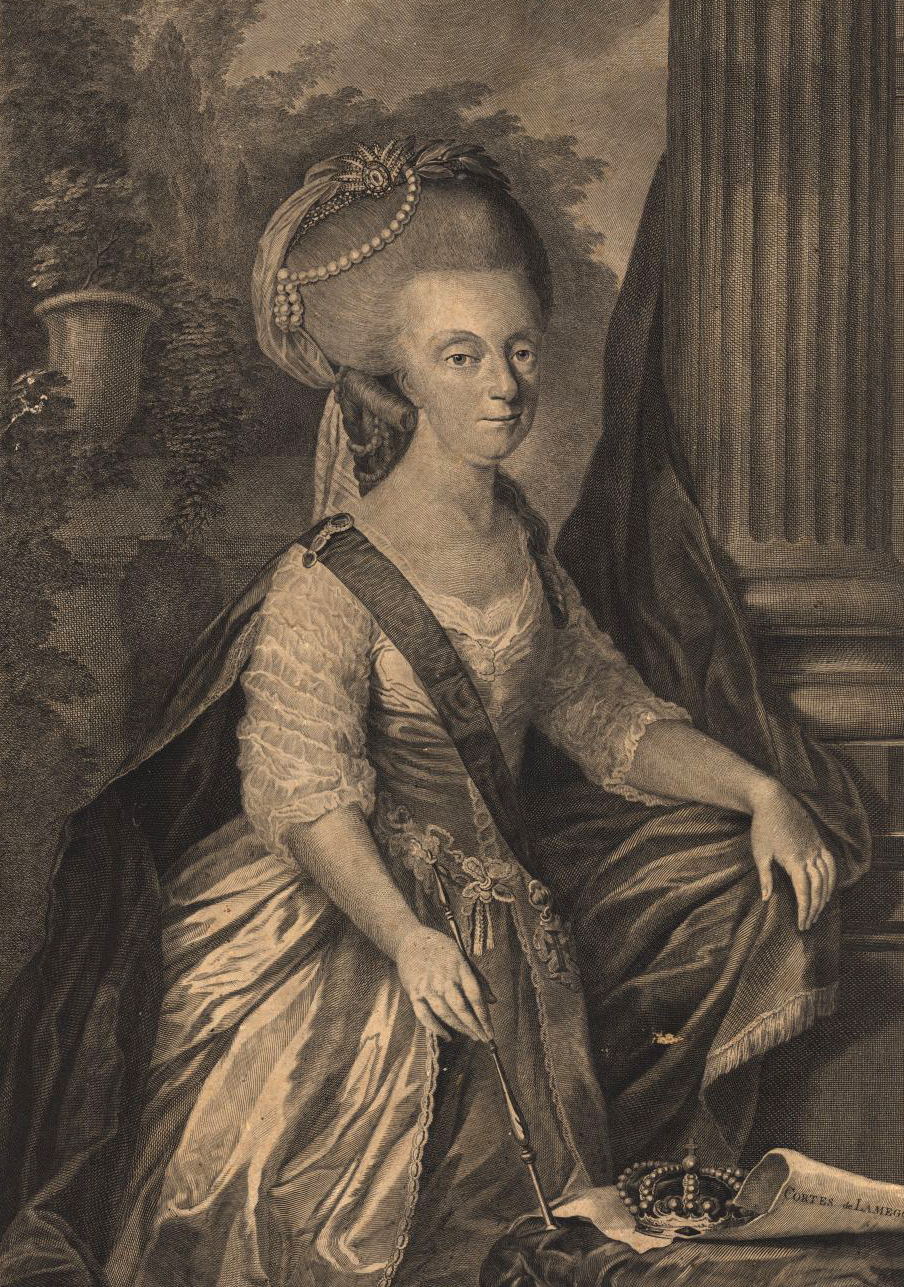
Engraving of Maria I from 1786

In 1801, Spanish Prime Minister Manuel de Godoy sent an army to invade Portugal with backing from the French leader Napoleon, resulting in the War of the Oranges. Though the Spanish ended their invasion, the Treaty of Badajoz on 6 June 1801 forced Portugal to cede Olivença and other border towns to Spain. (This cession is not recognized by the present Portuguese government, and the country officially considers those territories still to be Portuguese possessions.) On 29 September, Prince John signed the Treaty of Madrid (1801), ceding half of Portuguese Guyana to France, which became French Guiana.

The refusal of the Portuguese government to join the French-sponsored Continental Blockade against Britain culminated in the late 1807 Franco-Spanish invasion of Portugal led by General Jean-Andoche Junot. The ultimate Napoleonic plan for Portugal was to split it into three sections. The northern parts of Portugal, from the Douro to the Minho, would become the Kingdom of Northern Lusitania, and its throne was promised to King Louis II of Etruria. The Alentejo Province and Kingdom of the Algarve would be merged to form the Principality of the Algarves, of which Manuel de Godoy would be sovereign. The remaining portion of Portugal would have been directly ruled by France.

=== Transfer to Brazil ===
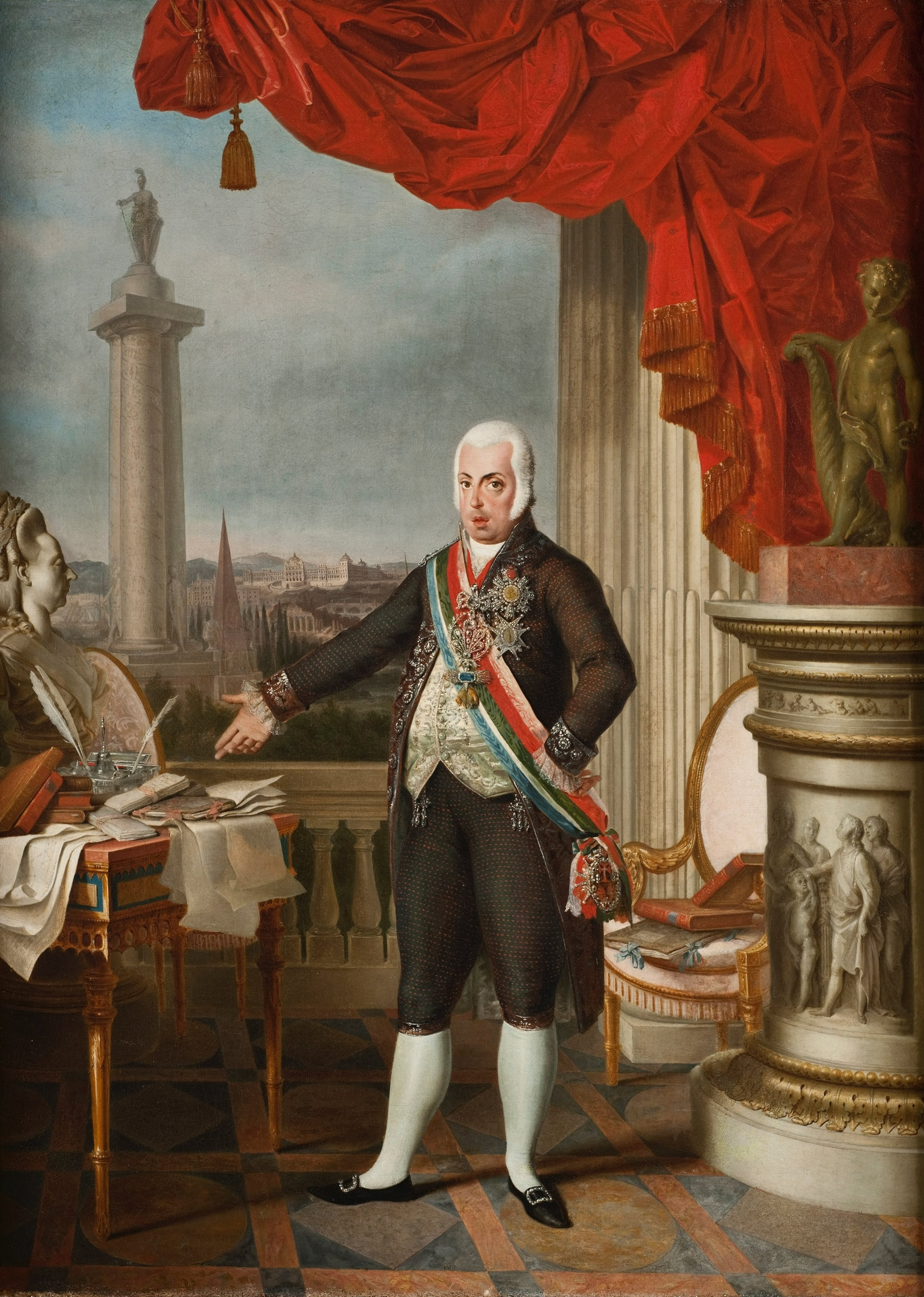
Maria's second son, Prince Regent John, with a bust of his mother

At the urging of the British government, the entire House of Braganza decided to flee on 29 November 1807 to establish a government in exile in the Portuguese Viceroyalty of Brazil. Along with the royal family, Maria was transported aboard the carrack Príncipe Real. During her move from the royal palace to the docks, she was heard screaming throughout the trip in the middle of the crowd and in the carriage. The queen's dementia was so great that she feared that she was going to be tortured or robbed during her movement by her servants.

In January 1808, Prince Regent John and his court arrived in Salvador da Bahia. Under pressure by local aristocracy and the British, the prince regent signed a commercial regulation after his arrival that opened commerce between Brazil and friendly nations, which in this case represented the interests of Great Britain above all. This law broke an important colonial pact that had previously allowed Brazil to maintain direct commercial relations only with Portugal.

On 1 August, British General Arthur Wellesley (later the Duke of Wellington) landed a British army in Lisbon to initiate the Peninsular War. The impact of Wellesley's initial victory over Junot at the Battle of Vimeiro (21 August 1808) was wiped out by his superiors in the Convention of Cintra (30 August 1808), which allowed the defeated French troops to evacuate peacefully from Portugal.

Wellesley returned to Portugal on 22 April 1809 to recommence the campaign. Portuguese forces under British command distinguished themselves in the defence of the Lines of Torres Vedras (1809–1810) and in the subsequent invasion of Spain and France. In 1815, Prince John's government elevated Brazil to the status of a kingdom, and Maria was proclaimed Queen of the United Kingdom of Portugal, Brazil and the Algarves. When Napoleon was finally defeated in 1815, Maria and her family remained in Brazil.

== Death and legacy ==
Tomb of Maria I at Estrela Basilica in Lisbon, Portugal

Maria lived in Brazil for a total of eight years, always in a state of incapacitation. On 20 March 1816, she died at the Carmo Convent in Rio de Janeiro at the age of 81. After her death, the prince regent was acclaimed as King John VI. In 1821, Maria's body was returned to Lisbon to be interred in a mausoleum in the Estrela Basilica (Portuguese: Basílica da Estrela), which she had helped found.

Maria is a greatly admired figure in both Brazil and Portugal due to the tremendous changes and events that took place during her reign. In Portugal, she is celebrated as a strong female figure. Her legacy shines at Portugal's Queluz Palace, a baroque-roccoco masterpiece that she helped conceive. A large statue of her stands in front of the palace, and a pousada near the palace is named in her honour. A large marble statue of the queen was erected at the Portuguese National Library in Lisbon by the students of Joaquim Machado de Castro.

In Brazil, Maria is admired as a key figure in the eventual independence of Brazil. It was during her reign, albeit through the government of her son's regency, that many of the national institutions and organizations in Brazil were created. These institutions were the precursors to their modern-day equivalents and granted large degree of power to the Brazilian colonials. While she is often called A Louca (the Mad) in Brazil, Brazilian and Portuguese historians hold her in high esteem.

== Marriage and issue ==
Maria married her uncle Peter on 6 June 1760. At the time of their marriage, Maria was 25 and Peter was 42. Despite the age gap, the couple had a happy marriage. Upon Maria's accession in 1777, her husband became the nominal King Peter III of Portugal. They had six children:

Name	Birth	Death	Notes
Joseph, Prince of Brazil	20 August 1761	11 September 1788	José Francisco Xavier de Paula Domingos António Agostinho Anastácio married his maternal aunt Infanta Benedita of Portugal and had no issue. His death led to his younger brother becoming heir apparent and later king.
John Francis of Braganza	16 September 1763	10 October 1763	João Francisco de Paula Domingos António Carlos Cipriano was born at the Ajuda National Palace.
John VI	13 May 1767	10 March 1826	João Maria José Francisco Xavier de Paula Luís António Domingos Rafael married Carlota Joaquina, eldest daughter of King Don Carlos IV (Charles IV) of Spain, and had issue. He was King of Portugal from 1816 to 1826 as John VI and titular Emperor of Brazil from 1825 to 1826.
Infanta Mariana Victoria of Portugal	15 December 1768	2 November 1788	Mariana Vitória Josefa Francisca Xavier de Paula Antonieta Joana Domingas Gabriela married Infante Gabriel of Spain, son of King Don Carlos III, and had issue.
Maria Clementina of Braganza	9 June 1774	27 June 1776	Maria Clementina Francisca Xavier de Paula Ana Josefa Antónia Domingas Feliciana Joana Michaela Júlia was born at the Queluz National Palace.
Maria Isabella of Braganza	22 December 1776	14 January 1777	Maria Isabel was born at the Queluz National Palace.

== Ancestry ==
Ancestors of Maria I of Portugal

8. Peter II of Portugal
4. John V of Portugal
9. Maria Sophia of Neuburg
2. Joseph I of Portugal
10. Leopold I, Holy Roman Emperor
5. Maria Anna of Austria
11. Eleonore Magdalene of Neuburg
1. Maria I of Portugal
12. Louis, Dauphin of France
6. Philip V of Spain
13. Maria Anna Victoria of Bavaria
3. Mariana Victoria of Spain
14. Odoardo Farnese, Hereditary Prince of Parma
7. Elisabeth Farnese
15. Dorothea Sophie of Neuburg

== See also ==
- List of mentally ill monarchs

== Bibliography ==
- Benevides, Francisco da Fonseca. Rainhas de Portugal: Estudo Historico - Volume I. Lisbon, Portugal: Typographia Castro Irmão.
- Benevides, Francisco da Fonseca. Rainhas de Portugal: Estudo Historico - Volume II. Lisbon, Portugal: Typographia Castro Irmão.
- Birmingham, David (2018). A Concise History of Portugal (3rd ed.). Cambridge University Press.
- Cheke, Marcus (1947). Carlota Joaquina, Queen of Portugal. London, England: Sidgewick & Jackson. p. 203. ISBN 9780836950403.
- Disney, A. R. (2009). A History of Portugal and the Portuguese Empire. From Beginnings to 1807. Vol. I: Portugal. Cambridge University Press. ISBN 978-0-521-60397-3.
- Fernandes, Maria de Fátima da Paz (2017). O Palácio de Runa: História, Arte e Programa de Musealização [Palace of Runa: History, Art and Museum Program] (PDF) (Thesis) (in Portuguese). University of Lisbon.
- Gomes, Laurentino (2007). 1808 — How a mad queen, a coward prince and a corrupt court fooled Napoleon and changed the History of Portugal and Brazil (in Portuguese). Planeta.
- Livermore, H.V. (1947). A History of Portugal. Cambridge University Press.
- Roberts, Jenifer (2009). The Madness of Queen Maria: The Remarkable Life of Maria I of Portugal. Templeton Press.
- Saraiva, José Hermano (2007). História Concisa de Portugal [Concise History of Portugal] (in Portuguese) (24th ed.). Lisbon, Portugal: Colecção Saber.
- Souza Abenassiff, Ana Lucia (2018). Trajetória política de D. Maria I: ideias ilustradas, convulsão política e melancolia (Thesis) (in Portuguese). Federal University of Espírito Santo.

Maria I of Portugal House of Braganza Cadet branch of the House of Aviz Born: 17 December 1734 Died: 20 March 1816
Regnal titles
Preceded by Joseph I	Queen of Portugal; 1777–1816 with Peter III (1777–1786)	Succeeded by John VI
Portuguese royalty
Preceded by Maria Barbara	Princess of Beira; Duchess of Barcelos; 1734–1750	Succeeded by Joseph
Preceded by Joseph	Princess of Brazil; Duchess of Braganza; 1750–1777	Succeeded by Joseph
