= Armahda =

Brazilian heavy metal band

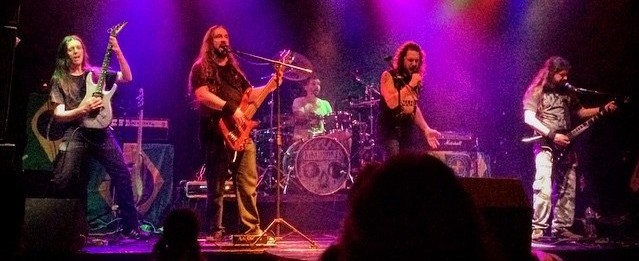
- The band live in 2015. From left to right: Alexandre Dantas, Paulo Chopps, João Pires, Maurício Guimarães and Renato Domingos.

Background information
- Origin: São Paulo, São Paulo, Brazil
- Genres: Heavy metal, thrash metal, power metal
- Years active: 2011–present
- Labels: Independent
- Members: Maurício Guimarães; Alexandre Dantas; Renato Domingos; Paulo Chopps; João Pires

Armahda is a Brazilian heavy metal band formed in 2011. They are known for dealing with themes related to the History of Brazil in their lyrics. With bands Aclla, Arandu Arakuaa, Cangaço, Hate Embrace, MorrigaM, Tamuya Thrash Tribe and Voodoopriest, they form the Levante do Metal Nativo (Native Metal Uprising), a movement gathering bands that mix heavy metal with typical musical elements from that country and/or write lyrics about it. The group cites Blind Guardian, Sabaton, Black Sabbath, classical 1970s bands and German power metal bands as influences.

== History ==
The band was conceived by vocalist Maurício Guimarães and guitarist Renato Domingos, who met in the early 2000s. To write the lyrics, the group performs bibliographical researches to make sure the information is correct, including consulting the works at Biblioteca Nacional, Biblioteca do Exército and books by Laurentino Gomes. They also try not to make the lyrics too political in order not to be labelled as monarchists or admired by radical nationalists. The other three members were initially just session musicians.

They released their first, self-titled, album in December 2013, with tracks about Maria I of Portugal, Guaraní War, Fernão Dias' expeditions and legends Matinta Perera and Iara. All tracks are sung in English except for "Paiol em Chamas", about explosions in weapons depots of the Brazilian Army in 1958, an event involving a military who was Guimarães' grandfather. The title track also contains part of its lyrics in Portuguese and talks about the Revolta da Armada, which names the quintet. In this song, voice actor Sílvio Navas, famous for his work in ThunderCats's Mumm-Ra, lend his voice to the parts spoken by marshall Floriano Peixoto.

In 2014, they opened a show by Swedish band Sabaton, also notorious for its historical lyrics. Still in 2014, they said in an interview that they would like to talk about topics such as Zumbi dos Palmares and José de Anchieta in a future sophomore album, besides revisiting the War of Canudos, already covered in Armahda. They also intend to write more songs in Portuguese and with more Brazilian elements.

In 2015, the band released a new single, "The Last Farewell", which lyrics deal with Dom Pedro II's final reigning days before the Proclamation of the Republic of Brazil. In order to write the lyrics, the band consulted material given by the Brazilian Imperial Family.
