= Ipiranga Brook =

River in São Paulo State, Brazil

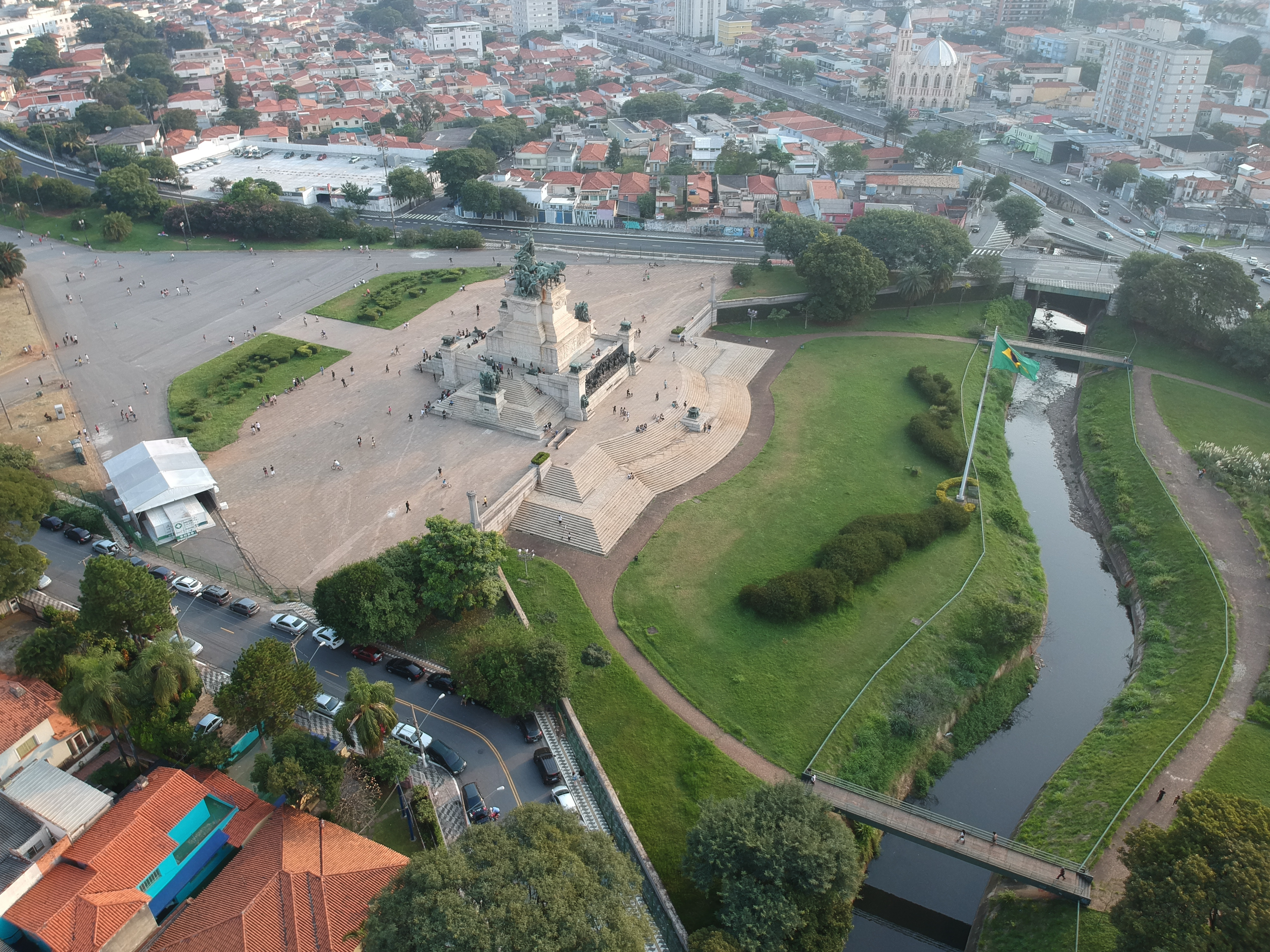
- Ipiranga Brook with the Monument to the Independence of Brazil
- Native name: Riacho do Ipiranga (Portuguese)

Location
- Country: Brazil
- Region: São Paulo city, São Paulo state

Physical characteristics
- Source
  - location: São Paulo Botanical Garden, São Paulo city
- Mouth: Tamanduateí River
  - location: São Paulo city
  - coordinates: 23°34′S 46°37′W
- Length: 9 km (5.6 mi)

The Ipiranga Brook (in Portuguese: Riacho do Ipiranga, Portuguese pronunciation: [ˈʁiaʃu du ipiˈɾɐ̃gɐ]), is a river of São Paulo state in southeastern Brazil, historically known as the place where Dom Pedro I declared the independence of Brazil from the United Kingdom of Portugal, Brazil and the Algarves.

Its name derives from the Tupi words 'y, meaning "water" or "river", and piranga, meaning "red". It is also mentioned in the country's national anthem.

== Declaration of Independence ==
Prince Pedro declares the Independence of Brazil on September 7, 1822. "Independência ou Morte" (Independence or death) (1888), oil on canvas painting by Pedro Américo.

On September 2, 1822, a decree with Lisbon's demands arrived in Rio de Janeiro, while Prince Pedro was in São Paulo. Princess Maria Leopoldina, acting as Princess Regent, met with the Council of Ministers and decided to send her husband a letter advising him to proclaim Brazil's independence. The letter reached Prince Pedro on September 7, 1822. That same day, in a famous scene at the shore of the Ipiranga Brook, he declared the country's independence, ending 322 years of colonial dominance of Portugal over Brazil. According to journalist Laurentino Gomes, who wrote a book about the event, 1822, Prince Pedro "could not wait for his arrival to São Paulo to announce the decision"; Pedro "was a reckless man in his decisions but he had the profile of leader that Brazil needed at the time, because there was no time to think".

== See also ==
- List of rivers of São Paulo
- Independence Day (Brazil)
- 1822 (book by Laurentino Gomes)
- Independence or Death (painting)
