= Arandu Arakuaa =

Brazilian folk metal band

- Origin: Brasília, Distrito Federal, Brazil
- Genres: Folk metal, indigenous music, thrash metal
- Years active: 2008–present
- Labels: MS Metal Records
- Members: Zândhio Huku; Andressa Barbosa; Guilherme Cezario; João Mancha
- Past members: Nájila Cristina; Adriano Ferreira; Saulo Lucena; Lís Carvalho

Arandu Arakuaa is a Brazilian folk metal band formed in the country's capital, Brasília.

== History ==
Guitarist and founder Zândhio Aquino said he was born and raised near a Xerente territory, in the state of Tocantins, where he came in contact with indigenous music and Brazilian regional music such as baião, catira, cantiga de roda, and vaquejada. He cites Metallica and Black Sabbath as his influences from the metal side.

Arandu Arakuaa means "knowledge of the sky cycles" or "cosmos knowledge" in Tupi–Guarani. They began in April 2008 when Zândhio Aquino started to compose songs in Old Tupi. After a few unsuccessful attempts with some musicians, the band finally established its final lineup between October 2010 and February 2011 as members Nájila Cristina, Adriano Ferreira and Saulo Lucena became part of the group.

In August 2011, the band performed their first show, and in June 2012 released their first demo album in June 2012. Between February and April 2013, they recorded their debut album, Kó Yby Oré ('this is our land'), released later that year in September.

== Musical style ==
The band is noted for blending extreme heavy metal with Brazilian folk music, specifically indigenous tunes. Their lyrics also reflect indigenous cultures, referring to their myths and rites.

Along with bands Aclla, Armahda, Cangaço, Hate Embrace, MorrigaM, Tamuya Thrash Tribe and Voodoopriest, they form the Levante do Metal Nativo ("Native Metal Uprising"), a movement gathering bands that mix heavy metal with typical musical elements from that country and/or write lyrics about it.

== Members ==
- Zândhio Huku — guitar, viola caipira, tribal vocals, keyboards, maracá (2008–present)
- Andressa Barbosa — bass, vocals (2018–present)
- Guilherme Cezario – guitar, backing vocals (2018–present)
- João Mancha — drums, percussion (2018–present)

=== Former members ===
- Nájila Cristina — vocals, maracá (2011–2016)
- Adriano Ferreira — drums, percussion (2011–2016)
- Saulo Lucena — bass, backing vocals (2011–2018)
- Lís Carvalho — vocals (2018)

=== Touring members ===
- Karine Aguiar — vocals (2017)
- Ygor Saunier — drums, percussion (2017)
- Pablo Vilela — guitar (2017)
- Juan Bessa — guitar (2014)

== Discography ==
=== EP ===
- 2012 – Arandu Arakuaa
- 2021 – Ainãka

=== Studio albums ===
- 2013 – Kó Yby Oré
- 2015 – Wdê Nnãkrda
- 2018 – Mrã Waze

=== Singles ===
- 2020 – "Waptokwa Zawré"
- 2020 – "Kaburéûasu"
- 2020 – "Ybytu"
- 2020 – "Am’mrã"
- 2020 – "Kûarasy"

=== Videos ===
- 2013 – "Gûyrá"
- 2014 – "Aruanãs"
- 2015 – "Hêwaka Waktû"
- 2016 – "Ipredu"
- 2018 – "Huku Hêmba"
- 2018 – "Îasy"
- 2020 – "Waptokwa Zawré"
- 2020 – "Kaburéûasu"
- 2020 – "Ybytu"
- 2020 – "Am’mrã"
- 2022 – "Kûarasy"
