= List of mentally ill monarchs =

This article lists monarchs who were documented to have mental illness. Such allegations are not necessarily conclusive, since the documenters might have written from political biases or rumor.

== Roman emperors ==
- Tiberius (42 BC–37 AD, ruled 14–37 AD). While Tiberius was in his later years in Capri, rumours abounded as to what exactly he was doing there. Historian Suetonius records the rumours of lurid tales of sexual perversity, including graphic depictions of child molestation, cruelty, and especially paranoia. Suetonius' stories paint a picture of how Tiberius was perceived by the Roman senatorial class, and what his impact on the Principate was during his 23 years of rule.
- Gaius Caligula (12–41 AD, ruled 37–41). Contemporary author Philo of Alexandria recorded that he fell ill soon after becoming emperor, and his subsequent reign was marked by shocking extremes of paranoia, cruelty and megalomania. Seneca the Younger, who once fell afoul of Caligula, confirmed his erratic behavior in passing. His successor Claudius neither condemned nor defended his memory, and later historians continued to describe his madness.
- Nero (37-68 AD, ruled 54–68 AD). The historians Tacitus, Suetonius and Cassius Dio described him as a depraved and jealous tyrant who sought public acclaim in the theater and arena while ordering the deaths of rivals, even his relatives, including his mother Agrippina the Younger. Based on these histories (about which doubts exist) he has been suspected of psychotic or paranoid delusions.
- Commodus (161–192, ruled 177–192) succeeded his father Marcus Aurelius at the age of 19. He left government to different advisors during most of his reign, preferring to impress the public as a gladiator. After the overthrow of his chamberlain Cleander, he developed extreme megalomania, attempting to transform the empire into his own personality cult.
- Antoninus Elagabalus (204–222, ruled 218–222) was made emperor as a teenager by conspirators against Macrinus. He proved uncontrollable, indulging himself in sexual orgies and human sacrifice, appointing incompetent favorites to office, and defiling all religions other than his own.
- Justin II (c. 520–578, ruled 15 November 565–574). John of Ephesus, who suffered theological persecution under Justin, wrote that his "mind was agitated and darkened" such that he behaved at times like a wild animal. On the advice of his wife Sophia and the Senate, he adopted the general Tiberius II Constantine as his son and delegated state authority to him.

== European monarchs ==
- Charles VI of France (1368–1422; ruled 1380–1422), known as Charles le Fou ("Charles the Mad"), had bouts of psychosis, including glass delusion.
- Edward of Portugal (1391–1438; ruled 1433–1438) had an episode of "melancholic humour" that lasted for more than three years when he was instructed to act as regent for his father, John I, during the preparations for the conquest of Ceuta; recognising it as an illness, he left a rare first-person account of his experience of it in his advice book, The Loyal Counselor.
- Henry VI of England (1421–1471; ruled 1422–1461 and 1470–1471). A breakdown in 1453 caused him to neglect state affairs for more than a year. A Lord Protector was appointed on that and two subsequent occasions to govern the kingdom, and after his Queen, Margaret of Anjou conducted state affairs for him. Her rise to power, and the ensuing succession struggles gave rise to the Wars of the Roses.
- Joanna of Castile (1479–1555; ruled 1504–1555) succeeded to a crown hotly disputed between her father Ferdinand and her husband Philip the Handsome. Ferdinand used the claim of mental infirmity to prevent her from governing, and after years of intrigues by him, Philip and her son Charles, she was committed to the Tordesillas Palace. Historians have suggested that she had melancholia, psychosis or schizophrenia.
- Eric XIV of Sweden (1533–1577; ruled 1560–1568). Developed paranoia and irrational, violent streaks later in his life leading to an erratic rule and the brutal murders of several real or perceived political rivals in the Sture Murders. Eric himself stabbed Nils Svantesson Sture to death.
- Philip V of Spain (1683–1746; ruled 1700–24, 1724–46). Experienced intense melancholia.
- Ferdinand VI of Spain (1713–59). Like his father Philip V, had melancholia.
- Maria I of Portugal (1734–1816; ruled 1777–1816), known as Maria, a Louca ("Mary the Mad"). Around 1790 Maria's long-expressed anxieties developed into religiously themed delusions. Her ministers determined that she was insane and appointed her son João to govern the kingdom.
- George III of the United Kingdom (1738–1820; ruled 1760–1820) exhibited signs of mental disorder, in the form of logorrhea, as early as 1788. He fell into a profound depression after the death of his beloved daughter Princess Amelia, and Parliament delegated his state duties to George, Prince of Wales.
- Christian VII of Denmark (1749–1808; ruled 1767–1808). Although never completely incapacitated, Christian displayed severe emotional and moral instability, and members of his court and personal staff struggled to build a functioning government around him.
- Ludwig II of Bavaria (1845–1886; ruled 1864–1886) irritated his ministers with his uncontrolled spending on magnificent castles. With no end in sight, they arranged for a panel of psychiatrists to declare him insane and installed his uncle as regent. Although the ministers were motivated by political concerns, medical explanations have been offered that include frontotemporal dementia and schizotypal personality disorder.
- Otto of Bavaria (1848–1916; ruled 1886–1913) had depression, anxiety and insomnia throughout his life. In 1886, the senior royal medical officer wrote a statement declaring that Otto was severely mentally ill. Otto is believed to have had schizophrenia.
- Wilhelm II, German Emperor (1859–1941, ruled 1888–1918) is believed to have had histrionic personality disorder, as well as manic-depressive disorder, although his erratic personality has alternatively been explained as the result of complications at birth.

== Middle Eastern monarchs ==
- Pharaoh Akhenaten (died c. 1335 BC, ruled c. 1350 – c. 1335), known for elevating Aten, the sun disc, above the traditional gods. The policy scandalized the Egyptian establishment and, in the absence of clear motives, has been suspected as the product of insanity.
- Nebuchadnezzar II of Babylon (c. 634 BC – c. 562 BC, ruled c. 605 BC – c. 562 BC) is described in the Bible as displaying symptoms consistent with boanthropy.
- Majd al-Dawla, Amir of Ray (993–1029, ruled 997–1029) was experiencing boanthropy until he was cured by Avicenna, according to Persian traditions.
- al-Hakim bi-Amr Allah, Fatimid Caliph (985 – 1021, ruled 996 – 1021) became notorious in the West as the "mad caliph" for his exceptional persecution of Christians and Jews, including the mandate of distinctive dress and the destruction of the Church of the Holy Sepulchre.
- Mustafa I of the Ottoman Empire (1600 – 1639, reigned 1617 – 1618 and 1622 – 1623) was a palace prisoner throughout his life except during his brief reigns, having been spared the fratricide that normally accompanied Ottoman succession. As sultan he displayed profound eccentricity and delusions. Historians differ on whether his mental condition was a natural disability or the result of his imprisonment.
- Ibrahim of the Ottoman Empire (1615 – 1648, reigned 1640 – 1648) was, like Mustafa, a palace prisoner. During his reign he neglected politics for sexual pleasure and was easily manipulated by favorites.
- Talal of Jordan (1909–1972, ruled 1951–1952) was forced to abdicate the throne after being unsuccessfully treated for schizophrenia.

== East Asian monarchs ==
- Emperor Wenxuan of Northern Qi (526–559, ruled 550–559) became demented (kuang) through chronic alcoholism, possibly a case of Korsakoff syndrome. A biography describes him dancing and singing throughout the day and walking through the markets undressed among other outrages.
- Emperor Yōzei of Japan (869–949, ruled 876–884) was described by the 14th-century historian Kitabatake Chikafusa as affected by madness, killing people and animals without reason. His unstable and violent behavior prompted his advisors to force his abdication in 884.
- Emperor Taishō of Japan (1879–1926, ruled 1912–1926) had a variety of neurological disorders, which though at least partially physical in origin incorporated psychological elements as well. Discussion or criticism of an emperor, including that of health issues, remains a controversial subject in Japan for cultural, political, and religious reasons and is referred to as the Chrysanthemum taboo.
