= 1808: The Flight of the Emperor =

2007 book by Laurentino Gomes

1808: The Flight of the Emperor: How a Weak Prince, a Mad Queen, and the British Navy Tricked Napoleon and Changed the New World
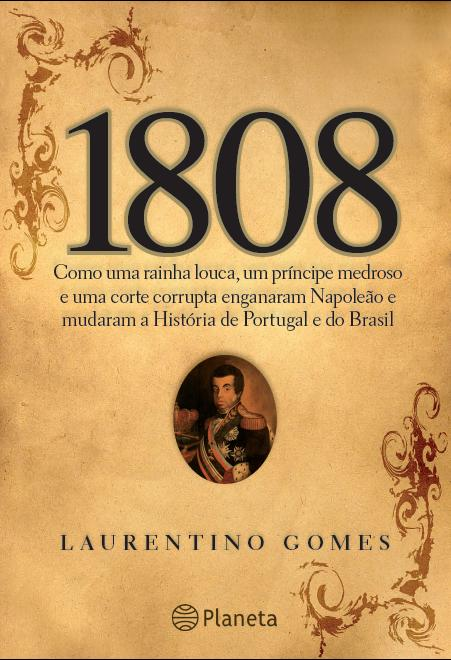
- Author: Laurentino Gomes
- Original title: 1808: Como uma rainha louca, um príncipe medroso e uma corte corrupta enganaram Napoleão e mudaram a História de Portugal e do Brasil
- Language: Portuguese
- Genre: History
- Publisher: Planeta
- Publication date: 2007
- Publication place: Brazil
- Media type: Print, paper cover
- Pages: 414 pp
- ISBN: 978-85-7665-320-2
- Followed by: 1822

1808: The Flight of the Emperor, subtitled How a Weak Prince, a Mad Queen, and the British Navy Tricked Napoleon and Changed the New World (Portuguese: 1808: Como uma rainha louca, um príncipe medroso e uma corte corrupta enganaram Napoleão e mudaram a História de Portugal e do Brasil, which translates as How a mad queen, a coward prince and a corrupt court fooled Napoleon and changed the History of Portugal and Brazil) is a book about the Independence of Brazil, written by Laurentino Gomes.

In 2008, the book was awarded as the best essay book by Academia Brasileira de Letras. It was also awarded twice a Prêmio Jabuti, at the categories "best reportage-book" and "non-fiction book of the year".

The same author published 1822, a sequel.

== Main characters ==
- Dona Maria de Portugal (the mad queen)
- Dom João VI (the coward prince)
- Napoleon Bonaparte

== See also ==
- 1822
