= Inácio de São Caetano =

Portuguese Catholic archbishop and scholar (1718–1788)

His Most Reverend Excellency Inácio de São Caetano OCD
- Titular Archbishop of Thessalonica; Inquisitor General of Portugal
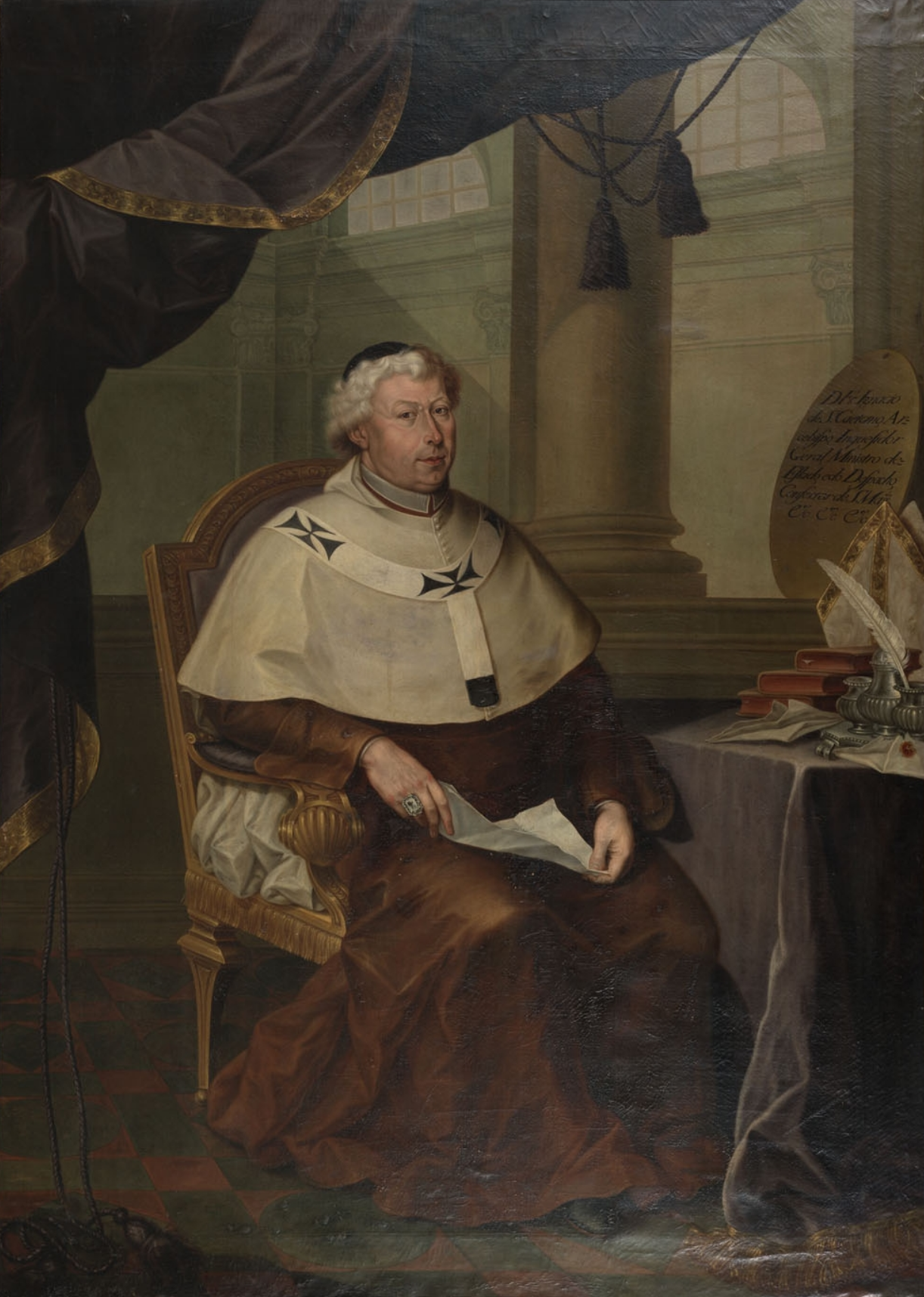
- Church: Catholic Church
- Diocese: Diocese of Penafiel
- Appointed: 5 March 1770
- Installed: 10 November 1771
- Retired: 9 December 1778
- Other post: Inquisitor General (1787–1788)

Orders
- Ordination: c. 1743
- Consecration: 10 November 1771 by Francisco de Saldanha da Gama

Personal details
- Born: 31 July 1718 Chaves, Portugal
- Died: 29 November 1788 (aged 70) Royal Palace, Queluz, Portugal
- Buried: Estrela Basilica, Lisbon
- Parents: Pedro Álvares de Teixeira; Isabel Rodrigues

Inácio de São Caetano, OCD (31 July 1718 – 29 November 1788), was a Portuguese scholar, theologian, and church leader. He was appointed the first bishop of Penafiel when the diocese was erected by Pope Clement XIV in 1770; when the diocese was suppressed eight years later, he was promoted to Titular Archbishop of Thessalonica.

Inácio de São Caetano occupied many prestigious positions in the Portuguese court: initially the protégé of Joseph of Braganza, Archbishop of Braga, in 1759 he was named confessor of the Princess of Beira (who would later accede to the throne as Maria I of Portugal); in 1787 he was made Inquisitor General of Portugal.

The death of the Archbishop of Thessalonica, as the Queen's confessor, in 1788 has been cited as one of the many contributing factors (along with the death of her husband Peter III in 1786, of her son and heir Joseph, Prince of Brazil and daughter Mariana Vitória in 1788, and the beginning of the French Revolution in 1789) that led to the Queen's mental deterioration that forced her surviving heir apparent and eventual successor Prince John to take over the government in her name as regent.

== Works ==
- O Portugal agradecido (1761)
- Gratidão desempenhada (1762)
- Ideia dum perfeito pároco, instruindo as suas ovelhas na solida piedade (1772)
- Dissertação critica e apologética da autenticidade do primeiro concilio bracarense, celebrado em 411 (1773)
- Compendio de teologia moral evangélica, para formar dignos ministros do sacramento da penitencia, etc. (1776)
