= 1822 (book) =

Book by Laurentino Gomes

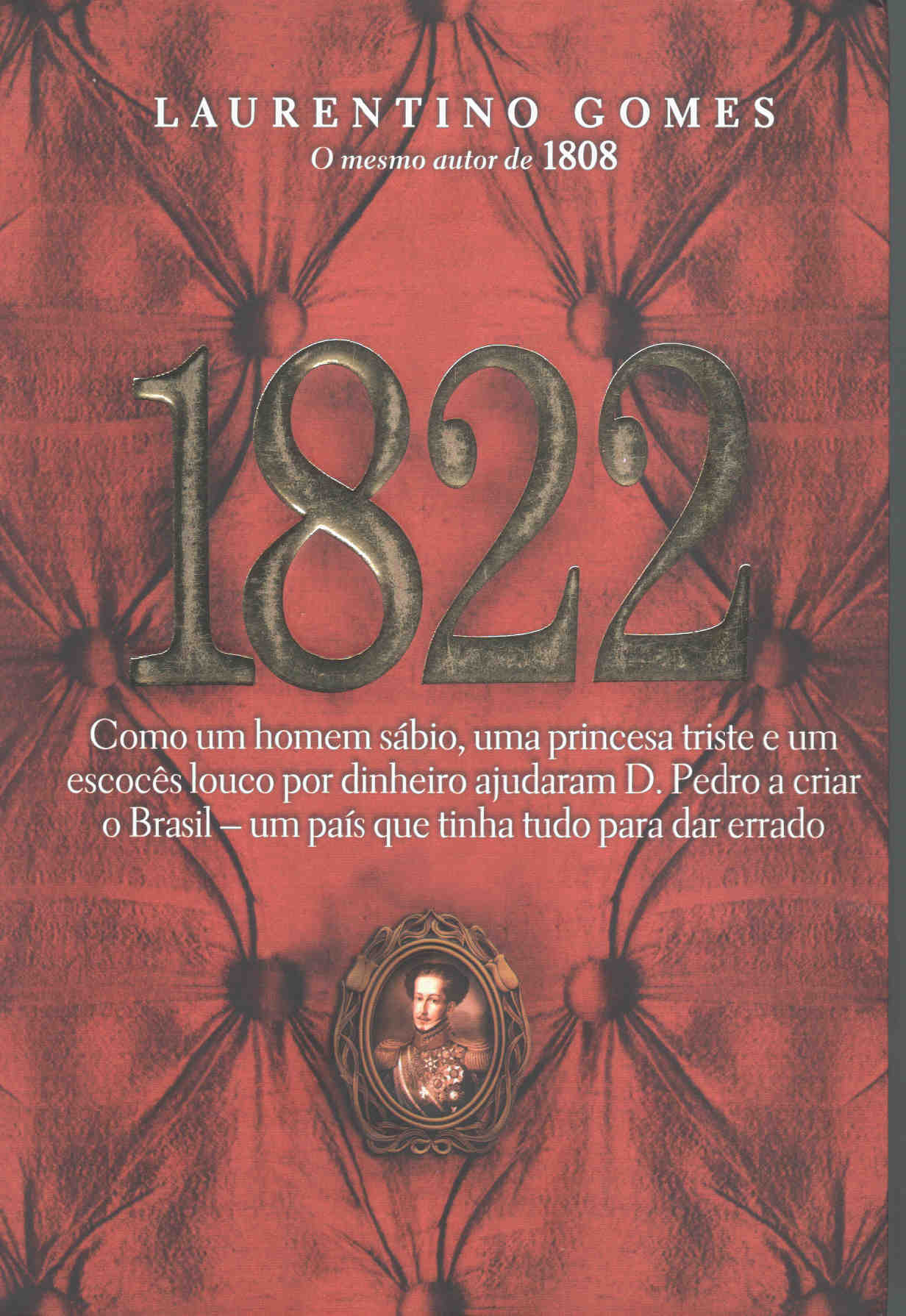
- Author: Laurentino Gomes
- Original title: 1822, Como um homem sábio, uma princesa triste e um escocês louco por dinheiro ajudaram D. Pedro a criar o Brasil, um país que tinha tudo para dar errado
- Language: Portuguese
- Genre: History
- Publisher: Nova Fronteira
- Publication date: 7 September 2010
- Publication place: Brazil
- Media type: Print, paper cover
- Pages: 351 pp
- ISBN: 978-85-209-2409-9
- Preceded by: 1808
- Followed by: 1889

1822, subtitled How a wise man, a sad princess and a money crazy Scotsman helped D. Pedro to create Brazil, a country that had everything to go wrong (in Portuguese: Como um homem sábio, uma princesa triste e um escocês louco por dinheiro ajudaram D. Pedro a criar o Brasil, um país que tinha tudo para dar errado), is a non-fiction historical book written by Laurentino Gomes, the author of 1808, and edited by Nova Fronteira.

The name of the book refers to the year in which Prince Pedro declared the independence of Brazil with the well-remembered "Cry of Ipiranga". It is a comprehensive study of the beginnings of independent life in a giant country in the New World.

The book is dedicated to all Brazilian history teachers.

In 2011, the book earned Gomes his third and fourth Jabuti Prizes, in the categories "best reportage-book" and "non-fiction book of the year".

== Main characters ==
- Dom Pedro (the Emperor)
- José Bonifácio de Andrada e Silva (the wise man)
- Dona Leopoldina (the sad princess)
- Lord Cochrane (the money-crazy Scotsman)
- Marquesa de Santos (the marchioness)

== See also ==
- 1808
