= Treaty of Badajoz (1801) =

1801 peace treaty between Spain and Portugal

Treaty of Peace between Spain and Portugal.
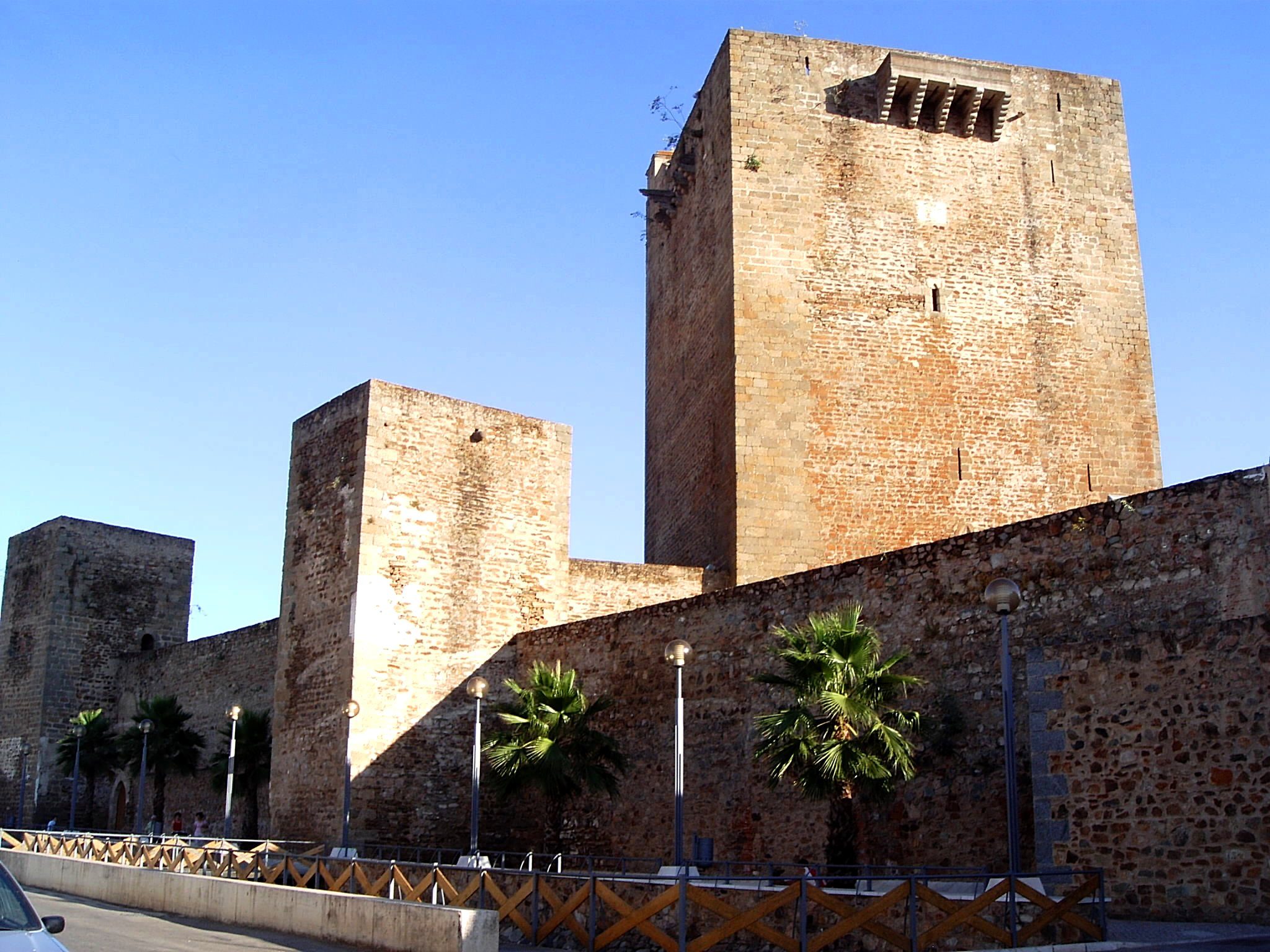
- Castle of Olivenza, ceded to Spain by Portugal
- Context: Portugal cedes the border town of Olivenza to Spain and closes its ports to British shipping
- Signed: 6 June 1801
- Location: Badajoz, Spain
- Negotiators: (Spain) Manuel Godoy; John, Prince Regent of Portugal
- Parties: Portugal; Spain

The Treaty of Badajoz is a peace treaty of the 19th century signed by Spain and Portugal on 6 June 1801. Portugal ceded the border town of Olivenza to Spain and closed its ports to British military and commercial shipping.

On the same day, Portugal signed a separate Treaty of Badajoz with France, which Napoleon, then First Consul of France, refused to sign. An amended version was agreed in September 1801, which is known as the Treaty of Madrid; France received large parts of Portuguese South America in what is now Brazil plus a payment of 20 million francs. (Note: For comparison, in 1803 the USA paid France 68 million francs or $15 million for the Louisiana Purchase, an estimated $300 million in 2016 values.)

== Background ==
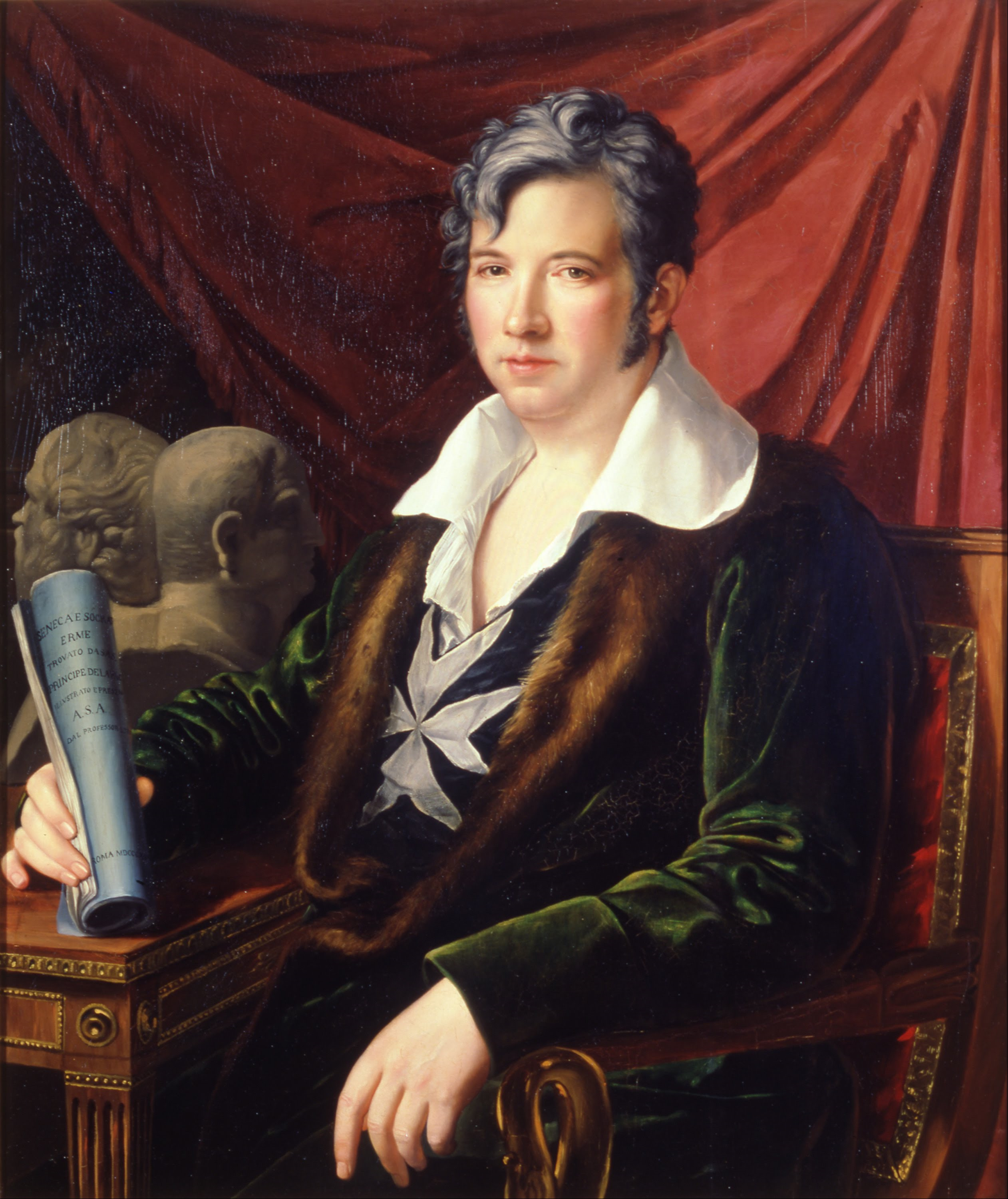
Manuel Godoy ca 1805-1808 by Madrazo

For much of the 18th century, Spain and France were allies but after the execution of Louis XVI in 1793, it joined the War of the First Coalition against the French First Republic. After being defeated in the War of the Pyrenees, Spain left the Coalition and made peace with France by the 1795 Peace of Basel.

Under Charles IV, government was controlled by Chief Minister Manuel Godoy, as the King spent most of his time hunting. Driven by Godoy, Spain agreed to an alliance with France in the August 1796 Second Treaty of San Ildefonso and declared war on Britain, then engaged in the 1798-1802 War of the Second Coalition.

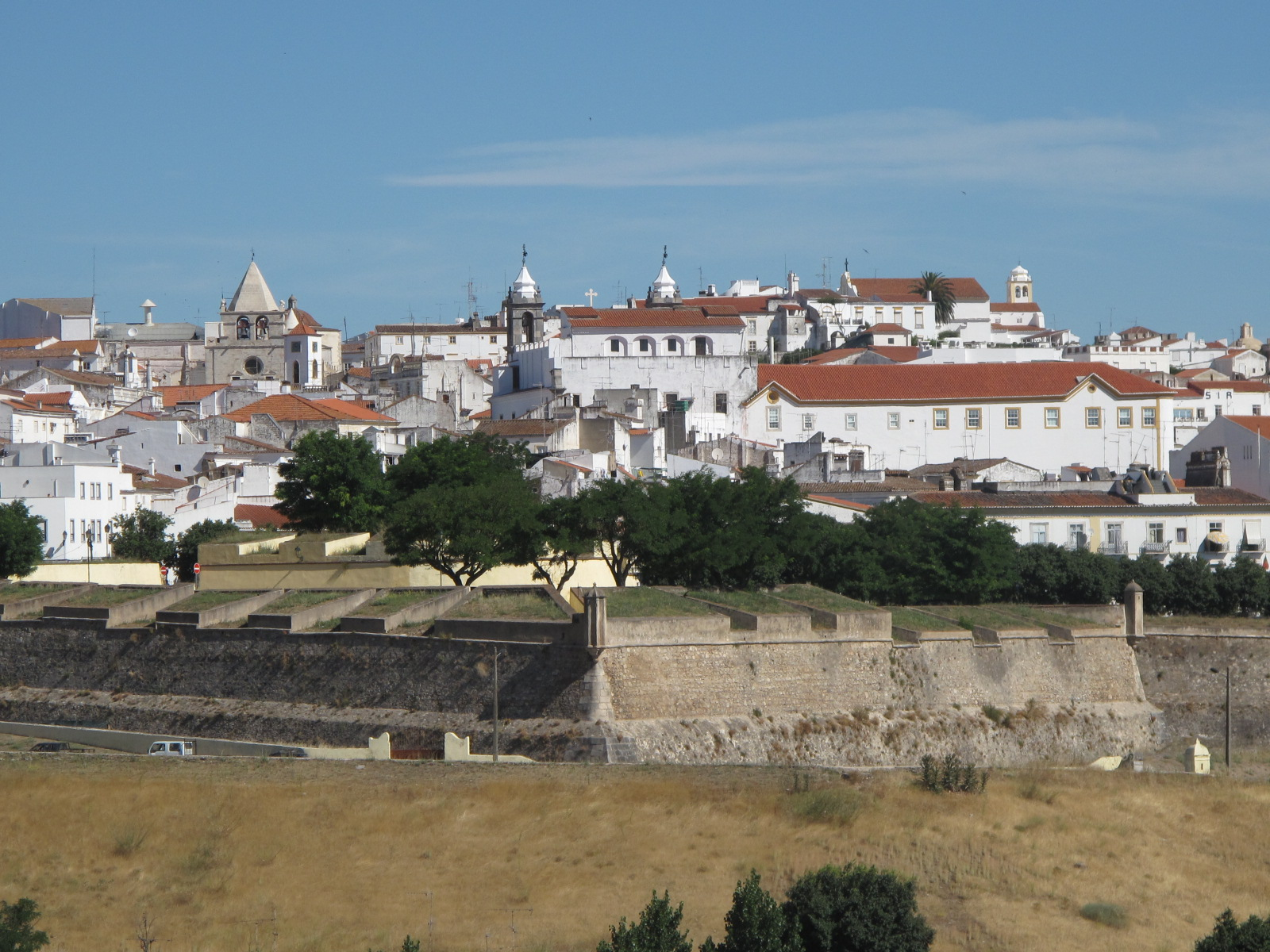
Elvas in Portugal, besieged by Spain in May 1801

Portugal had also joined the First Coalition but unlike Spain did not make peace with France. It was in a difficult position. Napoleon demanded they support his economic blockade by closing their ports to British shipping (Note: An earlier version of the 1806 Continental System.) but their economy was dependent on trade with Brazil. These links could easily be cut by a hostile Royal Navy while Britain was also the main market for Portuguese agricultural products. (Note: Portugal mainly exported corn and Port wine to Britain, importing British manufactured goods in return.) Economic self-interest meant Portugal inclined towards Britain but needed support; between 1791 and 1801, the British government supplied money, supplies and a force of 6,000 soldiers under General Charles Stuart.

Stuart captured the Spanish island of Menorca in 1798, previously occupied by Britain from 1708 to 1782 and whose recovery was the major achievement of Spain's participation in the 1778-1783 Anglo-French War. The loss undermined Godoy, who had been removed as Chief Minister in 1797 and promoted to Captain-General. British troops were withdrawn from Portugal in early 1801; Godoy returned as Chief Minister and in May, Spain invaded Portugal in the War of the Oranges. The main focus was the siege of the Portuguese town Elvas but neither side pursued the war with much enthusiasm. When a French army corps entered North-Eastern Spain to 'support' their Spanish allies, the two quickly came to terms.

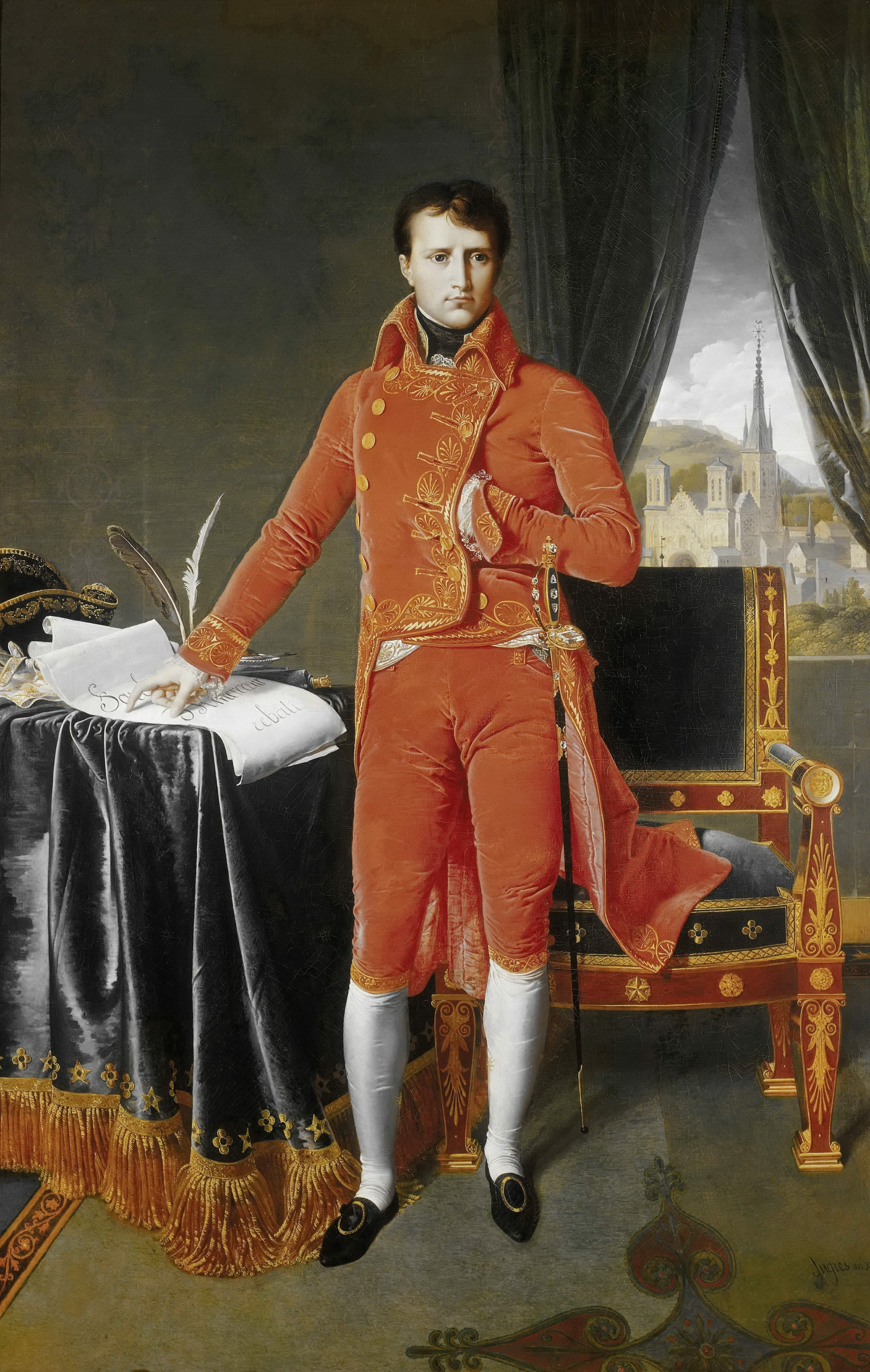
Napoleon, First Consul of France; while not present, the terms were largely inspired by him

There was also limited action in South America where Spain and Portugal had been arguing for 300 years over the delineation of borders in the Río de la Plata region. These had been fixed by the First Treaty of San Ildefonso in 1777 and the 1778 Treaty of El Pardo but war in Europe gave both sides an excuse to improve their positions. A Spanish attempt to seize Mato Grosso in modern Brazil was repulsed while the Portuguese captured the Misiones Orientales, allocated to Spain in 1778. (Note: The Portuguese were mining gold and diamonds in Mato Grosso and Minas Gerais.) Although not referenced in the Treaty of Badajoz, this territory has been part of Brazil since independence from Portugal in 1822.

== Provisions ==
On 6 June, Spain and Portugal signed the Treaty of Badajoz, the main provisions being the transfer of Olivenza to Spain and the banning of British ships from Portuguese ports. Although possession of Olivenza had never been disputed by Spain since the Treaty of Alcañices in 1297, Olivenza thereafter came under Spanish control.

On the same day, Portugal signed a second Treaty of Badajoz with France, represented by Napoleon's younger brother Lucien Bonaparte, granting France substantial territorial gains in South America. The modern border between French Guiana and Brazil is the Oyapock River, which was agreed in 1713. The proposed Treaty moved it south to the Araguari or Amapá River, taking in large parts of Northern Brazil. Portugal also agreed to close its ports to British shipping, pay an indemnity of 20 million francs and allow the import of French goods.

However, Napoleon refused to ratify the Treaty, claiming Lucien Bonaparte who signed it and his Foreign Minister Talleyrand who agreed to the terms had both been bribed by the Portuguese. (Note: Whether or not this was true, the terms of the rejected Treaty were essentially those agreed by Napoleon with Portugal in the unsigned 1797 Treaty of Paris.)

== Aftermath ==
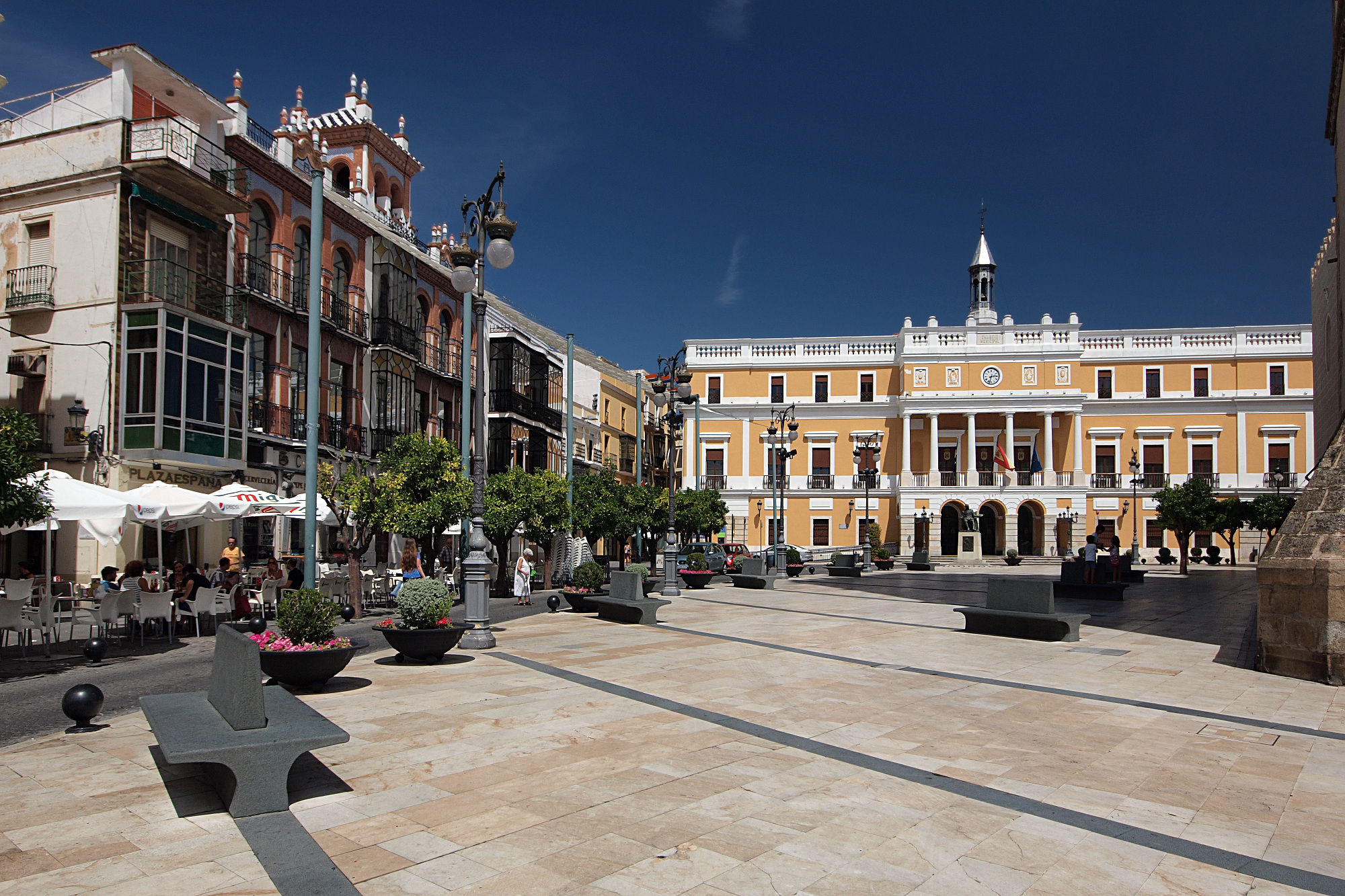
Plaza de España in Badajoz

To minimise the impact of the ban on using Portuguese ports, in July a British force occupied the island of Madeira; this was used by the Royal Navy to assemble convoys of merchant shipping that were then escorted into British ports.

However, Britain and France were already negotiating the Treaty of Amiens which ended the War of the Second Coalition in March 1802 and re-opened Portuguese ports. Spain also suspended the 1796-1808 Anglo-Spanish War and there was a pause until Britain and France recommenced hostilities in 1803.

Spain declared war on Britain in December 1804. Portugal remained neutral until Spain and France signed the 1807 Treaty of Fontainebleau dividing Portugal between them. The Treaty of Badajoz contained a clause stating any breach of its terms rendered it void; Portugal declared the Treaty of Fontainebleau constituted such a breach and nullified the agreement. The subsequent invasion of Portugal by Spanish forces also constituted a breach of the treaty's terms. For these reasons Portugal disputes Spanish sovereignty over Olivenza, the other being that its occupation contravenes the 1815 Treaty of Vienna.

In 2003, José Ribeiro e Castro, a Portuguese MEP raised the matter with the Council of Europe but while it remains an issue, it has not disrupted relations between the countries. In 2008, Olivenza and a number of other Portuguese and Spanish towns became part of the Euroregion of Extrem-Alentejo. (Note: The full list includes Alburquerque, Arronches, Badajoz, Campo Maior, Elvas, Estremoz, La Codosera, Olivenza, and Portalegre.)

== Sources ==
- Bethel, Leslie (ed), Mansuy-Diniz Silva, Andre. Portugal and Brazil; Imperial Reorganisation 1750–1808 in The Cambridge History of Latin America. Volume I (Cambridge University Press, 1984).
- Brodrick, Charles and Fotheringham; John Knight. The History of England, from Addington's Administration to the Close of William IV.'s Reign 1801–1837. Volume XI (Longmans, Green, 1906).
- Brunet-Jailly, Emmanuel. Border Disputes: A Global Encyclopedia (ABC-CLIO, 2015).
- De Bourrienne, Louis Antoine Fauvelet. Private Memoirs of Napoleon Bonaparte: During the Periods of the Directory, The Consulate, and the Empire (Carey & Lea, 1831).
- De Witt, John. Early Globalization and the Economic Development of the United States and Brazil (Praeger, 2002).
- Fournier, August. Napoleon the First: A Biography (H. Holt and Company, 1903);
- Francis, Alan David. Portugal, 1715–1808.
- Hecht, Susanna. The Scramble for the Amazon and the Lost Paradise of Euclides Da Cunha (University of Chicago, 2013).
- Nester, William. Titan: The Art of British Power in the Age of Revolution and Napoleon (University of Oklahoma Press, 2003).
- Owens, David. Spanish—Portuguese Territorial Rivalry in Colonial Río de la Plata (Yearbook. Conference of Latin Americanist Geographers).
- Payne, Stanley. History of Spain and Portugal. Volume II (University of Wisconsin Press, 1973).

== See also ==
- List of treaties
- War of the Oranges
