= Laurentino Gomes =

Brazilian journalist and writer (born 1956)

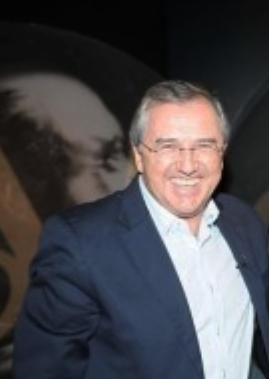
Laurentino Gomes in 2014.

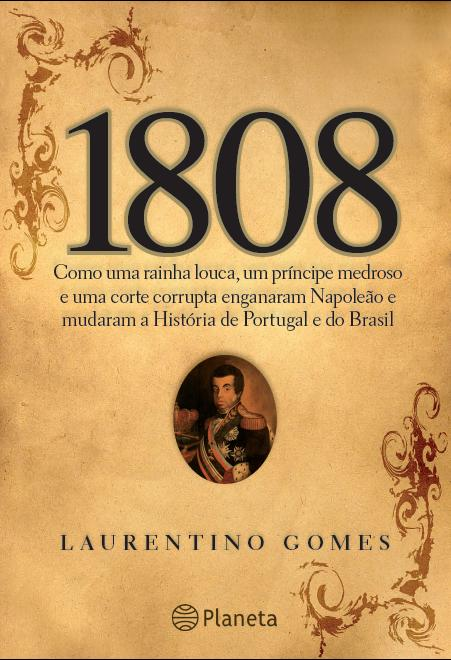
Cover of 1808

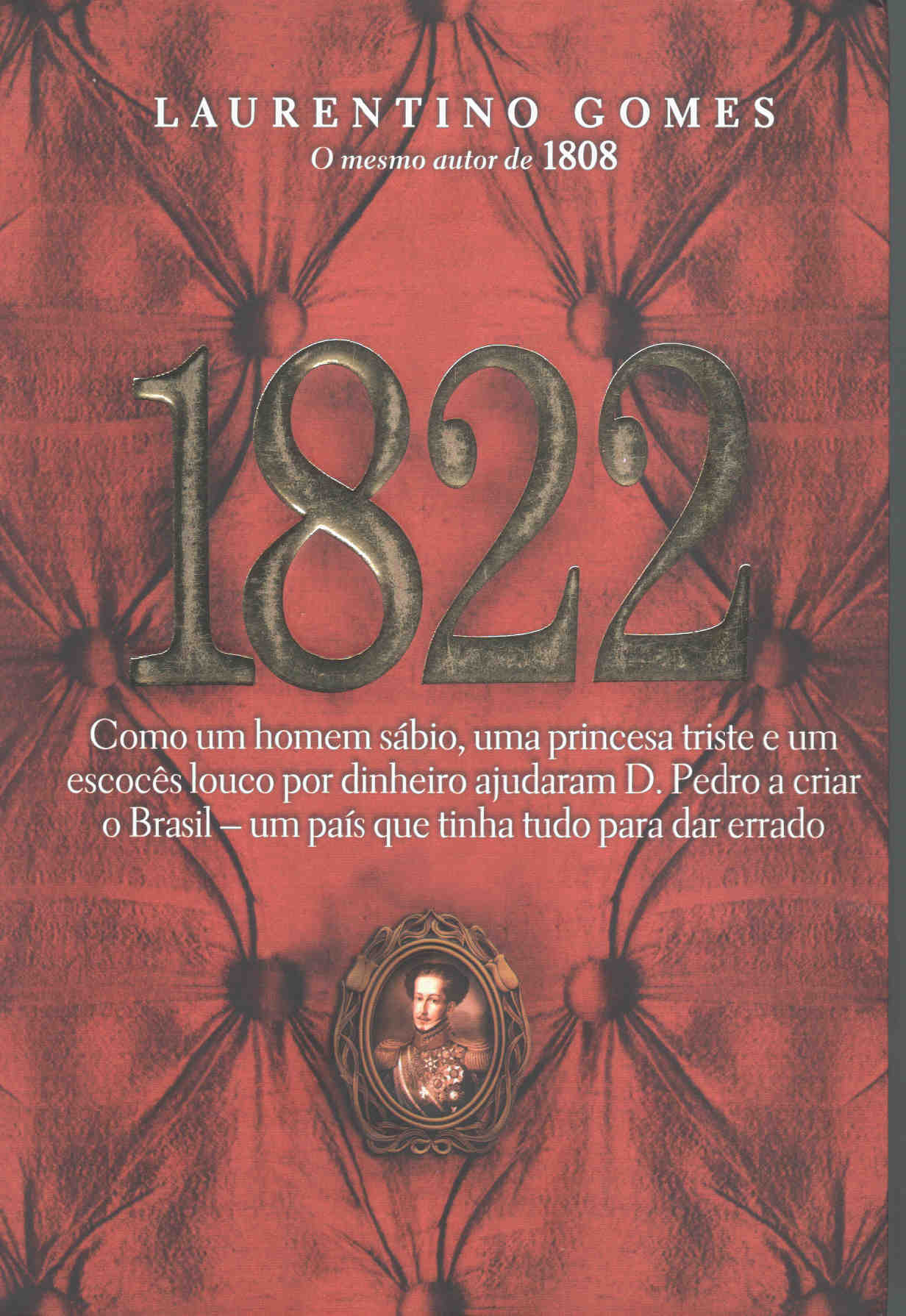
Cover of 1822

Laurentino Gomes (born 1956 in Maringá, Paraná) is a Brazilian journalist and writer. He is best known as the author of the trilogy of books that cover the history of Brazil and Portugal during the 19th century. He has already released two of the three books: 1808, about the transfer of the Portuguese Court to Brazil; and 1822, about the Independence of Brazil. He is about to release the third and final book of the series, 1889, about the Proclamation of the Republic.

In 2008, the first book, 1808, was awarded as the best essay book by Academia Brasileira de Letras. It was also awarded twice a Prêmio Jabuti, at the categories "best reportage-book" and "non-fiction book of the year". In 2011, the second book, 1822, earned Gomes his third and fourth Jabuti prizes, again in the categories "best reportage-book" and "non-fiction book of the year".

Laurentino graduated in journalism at the Federal University of Paraná, and then post-graduated in management at the University of São Paulo. He also coursed at the University of Cambridge and Vanderbilt University. He worked as a reporter and editor for O Estado de S. Paulo and Veja magazine.

In the end of March 2012, it was announced that Globo Livros would be editing his third book, 1889, which is due to be released in the second half of 2013 Regarding the work, Gomes says: "Now, in the third and last book of the series, I'll explain why the country kept as the only monarchy of the Americas, for more than 67 years, and I'll show how the Proclamation of the Republic was, in 1889."

In May 2015, he announced a new trilogy, this time focused on slavery in Brazil. The first book is due to a 2019 release, with the last one being expected for a 2022 release.

== Bibliography ==
- 1808 – Como uma rainha louca, um príncipe medroso e uma corte corrupta enganaram Napoleão e mudaram a História de Portugal e do Brasil (1808 – How a mad queen, a coward prince and a corrupt court fooled Napoleon and changed the History of Portugal and Brazil) — Editora Planeta (2007)
- 1822 – Como um homem sábio, uma princesa triste e um escocês louco por dinheiro ajudaram D. Pedro a criar o Brasil, um país que tinha tudo para dar errado (1822 – How a wise man, a sad princess and a money crazy Scotsman helped D. Pedro create Brazil, a country that had everything to go wrong) — Editora Nova Fronteira (2010)
- 1889 – Como um imperador cansado, um marechal vaidoso e um professor injustiçado contribuíram para o fim da Monarquia e a Proclamação da República no Brasil (1889 – How a tired emperor, a vain marshal and a wronged teacher collaborated for the end of the Monarchy and the Proclamation of the Republic in Brazil) — Globo Livros (2013)
