= Paulo António de Carvalho e Mendonça =

Portuguese priest, court official and cardinal

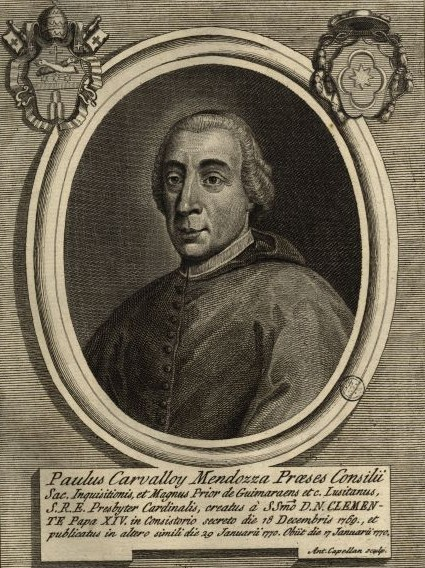
Paulo António de Carvalho e Mendonça. Engraving undated. Artist unknown.

Paulo António de Carvalho e Mendonça (1702–1770) was a Portuguese priest and a cardinal, a court official who served as supervisor of the house and properties of Queen Mariana Vítoria, President of the Senate of Lisbon, a Canon of Lisbon Cathedral, Grand Prior of the College of Guimarães and Inquisitor-General of the Holy Inquisition.

His most significant contribution was as Inquisitor-General in assisting his brother Sebastião José de Carvalho e Melo with the expulsion of the Society of Jesus from Portugal.

== Biography ==
Paulo António de Carvalho e Mendonça was born in Mercês a suburb of Lisbon on an unrecorded date in 1702, the first written record being the date of his baptism in the Chapel of Our Lady of Mercy (Portuguese: Capela de Nossa Senhora das Mercês) on 26 November of that same year. He was the son of Manuel de Carvalho e Ataíde a member of Portugal's armed forces and a genealogist, and Teresa Luisa de Mendonça e Melo.

He was one of twelve children. Those siblings most prominent in Portugal's history were: Sebastião José de Carvalho e Melo who became King José I's Secretary of State of Internal Affairs and was later given the title by which he is most often referred, Marquis of Pombal (Portuguese: Marquês de Pombal); and Francisco Xavier de Mendonça Furtado who served in the armed forces before becoming a colonial administrator in Brazil.

Carvalho e Mendonça's schools, fields of study and date of ordination to the priesthood are all unrecorded. The fact that he is described as a Monsignor of the See of Lisbon may not indicate a formal appointment but an honorific title gained through his seniority within the church structure.

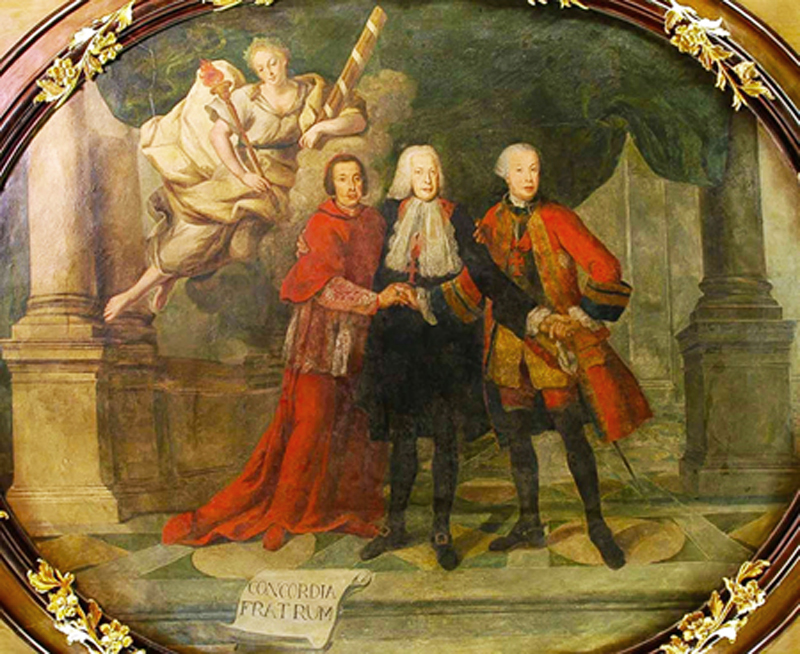
Sebastião José Carvalho e Melo, Marquis of Pombal, with his brothers Paulo de Carvalho e Mendonça and Francisco Xavier de Mendonça e Furtado. Ceiling of the Hall of Concord of the Palace of the Marquis of Pombal, Oeiras. Painted in the 18th century. Artist unknown.

The three brothers, Carvalho e Melo, Carvalho e Mendonça and Mendonça Furtado, were strongly bonded within the family as shown in a portrait of them arm-in-arm on the ceiling of the Hall of Concord within the Palace of the Marquis of Pombal.

Sibling support assisted Carvalho e Melo in carrying out many reforms in Portuguese society and drawing the monarchy into supporting his objectives. Records also show that Carvalho e Mendonça acted as a mediator between his brother and the church hierarchy, especially at times when Carvalho e Melo was in dispute with the church on other issues.

Carvalho e Mendonça held several important positions in both secular society and within the church. It is unclear when he took on the role of supervisor of the house and properties of the king's wife Queen Mariana Vítoria or how long he held it. He was also the queen's confessor at some stage. In 1762 the king appointed him as Grand-Prior of the College of Guimarães, and in 1764 as President of the Senate of Lisbon. In historical terms, his most significant appointment was as Inquisitor-General of the Inquisition, a position he held from 1760 until his death in 1770.

The context for his appointment was set within the power to handle everyday government which the king had given to his most senior minister, Carvalho e Melo from the beginning of his reign in 1750. As a result, the minister initiated a series of reforms designed to rebuild Portugal's economy and make it more self-sufficient, to control and enforce a better tax system, to develop, expand and broaden the education program, to reorganise and strengthen the armed services, and to refine the country's use of its colonies for the maximum benefits of goods, resources and income. Along with this, his moral reforms led him to abolish slavery, suppress the persecution of people on the basis of race or religion, expel the Jesuits from Portugal and the empire and overall limit the role of the church within society.

Opposed to the concept of the Inquisition as it had been set up by the church in the 16th century to enforce Catholic belief and prevent heresy, he retained its name but reshaped it so it became more like a secular court of justice. At the same time, he abolished the use of the Auto-da-fé as a ritual of penance by public burning and the measurement of limpeza de sangue (blood purity) for the identification of so-called "Old Christians".

Not all these reforms occurred at the same time, and some were brought in after Carvalho e Mendonça's death.

The appointment of Carvalho e Mendonça to head the Inquisition was ideal for several reasons: because he was senior in the Lisbon church, the papacy and hierarchy would have been satisfied; for the general population, largely Catholic, it would have seemed as if nothing had really changed with the Inquisition; and because the new appointee shared his brother's views, or was at least willing to work according to his instructions, the Carvalho e Melo "rule" would be maintained, at least for the time being. And Carvalho e Melo's used the Inquisition to achieve his goals with a heavy hand.

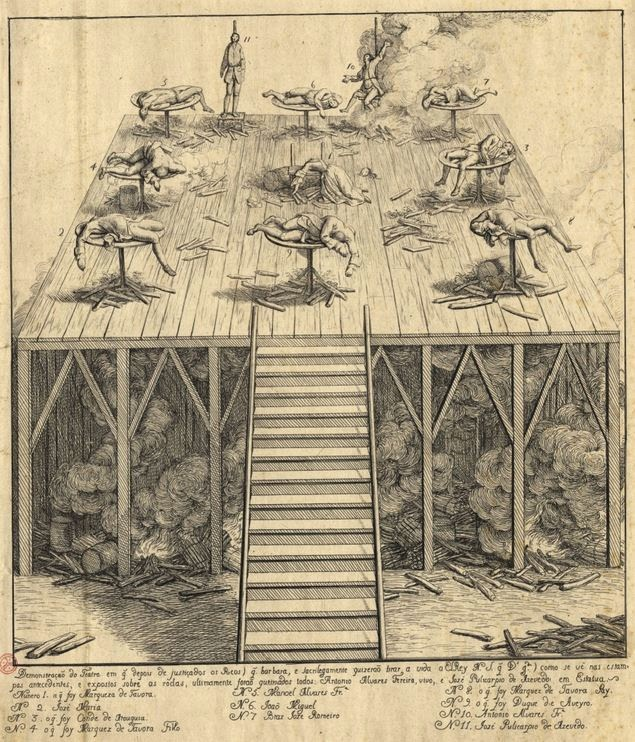
Execution of the Tavoras. Engraver unknown, 1759 or 1760.

For example, Carvalho e Melo's rivals, the Távora family, accused of attempting to assassinate the king, were tried and sentenced to public execution. A Jesuit priest, Gabriel Malagrida was closely associated with the Távoras, and also well known within the royal family especially with Queen Mariana Vítoria who had requested his return to Lisbon from Brazil. Both factors caught the minister's eye, as did his reaction to the 1755 Lisbon Earthquake which he said had occurred because of God's anger about the level of immorality in the city. Accused of high treason with regard to the Távora affair, he had to be tried by the Inquisition, but no guilt was established.

At that time Carvalho e Mendonça was not in office, but was promptly appointed by his brother in place of the existing Inquisitor General. Malagrida was tried again on charges of heresy, found guilty and sentenced for execution.

The expulsion of the Society of Jesus was largely achieved by Carvalho e Melo after he had persuaded Pope Benedict XIV to investigate various accusations. The pope himself was reluctant but went through the motions of initiating the investigation with the proviso that all findings be sent only to him. He died before the report was prepared.

Portugal was only one of several countries in which the Jesuits were being investigated and Benedict XIV was succeeded by Pope Clement XIII who defended them in the papal bull Apostolicum pascendi of 1765, and then Pope Clement XIV who suppressed them in the papal bull Dominus ac Redemptor of 1773.

Carvalho e Melo, however, did not wait on any papal response. At the beginning of 1759, he had the Jesuit's property in the Portuguese dominions sequestered, and by the end of the same year he had all Jesuits of Portuguese birth deported while those of foreign blood were kept in prison, many of them later being tried by the Inquisition and executed. Likewise in 1759 the king issued a decree suppressing the Jesuits in Portugal.

Carvalho e Mendonça's elevation to the cardinalate was recommended by the king to Clement XIV who granted it in pectore in December 1769 and announced in January 1770. However, the candidate had already died before the news reached Lisbon.

Paulo António de Carvalho died on January 17, 1770, at the age of 67 years and was buried in the Church of Our Lady of Mercy (Portuguese: Igreja Paroquial de Nossa Senhora das Mercês), Mercês.
