= Francisco Xavier de Mendonça Furtado =

His Excellency Francisco Xavier de Mendonça Furtado
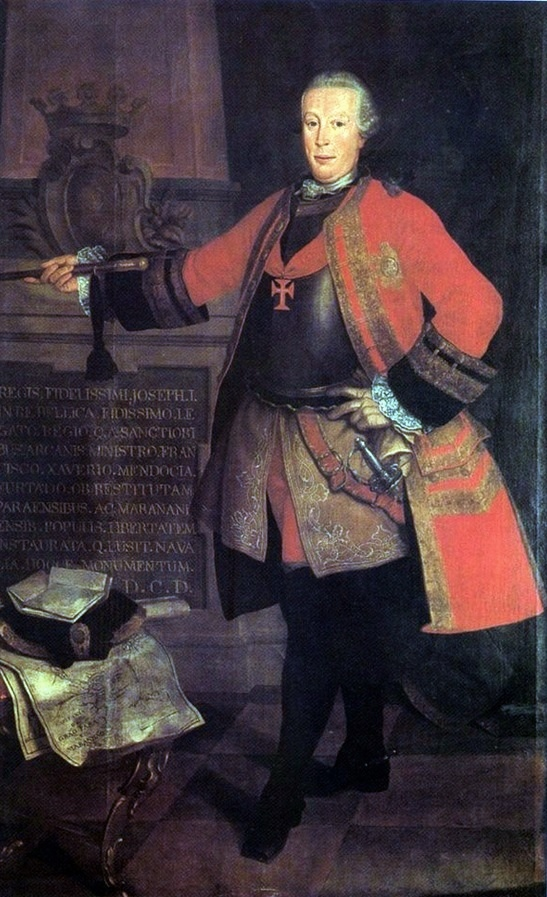
- Portrait, c. 18th century

Secretary of State of the Navy and Foreign Dominions
- In office 1760–1769
- Monarch: Joseph I
- Preceded by: Tomé Joaquim da Costa Corte-Real
- Succeeded by: Martinho de Melo e Castro

Governor of Grão-Pará
- In office 1751–1759
- Monarch: Joseph I
- Preceded by: Francisco Pedro de Mendonça Gorjão
- Succeeded by: Manuel Bernardo de Melo e Castro

Personal details
- Born: 9 October 1701 Lisbon, Portugal
- Died: 15 November 1769 (aged 68) Vila Viçosa, Portugal
- Occupation: Politician

Francisco Xavier de Mendonça Furtado (9 October 1701–1769) was a Portuguese military officer and politician who served in the Portuguese Navy rising from soldier to sea-captain. Mendonça Furtado then became a colonial governor in Brazil, and finally Secretary of State of the Navy and Foreign Dominions in the Portuguese government. His major achievements included the extension of Portugal's colonial dominions in South America westward along the Amazon basin and the carrying out of economic and social reforms according to policies established in Lisbon.

== Early life ==
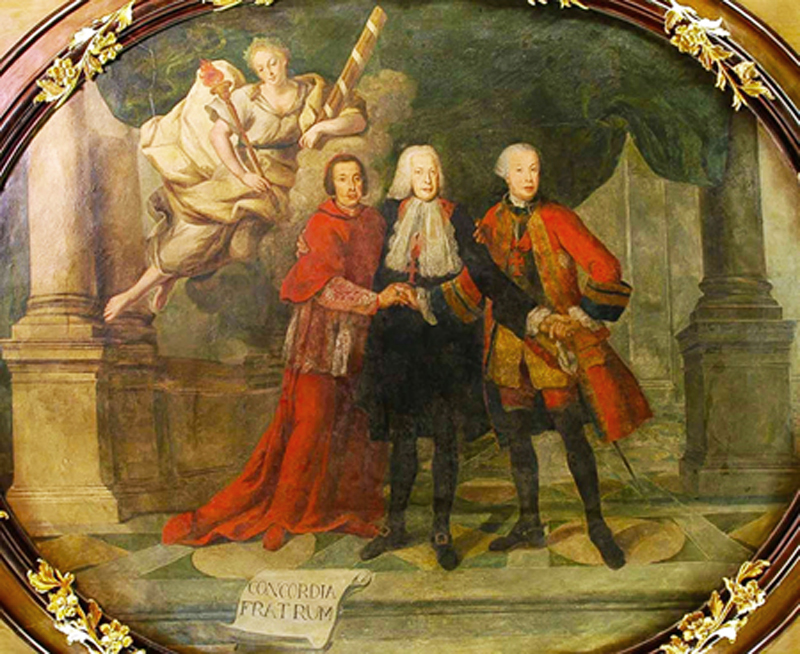
Sebastião José Carvalho e Melo, Marquês de Pombal, surrounded by his brothers: Monsignor Don Paulo de Carvalho e Mendonça and Don Francisco Xavier de Mendonça e Furtado. 18th century. Artist unknown. Roof of the Hall of Concord of the Palace of the Marquis of Pombal, Oeiras.

Francisco Xavier de Mendonça Furtado was born in Mercês, Lisbon on 9 October 1701 and baptised on 12 October 1701 in the Chapel of our Lady of Mercy on the Travessa das Mercês. His father was Manuel de Carvalho e Ataíde, a member of Portugal's armed forces and a genealogist, and his mother was Teresa Luisa de Mendonça e Melo.

As biographer Fabiano dos Santos says, "At the age of 11, when he was known by the name Francisco Xavier de Carvalho, he became a nobleman of the Royal Court (Portuguese: fidalgo da Casa Real), as his father was. Nothing is known about Mendonça Furtado's education and activities until he was 35 years old. It is possible that he dedicated himself to taking care of the family properties."

One of twelve children, his most significant siblings and half-siblings were Sebastião José de Carvalho e Melo who became King Joseph I's Secretary of State of Internal Affairs and was elevated by the king in 1769 to the title by which he is most often referred, Marquis of Pombal, and Paulo António de Carvalho e Mendonça, a member of Lisbon's clergy who became Inquisitor-General for the period 1760–1770. These three brothers were closely bonded within the family, a relationship which was further revealed in their adulthood in the way they supported each other professionally.

== Military service ==
On 14 April 1735, aged 35, Mendonça Furtado joined the Portuguese Navy where he served for 16 years rising from the rank of soldier to sea captain.

His first order was to sail to Rio de Janeiro, and then, leaving on 1 December 1736, to proceed to the Río de la Plata where Spain was attempting to drive Portuguese settlers out of Colonia del Sacramento on the north shore of the estuary.

Although referred to as a "war", the Spanish–Portuguese War of 1735 was never formally declared by either parties. Colonia del Sacramento was under Portuguese control when the war began. Spain had troops on its outskirts and had set up a naval blockade on the Río de la Plata. But with the arrival of Portugal's naval and military forces, they broke through with ease and by the last year Colonia del Sacramento was temporarily restored to Portuguese control.

Mendonça Furtado was involved in that action for five months. At the end of the war, he travelled to Rio de Janeiro and on to Pernambuco to join forces defending the Fernando de Noronha archipelago from the French. Mendonça Furtado continued his involvement with that campaign until he returned to Lisbon in 1738. From the end of that decade until 1750 he led eight military expeditions including two in the Azores and one in Tenerife, being promoted as lieutenant in 1741. Shortly before the end of his military career he was promoted again to the rank of sea captain.

== Mendonça Furtado as governor ==
=== Carvalho e Melo's reforms and Mendonça Furtado's appointment ===
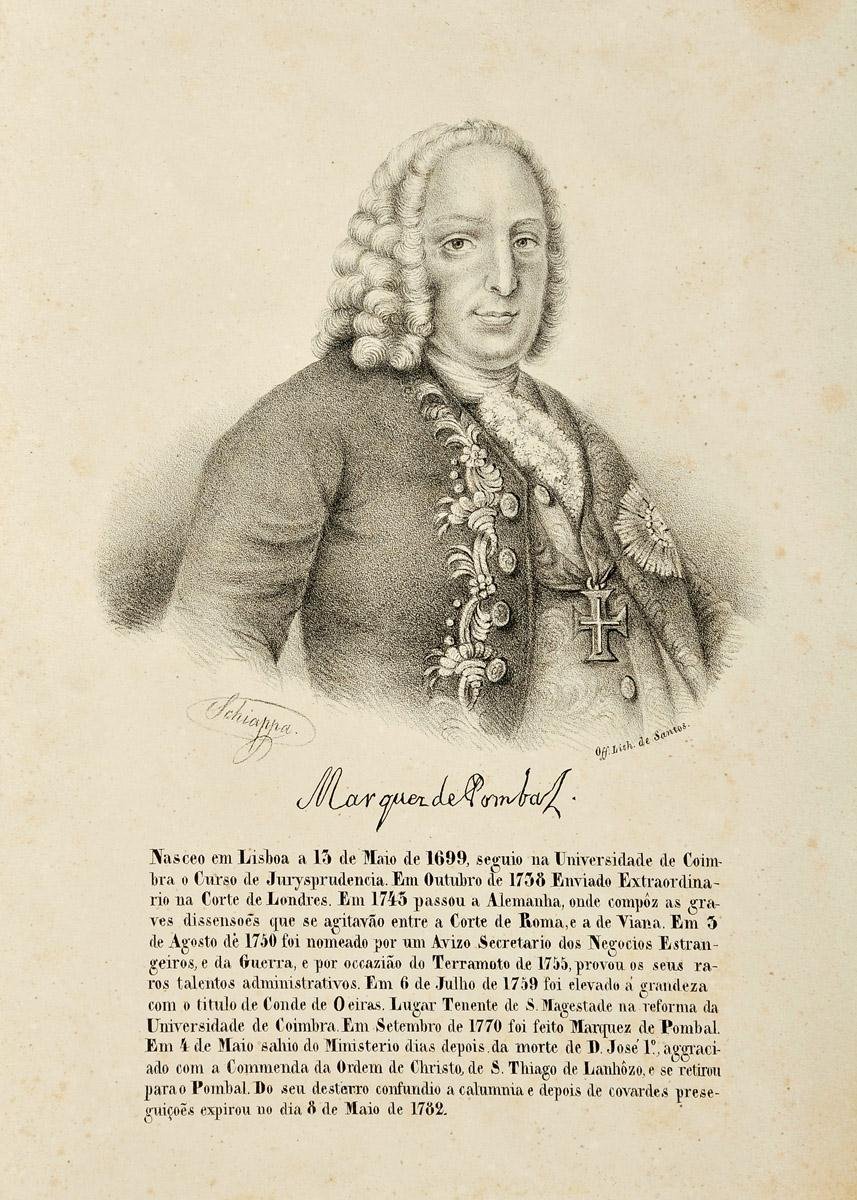
The Marquis of Pombal. The inscription "Off. Lith. de Santos" is taken to indicate the lithographer as being Pedro António José dos Santos about whom information is scant. Approximate date 1843–1846.

King John V's son and successor, Joseph I, with no interest in the day-to-day responsibilities of government, delegated authority to Sebastião José de Carvalho e Melo as Secretary of State of Internal Affairs. Carvalho e Melo, at the same time highly authoritarian and dictatorial but also a vigorous reformist, had among his many goals the rebuilding of the country's economy so it could recover from its own demise in the last years of John V's reign.

His approach was highly centralist; he saw himself at the helm of the entire structure and he always wanted to know what was going on. This was not only in regard to Portugal's internal operation but the colonies as well, and this quickly flowed into a reshaping of the governmental and administrative structure in Brazil from which he required regular reporting to himself and unquestioning obedience to any directives issued by him. Among Carvalho e Melo's broad range of reforms, possibly the most significant for the operation of the empire's economy was the creation of the Royal Treasury in 1761. In theory it involved the abolition of the old model in which the treasury's operation had been under the direct and absolute control of the monarch (as it had been, for example, under King John V). This new treasury was under Carvalho e Melo's direct control, it had seniority over all other executive and administrative bodies except, theoretically, the king himself, and it processed and administered all income and expenditure related to those bodies in both Portugal and the rest of the empire.

In view of the failure of the early system of captaincies adopted in Brazil, Carvalho e Melo acted quickly by reconstructing the colony into two states. This took place on 31 July 1751 when the colony was divided into the State of Brazil, in the south, which had already existed since 1621, and a new State of Grão-Pará and Maranhão, established in the north, to which Carvalho e Melo had already appointed his brother Mendonça Furtado as its governor and captain-general.

With the creation of the new state, its capital was moved from São Luís, located on the Atlantic shoreline, to Belém do Pará, sometimes referred to as Nossa Senhora de Belém do Grão Pará and Santa Maria de Belém, on the Amazon River's south shore near its mouth. The new location was based on Carvalho e Melo's request that Portugal develop a stronger presence at this point and westwards along the river.

=== The Royal Instructions ===
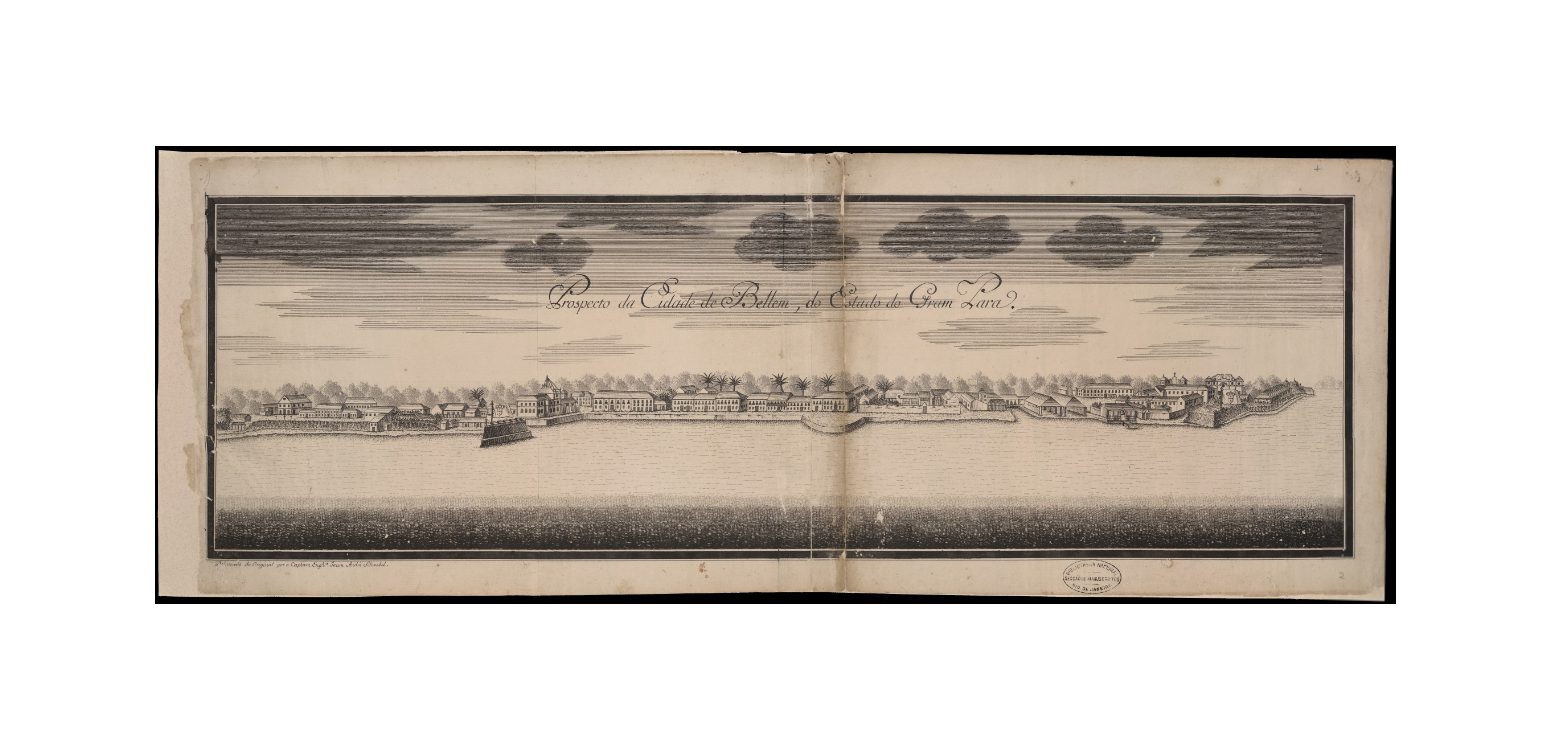
Johann Andreas Schwebel. View of the city of Bellem (Belém), State of Gram Pará (1756). Collection from the views of the villages, and more remarkable places that are found on the map that the engineers created on expedition starting from the city of Pará to the village of Mariua in the Rio Negro, 1756. Drawing in Indian ink. Collection of the National Library of Brazil

At the outset, Mendonça Furtado received a set of 38 directives usually referred to as the Instruções Régias (Royal Instructions) or Instruções Secretas (Secret Instructions) dated 31 July 1751. The instructions were described as a "Portuguese Project for the Amazon". Although issued under the king's name and penned by his Secretary of State for Overseas Affairs, Diogo de Mendonça Côrte Real, given the king's distance from the functions of government, and taking into account the close relationship these instructions have with Carvalho e Melo's own objectives, it seems more than likely that he was either the author or directly involved in drafting the document.

One summary of the instructions says they are focussed largely on three topics: (1) "the status of the Amazon's Indian population"; (2) "the Jesuits and other religious orders … especially with regard to potential reforms to their relationship with the Indians"; and (3) "further surveying the nature and extent of the region's commercial potential, including the expansion of trade and the potential for establishing plantations." "The overall impression left by the Instructions, especially in the convergence of the three categories just mentioned, is of a mandate for Mendonça Furtado to ensure that the state of Grão Pará and Maranhão and its inhabitants – both the Portuguese settlers and the Indians – effectively and efficiently provided both economic and political support to the Portuguese Crown."

However, "The creation of this new administrative unit [ie the state of Grão-Pará and Maranhão] demonstrates the centrality that the frontier region acquired with the continuity of the policy of expansion of the Portuguese Empire further west of the Amazon River, through the infiltration of the rivers Negro, Branco, Madeira, Tapajós, Xingu and Tocantins. The occupation of the territories nearer and nearer to the Spanish borderlands acquired a fundamental importance for the Portuguese Empire in the last three decades of the seventeenth century, aimed at the strengthening of monarchical sovereignty over these vast territories, as well as the opening of new commercial channels that could generate more wealth". It could be, then, that the expansion and consolidation of Portuguese territories in the face of competition from Spain was the overarching motive behind the creation of the two states. This would have to be achieved to ensure that Portugal's income could be guaranteed, and it is clear from the instructions that Carvalho e Melo saw it this way.

Apart from the three topics, the instructions also gave priority to security and fortification, and it was only well into the document where colonial development and income was finally discussed:

"I urge you to look carefully at the means of securing the State, as well as to make commerce flourish, in order to achieve the first aim … and you will be careful, as far as possible, to populate all possible lands, introducing new settlers." (Instruções Régias, Inst. 27.)

Discussion about security occurred in the other instructions: for example, regarding the requirements for armed forces the document says, "I instruct you to inform me of the number of troops that may be necessary for the service of the State" (Instruções Régias, Inst. 24), and in another Mendonça Furtado was told to review, strengthen and fortify his region, building new defences where needed (and to direct the Governor of Maranhão to do the same). (Instruções Régias, Inst. 28.)

=== Mendonça Furtado takes office ===
On 8 May 1751, only a few days before his departure from Lisbon, Mendonça Furtado was admitted as a Knight of the Order of Christ. Santos says, "There is no doubt that the granting of the habit of Christ was meant as a reward for his military services, as well as an incentive to fulfill the new commission in Portuguese America".

When Mendonça Furtado arrived in Belém do Pará in October 1751, it was the largest settlement in the Amazon region, and the only shipping port, although impaired by the fact that in the early 18th century the movement of shipping between it and the Iberian peninsula was rare and irregular compared with other major centres such as Recife, Salvador and Rio de Janeiro.

The problem was that, with the Portuguese settlement largely concentrated on the coast, the state's overall population was low. Along the Amazon and its tributaries few settlers had moved westward into the more remote areas, there was only a tiny number of smaller towns and villages, the Indian population was small and few African slaves had been added to the workforce.

From early in the colonization of Brazil, several Catholic religious orders had set up missions. The first to arrive were the Jesuits. This was an outcome of the close relationship between the Order and the Portuguese monarchy, and they had quickly taken a dominant role on the colony's development through their ownership of the largest properties in the region and their involvement in areas such as ranching, agriculture, silviculture and fishing.

As their source of labour, the Jesuits removed Indians from their own living environment and forced them to live in aldeias (villages) located at Jesuit missions, thereby leaving many old Indian villages unoccupied. The Indians' work was controlled by the Jesuits in slave-based relationships.

Clearly Mendonça Furtado was facing no easy task, for four main reasons: the Jesuits were 'suspected' of exploiting the Indians and treating them harshly if they refused to work as instructed; the Jesuits' opposition to any intrusion in their affairs, including their control over large number of Indians, was predictable; the settlers had a long history of abusive, exploitative and low cost dependence on Indian slaves which had continued long after African slaves started arriving because the imported slaves were a great deal more expensive; and the concept of enforced labour was deeply embedded in Brazil's economic and social structure.

Knowing how the Jesuits would respond, the instructions directed Mendonça Furtado to seek assistance from a strong supporter of the monarchy, the Bishop of Belém do Pará, Miguel de Bulhões e Souza [or Sousa] in setting the new laws governing Indian employment in place especially by instructing the Jesuits to concentrate their work on religious instruction. But the idea of restricting the Jesuits' activities was not stimulated by a desire to "punish" them: Carvalho e Mello's clear motivation was economical, because by placing a stranglehold on their involvement in production, more opportunities would be created for others to invest in agricultural and commercial projects, and the state of Grão-Pará and Maranhão's contribution to Portugal's economy would be able to increase.

In the same way, the settlers' response was foreseen in the instructions, and Mendonça Furtado was directed to ensure that they "observe this Resolution completely and religiously" by persuading them to see the benefits of using African slaves, a difficult task because the cost of setting up and running plantations and other large enterprises in the Amazon was higher than in other parts of Brazil; and given the Jesuits' near monopoly on Indian labour and their ability to outbid others in buying African slaves, the Amazon's business developers had struggled to survive.

As Mendonça Furtado later reported, he issued "positive orders for the civilization of the Indians, to enable them to acquire a knowledge of the value of money, something which they had never seen, in the interests of commerce and farming, and … familiarity with Europeans, not only by learning the Portuguese language, but by encouraging marriage between Indians and Portuguese, which were all the most important means to those important ends and together to make for the common interest and the well-being of the state." Furthermore, having defined the vital strands of output as sugar, tobacco and gold, measures were set in place to protect and support these producers. A price control system was placed over all staple items so colonists could survive on their existing incomes, and an inspection system was set up to monitor it.

Within a year of taking office, fully aware of the clandestine warehousing, illegal exporting and smuggling, along with systems that had enabled traders to bypass the crown's taxes on exports, he had channelled all exporting through state-managed outlets with the movement of goods carefully recorded. That all sounded good in theory; in reality, controlling the movement of goods out of Brazil was next to impossible because there were too many ways of doing so, and few people to monitor where, when and how it was being done.

As for the plan to liberate and Europeanise the Indians, especially those under the control of the Jesuits within the aldeias, married to the idea that they would then be induced to populate regions closer to the borders, this, too, led nowhere.

=== Defence and fortification in the Amazon Basin ===
As already discussed, the Instruções Régias directed Mendonća Furtado to address the colony's needs for security and fortification.

Records show that in 1751 there were only about 300 men allocated to Belém and the forts of Macapá, Guamá, Gurupá, Tapajós, Pauxis and the Rio Negro, and that the forces in Maranhão were also low. Evidence also shows that the provision of arms and ammunitions was insufficient. Mendonça Furtado's own assessment saw the situation in the same way and he quickly conveyed the message back to Lisbon.

Action followed to strengthen the defence system by increasing the volume of men and equipment and expanding the fortifications. A massive enlistment program was carried out in Portugal and in April 1753 900 men were shipped to Brazil to form two regiments, one to be based in Belém and, in principle, the other at Macapá. With them came 42 families made up of 109 women and children, indicating a significant sudden population increase in just these two centres. In the same fleet that transported these people, other ships carried arms, military equipment and uniforms in quantities suitable for the travelling regiments and for those soldiers already on the ground in the northern state. These and other ships also carried as ballast large stones for the building of fortification. Many of these were used in the coastal areas while others were transported in canoes up the rivers for use in new forts.

The use of Macapá for defence purposes was strategic because of its location on the Atlantic coast and on the Amazon's northern estuary at the junction between the river's mouth and the ocean. A military detachment had been located in a small fortified structure there since 1738. But this was clearly inadequate as far as the Portuguese government was concerned, and the message was well-conveyed to Mendonça Furtado. By December 1751, within three months of his arrival, he travelled to the site, immediately initiating plans for the building of a larger fort. He also arranged for settlers to be brought in from the Azores so there was a reasonably-sized civil population to support the expected increase in armed services. By 1752 he had heard that enlistment was being carried out in Portugal. As already mentioned, in 1753 the two regiments arrived from Lisbon, and although one was meant to go to Macapá, Mendonça Furtado had said this could only happen if the fort was completed. He continued to apply pressure on those building the fort, especially in 1754 when the French invaded north of the Oyapock River (Rio Oiapoque) into what became French Guiana.

The fact that the fort, now known as the Fortaleza de São José de Macapá was not completed until 1771, 20 years after Mendonça Furtado set the plan in motion, raises questions when considered against the conclusion of that same instruction which reads:

"I warn you that both this fortress and all the others that are made for the defence and security of this state, must be done in a manner that does not appear to be a fear of our restrictions, while at the same time caution must be maintained so we are not surprised by the renewal of false claims, making it impossible because we have to dispute them all forcefully." (Instruções Régias, Inst. 28.)

Another site of importance to Lisbon was the Rio Branco about which they learnt in 1750 reports that the Dutch had entered the area from Suriname via the Essequibo River (Portuguese: Rio Eseqüebe) so they could trade with the Indians and take them into slavery. The king and his Overseas Council responded at the end of 1752 by ordering Mendonça Furtado "that without any delay a fortress should be erected on the banks of the said Rio Branco, at the place which you consider to be most proper, first having consulted with the engineers whom you appoint for this examination, and that this fortress is always staffed with a company of the Macapá regiment, which changes annually."

Warnings continued to come for about 20 years, one reporting that the Paraviana Indians had gained possession of weapons, gunpowder and shot. But no action was taken to erect the fort until a report arrived in 1775 that Dutch settlers had been living on Portuguese territory for four years. The Lisbon government responded by ordering the erection of what became known as the Forte de São Joaquim do Rio Branco (Fort of São Joaquim do Rio Branco) and work started in that same year, more than twenty years after the king's original order was issued. The government clearly wanted Mendonça Furtado to get things done quickly, and some signs indicated that he took that seriously, and yet lethargy or inaction somewhere - and was it Lisbon's? - somehow got in the road.

==== Preparation for the journey on the Amazon ====
In 1752 Mendonça Furtado was appointed both as plenipotentiary for Portugal's crown, and under the Treaty of Madrid arrangements as its commissioner for the northern region.

In that same year Spain appointed José de Iturriaga as its First Commissioner making specific mention of the rivers of Javari, Japurá, Negro and Madeira for his attention, while at the same time he was also appointed as commander (Spanish: comandante general) of new settlers on the Orinoco River and given other tasks including leading a major scientific research program on that river.

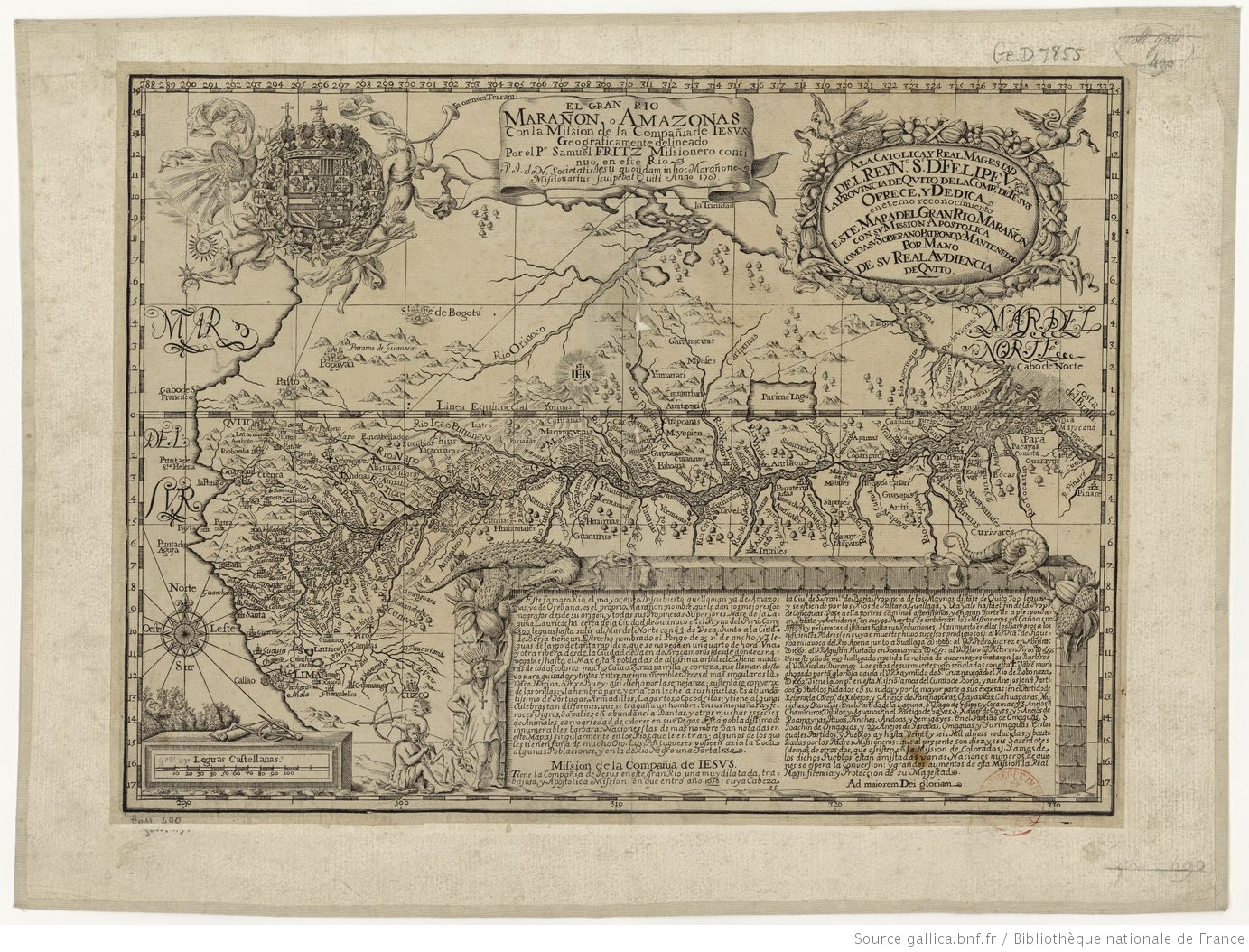
The great river Marañon, or Amazon, with the mission of the Company of Jesus geographically delineated by Father Samuel Fritz, a continuous missionary in this river. P.J. de N. Societatis Jesu, quondam in hoc Maranone missionarius, sculpebat. 10 Castilian leagues. Collection of the Bibliothèque nationale de France.

As it turned out, and probably unbeknown to both the Portuguese government and Mendonça Furtado, Iturriaga did not leave Spain until 1754 and rather than travelling directly to meet with Mendonça Furtado, he went to Venezuela and accompanied the scientists on their program while at the same time working with the other Spanish commissioners on the so-called Expedition of Limits to the Orinoco (Spanish: Expedición de Límites al Orinoco) which involved demarcating the borders along the Orinoco.

Prior to Mendonça Furtado's time in office, large parts of the northern Amazon basin had not yet been fully explored, although Spain's mappers had been active since 1637. The first accurate and complete map of the Amazon and Orinoco Rivers had been published in 1707 after being charted by Czech Jesuit Samuel Fritz who had journeyed by river from Quito in Ecuador to Pará. However, even the most detailed maps at that time were not sufficient to help him meet the obligations he had been given in the instructions.

Rather than wait for news from Spain about their commissioners' movements, he decided to make an independent journey upstream on the Amazon. To help plan the details, he consulted with people such as the Bishop of Belém do Pará, members of the Câmara de Belém, and those settlers who had shown interest in cooperating with the government.

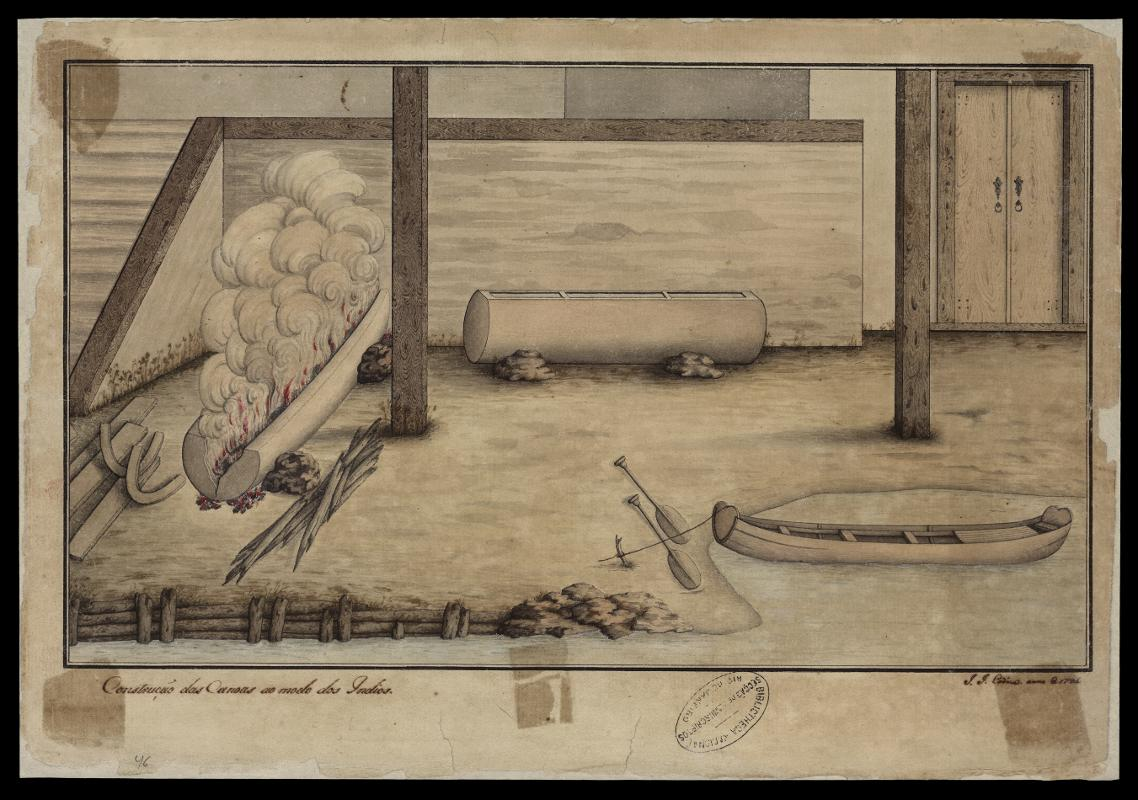
Construction of canoes in the Indian way (1784). Hand-coloured etching by Joaquim José Codina (18th Century: Portugal - ca. 1793:?). Collection of the Biblioteca Nacional do Brasil.

Frustrations soon arose, though. The canoes required to transport himself and the working party he had originally intended to buy ready-made either from Indians in the aldeias and from settlers. The Jesuits were obstructive to this and he was only able to obtain a small number.

His next proposal, contained in correspondence he sent to Lisbon, was that the canoes be made on his royal estate where timber was freely available. For that he required funds to cover the costs including additional labour. However, with correspondence flowing slowly backwards and forwards across the Atlantic, he found himself waiting for an answer.

Finally, rather than delay any longer, without Lisbon's approval he decided to employ Indians who had been given permission to work for him. Further complications were caused, though, as Indians abandoned their work without warning, even using canoes they had already made to return to their aldeias. This meant his plan to set off in May 1754 was delayed until October of that year.

==== Start of the journey ====
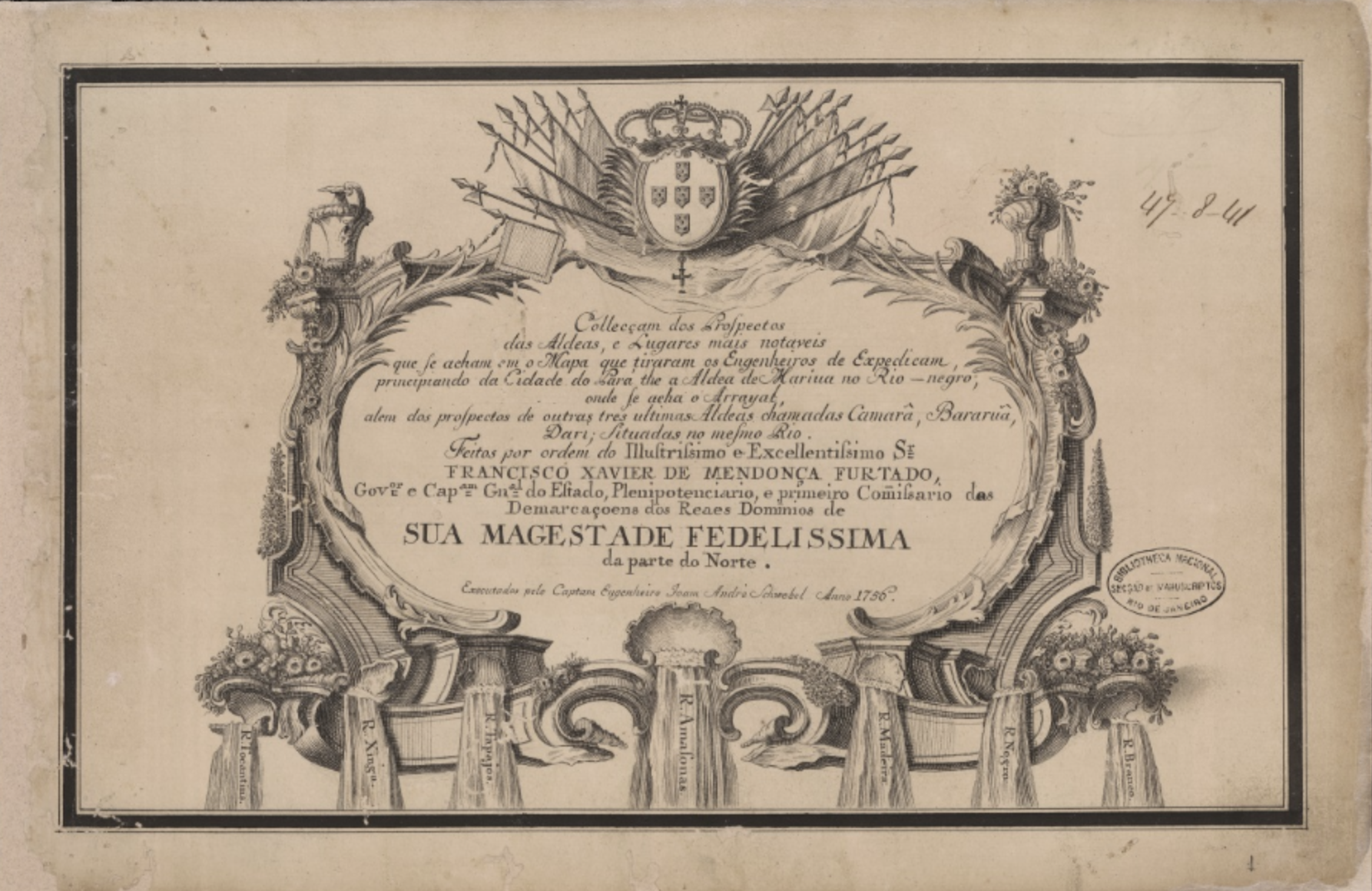
Title Page. Collection from the prospects of the villages, and more remarkable places that are found on the map that the engineers created on expedition starting from the city of Pará to the village of Mariua in the Rio Negro, 1756. Drawing in Indian ink by João André (Johann Andreas) Schwebel. Collection of the Biblioteca Nacional do Brasil.

The departure from Belém was carried out in grand, viceregal style.

"On 2 October 1754, His Excellency left his palace accompanied by all the different people, and went to the church of Our Lady of Mercy where he heard Mass and received communion, and after having made this pious and Catholic step embarked with the Most Excellent and Reverend Lord Bishop [D. Miguel de Bulhões] in his large canoe, with the general feeling and greeting of all those who accompanied him to the beach, and with him all the expedition people embarked in their canoes and then set off, enlisted infantry, who had formed on the beach, providing three discharges of musketry, followed by the salvos of all the artillery of the forts."

In its entirety the flotilla was made up of 28 canoes, fitted with sails for use when wind was available, and all painted in the vice-regal colours of red and blue. Five carried storage and infantry, five were fishing canoes to help provide food during the journey, eleven transported geographers, astronomers, engineers, cartographers, artists and other officials who were to assist the governor with mapping and demarcation. Vice-regal staff in attendance included the Secretary of State, the Chamber Adjutant and the Purveyor of the Royal Estate. Also, to provide necessary food resources on the way, especially flour, he wrote in advance to clergy in the largest aldeias asking them to hold these supplies for collection on his party's arrival.

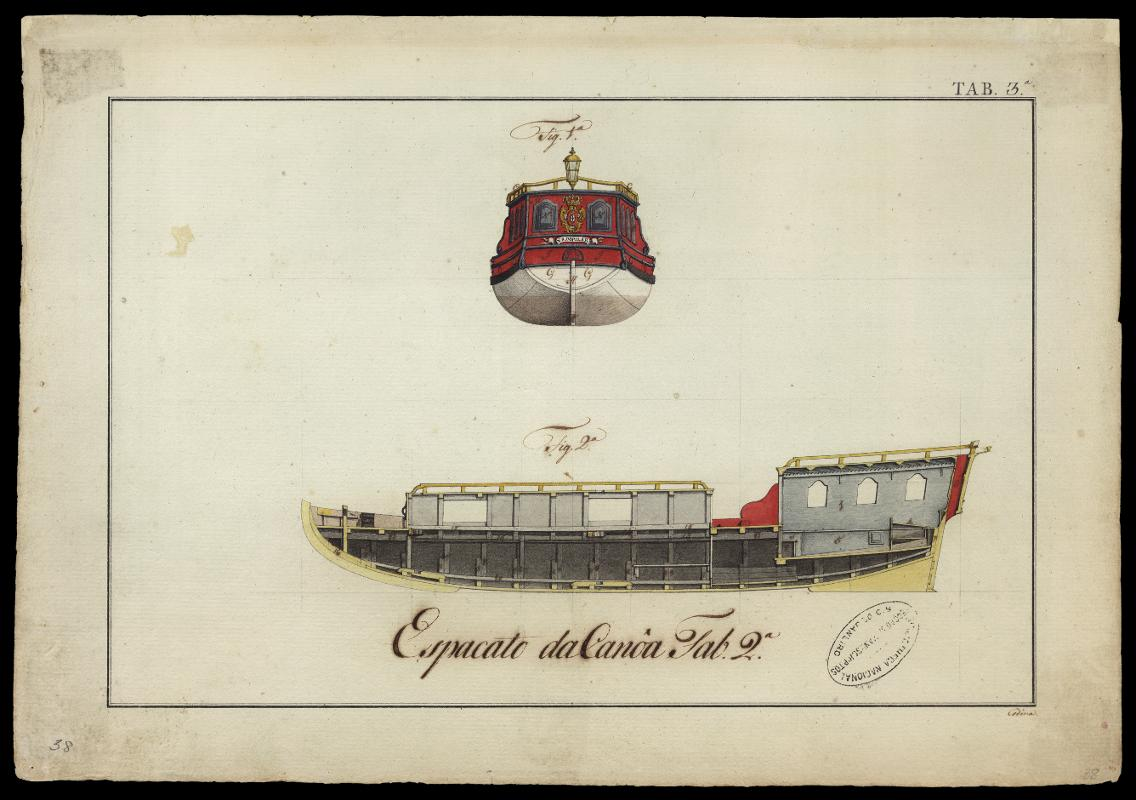
Section of a canoe built for the Scientific Expedition of Alexandre Rodrigues Ferreira. Hand-coloured etching by Alexandre Rodrigues Ferreira (18th Century: Portugal - ca. 1793:?) Publication date unknown. Collection of the Biblioteca Nacional do Brasil.

The two largest vessels had clearly been designed under Mendonça Furtado's direction so they represented his status as governor and provided him with comfort. His own canoe, the larger of the two and about the size of a yacht and probably very similar to that illustrated here (left), included:

"…a rather roomy chamber, all lined with crimson damask with golden decoration; this chamber was built in with coffer chests covered with cushions of the same crimson, and in addition to these, it had six more footstools and two upholstered chairs with a large table and a cabinet of yellow wood with the portrait of the king in the top. There were four windows on each side, and two on the top panel, all of which were trimmed with finely crafted carving, and the royal arms in the middle, all very well gilded, and the rest of the canoe painted red and blue."

Both vessels had rowing crews, 26 for the governor's and 16 for the other, dressed in a uniform of white shirts, blue pants and blue velvet caps.

At the outset the entire party numbered 1,025 people, including 511 Indians 165 of whom deserted during the journey. Bishop Bulhões travelled with the governor for the first week before returning to Belém where he acted as executive and provided a channel for correspondence between the governor and Lisbon.

==== Stages of the journey ====
The journey itself took three months and on the way, Mendonça Furtado visited a number of aldeias, enghenos (sugar mills) and plantations, observing and assessing at first hand the Indians' living and working conditions, their relationship with the Jesuits, the Jesuits' attitude towards himself, and the Amazon basin's overall potential for future use. The whole journey was noted in log book style by the Secretary of State João Antônio Pinto da Silva.

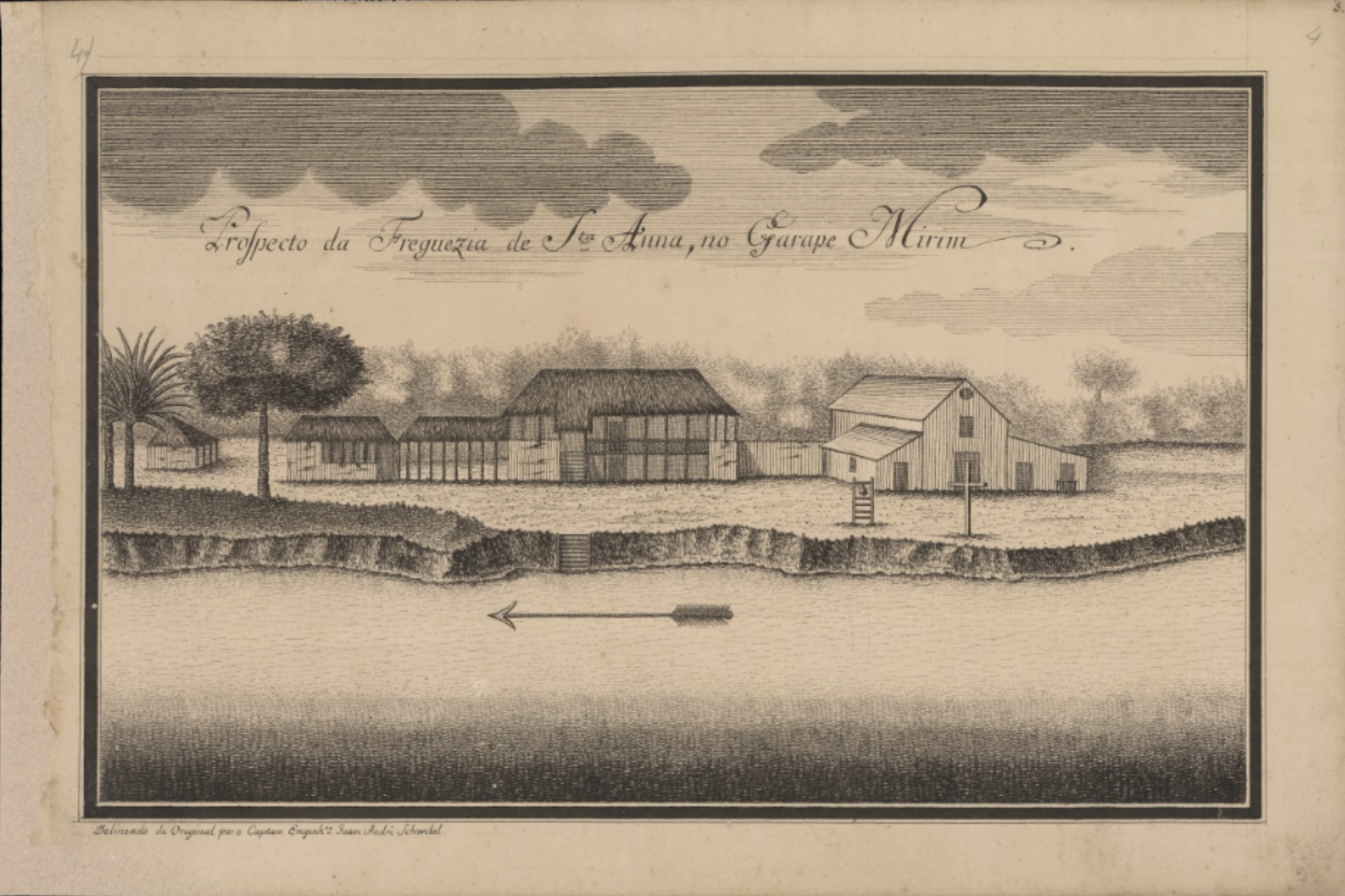
View of the Parish of Igarapé-Mirim. In the Collection from the prospects of the villages, and more remarkable places that are found on the map that the engineers created on expedition starting from the city of Pará to the village of Mariua in the Rio Negro, 1756. Drawing in Indian ink by João André (Johann Andreas) Schwebel. Collection of the Biblioteca Nacional do Brasil.

The first visit was to the royal estate on the Rio Moju where timber was produced and canoes were made. The party stayed there to allow time for new canoes to be sent to Belém and the first visit to a sugar mill took place. The journey then continued to Igarapé-Miri (or Mirim) on the river of the same name. This was the fifth day of the journey, and once there Bishop Bulhões celebrated Mass in the parish church and then departed to return to Belém.

Mendonça Furtado's first negative interaction with the Jesuits on this journey occurred on day eleven at the aldeia of Guaricurú, by report one of the largest. On arrival they found it deserted except for a priest, three old Indians, some boys and a few Indian women who were related to the Indians on the governor's crew.

The diary includes a parenthesized note saying, "the first manifestation of resistance or hostility by the priests of the Society of Jesus against the fulfilment of the Preliminary Limitations Treaty, signed in Madrid on 13 January 1750." Although this is in the writer's hand, it might well represent an opinion expressed by the governor himself.

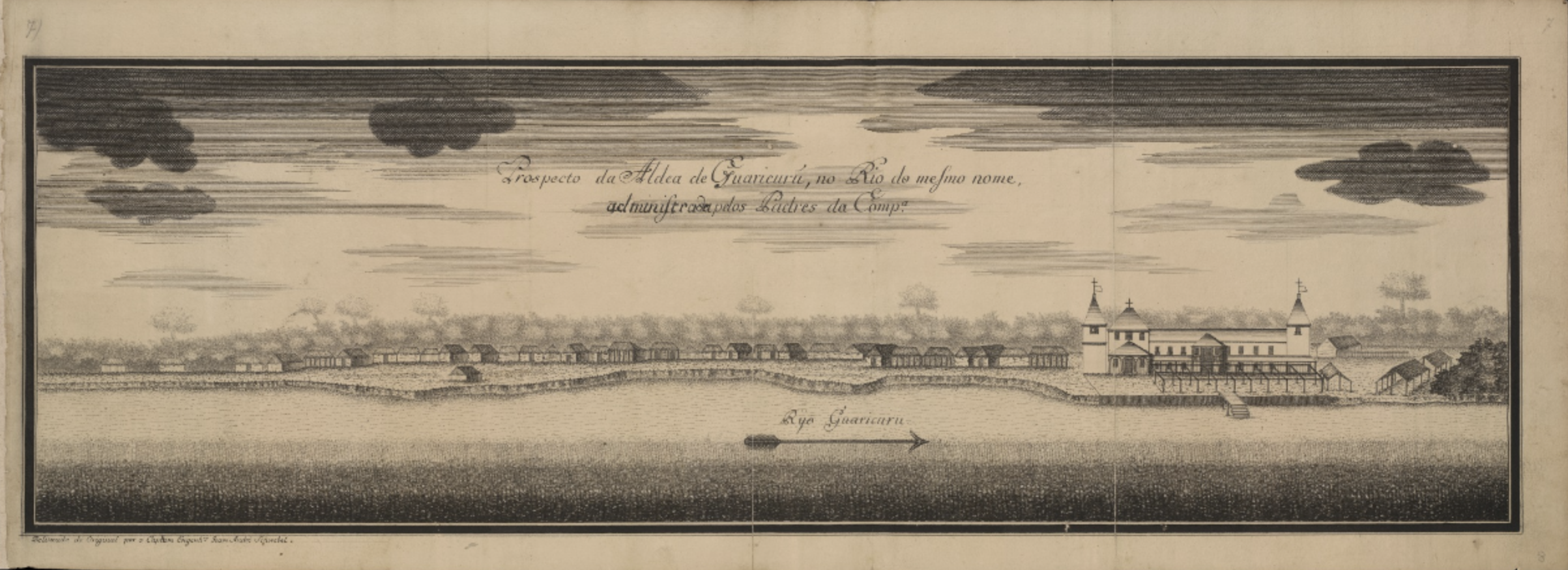
View of the Aldeia of Guaricurú. In the Collection from the prospects of the villages, and more remarkable places that are found on the map that the engineers created on expedition starting from the city of Pará to the village of Mariua in the Rio Negro, 1756. Drawing in Indian ink by João André (Johann Andreas) Schwebel. Collection of the Biblioteca Nacional do Brasil.

Guaricurú was one place in which the governor had requested flour to be kept for his collection. However, those in the aldeia seemed to know nothing about this, and after a search was made the flour was located in the priests' house. With labour required to load the flour onto the canoes and with repairing faulty canoe ropes, the next day the governor sent soldiers into the surrounding area to search for the Indians. But only a few appeared and "confessed that everyone had fled because of the practice and instruction the priest had given them." Mendonça Furtado later reported this along with insolent behaviour by the priest and other observations in a letter to Bishop Bulhões.

From there the party proceeded to the next aldeia at Arucará (later renamed by Mendonça Furtado as Portel) which was abandoned except for the Indian chief and a few of his people. Because he wanted to add extra Indians to his crew in case more deserted already deserted, Mendonça Furtado noted the chief's unwillingness either to help or obey his orders.

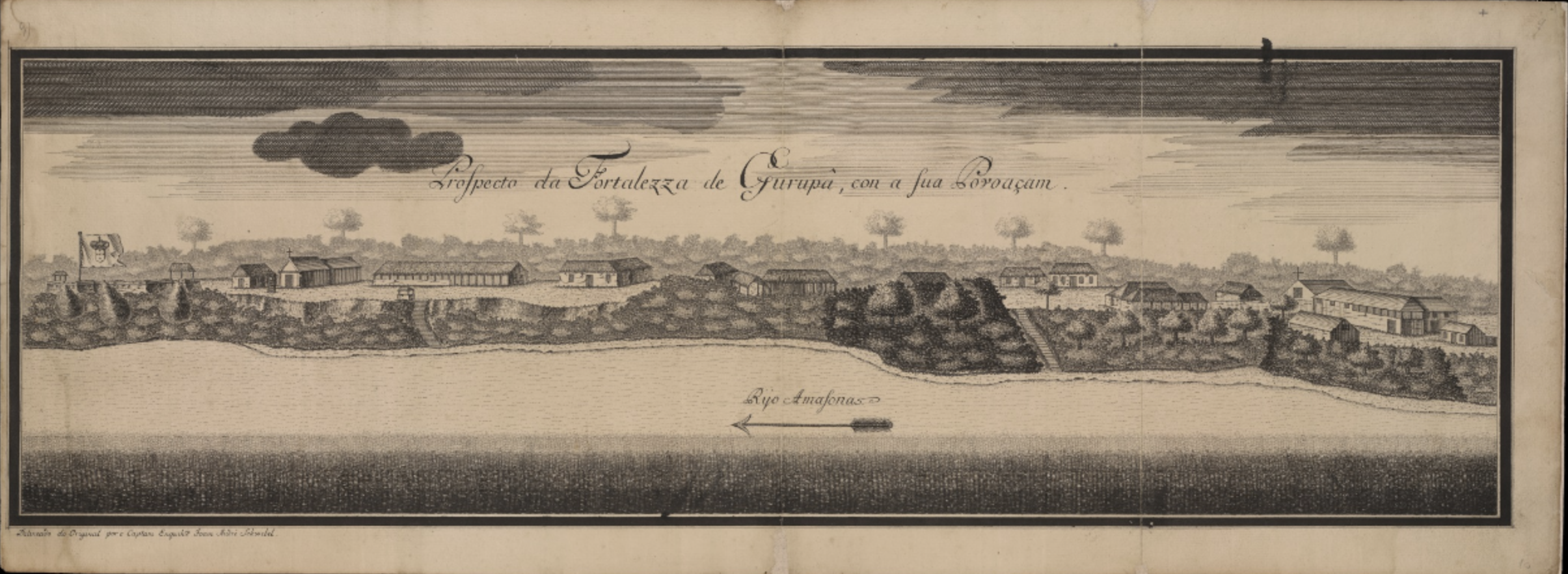
View of the Fortaleza of Garupá. In the Collection from the prospects of the villages, and more remarkable places that are found on the map that the engineers created on expedition starting from the city of Pará to the village of Mariua in the Rio Negro, 1756. Drawing in Indian ink by João André (Johann Andreas) Schwebel. Collection of the Biblioteca Nacional do Brasil.

Four days on from Arucará the party arrived at the fort of Gurupá where the governor was greeted with a military salute. They remained there for three days so they could rest and rebuild supplies, and Mendonça Furtado entertained the officers and all his entourage except the Indians at the table. Noting the poor state of the church when Mass was celebrated there, the governor gave a large sum of money for use in its renovation. He also had money distributed among the soldiers. Flour and dried fish was collected for later use. On return to the canoes to set sail it was discovered that 16 more Indians had deserted. This meant that by their next stop, the total was 36 and voyage diartist Silva noted that the majority had come onto the voyage from aldeias which he took as confirming his opinion about the role the Jesuits had played in turning their minds against the governor.

Several more days included visits to aldeias being run by the Capuchins where their welcome contrasted strongly with the response they had received in Jesuit settlements, and likewise, flour and other supplies were also readily available. As an example of Capuchin hospitality, at Arapijó the governor was welcomed to the table and his entourage was offered gifts of bananas by the Indians. In return he gave then ribbons, knives, cloth and salt. Silva noted this aldeia as being very poor and swarmed with mosquitoes (Brazilian Portuguese derived from Tupi: carapanã, denoting a mosquito which is now recognised as a transmitter of dengue fever and malaria) "so that at night we were very mortified."

The remainder of the trip to Mariuá included visits to aldeias, enghenos and plantations, with nothing new to reveal except that Indian desertion continued so that by the time of the journey's conclusion 165 Indians had deserted during the journey. This constant recurrence of Indian desertion and his difficulty finding others to replace them preoccupied Mendonça Furtado's correspondence with Bishop Bulhões and others.

Apart from the delays this was causing in his journey, he also dwelt on how, without the guaranteed involvement of Indians he was going to be able to care adequately for his household and guests, including the Spanish commissioners he was expecting to see once the journey was completed.

This ongoing experience had reshaped his attitude towards the Indians in whom he had wrongly assumed he would see a willingness to work, but had actually observed the opposite. As a reading of his correspondence suggests, although his criticism of the Indians increased, from a European perspective, he seemed unable to comprehend how they were part of a historical-ethnic-societal structure in which habits, values and beliefs were very different from those held in societies from which he and other colonists had emerged. In any case, he continued to project the blame for their behaviour onto the Jesuits who he judged as having failed to develop civilized behaviour among the Indians, and equally seriously, had turned them against loyalty to the Portuguese empire and its crown.

==== Stay in Mariuá ====
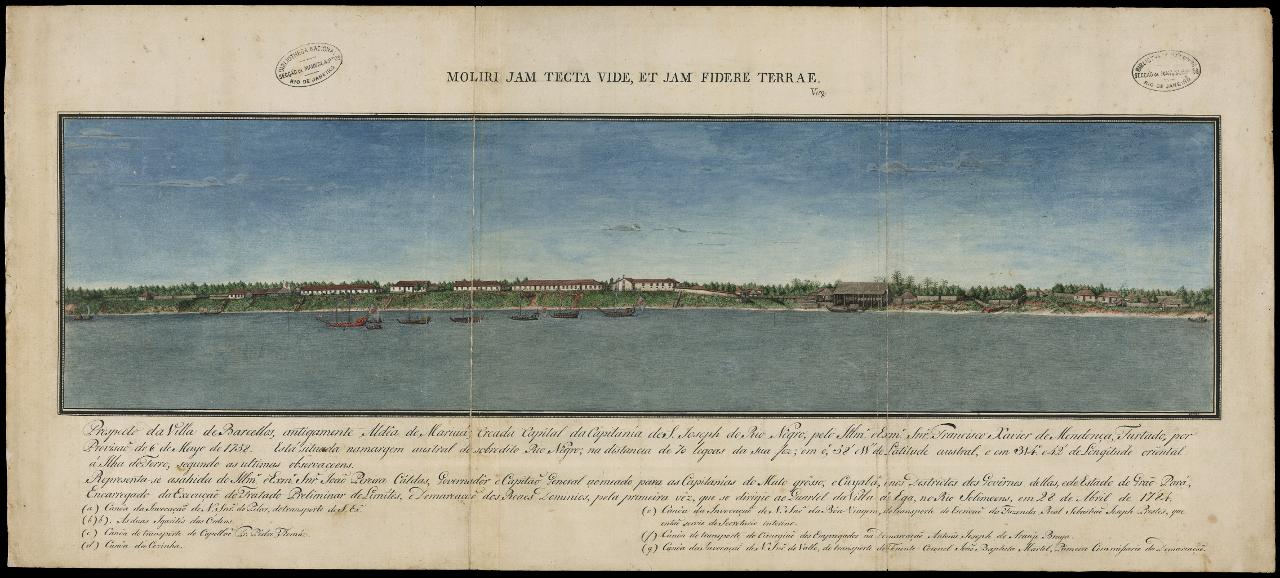
View of the village of Barcelos, formerly Aldeia de Mariuá, created capital of the captaincy of S. José do Rio Negro, by Ilmº and Exmº Francisco Xavier de Mendonça Furtado, by a declaration of May 6, 1758. Scientific expedition of Alexandre Rodrigues Ferreira (1756–1815). Drawing by José Joaquim Freire (1760–1847). Published in 1784. Collection of the Biblioteca Nacional do Brasil.

In December 1754 the journey ended at Mariuá (now known as Barcelos) on the Rio Negro a distance upstream from its mouth with the Amazon. Colonial use of the site had already begun in 1729 when the Carmelites set up the aldeia of Mariuá (also known as the Missão de Nossa Senhora da Conceição de Mariuá) as a mission to the Manaus, Baré, Pariana, Uiraquena and Passé Indians.

By the time of Mendonça Furtado's journey, it had been designated as the place where he and Spain's plenipotentiary, José Iturriaga would meet so they could begin their demarcation of the northern borders. To ensure that conditions were suitable for himself and his party he had already sent ahead military officer Gabriel de Sousa Filgueiras whose praise he declared when writing to his brother because on arrival he found barracks erected and plantations of manioc (cassava) and maize well advanced.

Accommodation for himself was a problem, though, the solution being that he "had no other remedy than to enter the house of residence of the priests which they call the Hospice"; and for the Spanish team "to make decent and comfortable quarters". So, while awaiting Iturriaga's arrival, Mendonça Furtado had his team undertake extensive work including the laying out of streets and the erection of buildings and bridges. Also in 1755 he had a military battery constructed to provide defence for the settlement.

===== Border demarcation =====
By the end of 1755 Mendonça Furtado had been in Mariuá for a full year and as reports to Lisbon indicate, he and his team gathered information the surrounding territory. For example, a quite early document entitled Relação dos rios que deságuam no Rio Negro, de que até agora tenho achado na primeira parte do nascente, ou da mão direita (Relation of the rivers that flow into the Rio Negro, that I have found so far in the first part of the river, or on the right hand) which listed 59 rivers using names that were being used at that time, many of which have since been changed. Other information includes geographical features and comments about Indian tribes some of whom are listed as extinct.

There is also an appendix document entitled Notícia do Rio Branco: Que me deu Francisco Ferreira, homem de mais de oitenta anos, que tem mais de cinqüenta de navegação do dito rio e mas participou em Mariuá, em 29 de março de 1755 (Information on the Rio Branca: Which Francisco Ferreira, a man of more than eighty years, who has more than fifty of navigation of the said river gave to me by imparting it in Mariuá, 29 of March 1755). Here ten tributaries of the Rio Branca are listed, the name of the last being unknown.

By 8 July of that same year, Mendonça Furtado's reports were dealing more specifically with the question of demarcations. He begins the covering letter with the following:

"I am sending you the plan that I have made for the demarcations of the royal domains of His Majesty, which I formed after making all the inquiries I could contact and, understanding that if we do so in this way, we will derive from them the advantages that may be possible, according to the terms of the Treaty of January 13, 1750, and new information promised to me by the governor of Mato Grosso in the letter of which I send you a copy, see if it is necessary to change anything. The said plan is for you to present to His Majesty so that, when it is served, see if he has given you royal approval or if I should change anything in it."

The attached document, Sistema das demarcações da parte do norte (Demarmarcation system of the northern region) has three sections each dealing with a different portion of the region, providing geographical analyses, especially in reference to the demarcation criteria spelt out in the Treaty of Madrid document, implications of the required border markings with reference to military security and mobility, and the possible loss of resources to Spain.

For example, the first section, Quanto ao Rio Negro (Regarding the Rio Negro) warns in Par. 1 that if Art. 9 of the Treaty of Madrid were applied the area between the Rios Japurá and Negro would pass into Spain's control thereby blocking paths of communication between Portuguese settlers on the banks of both rivers. Mendonça Furtado also demonstrated how he had Portugal's economic benefits in mind by noting that around the Rio Negro upstream there was an extensive area "in which there are infinite and important rivers full of people, which can be very useful to us, there being in some of them, besides the people, the news that there is gold, the most important being the Cojari, which they commonly call Guaupis, from which, in fact, some evidence of gold has appeared in the hands of the Gentiles [ie Indians] who inhabit it."

The detail with which Mendonça Furtado analyses the demarcation issues in the third section, Quanto ao Jauru até o Guaporé (Regarding the Jauru up to the Guaporé), suggests that this area is of particular importance to him. The fact that the outcomes of any negotiation about the placements of the borders here will affect Portugal's benefits from the rich and fertile Mato Grosso, already being gained through extensive land ownership by Portuguese settlers, leads him to say that the demarcations proposed under the Treaty of Madrid are impractical and should be changed under Arts. 3 and 7 of the Treaty. By doing so, he says three things will be saved: "All the navigation of the Jauru River, which is exclusive to us; the path that the Portuguese have made and use from Mato Grosso to Cuiabá; and that part which the Portuguese themselves have occupied in the district of the above-mentioned Mato Grosso, and for the most part we are deprived, if the line is drawn in the form stated in said art. 7 and the map approved by the Courts."

The records show at the end of this document a note, "Lisbon, 13 November 1755", implying that it had arrived there at approximately the same time as the Lisbon earthquake occurred. Therefore, it would receive little if any attention. In any case, the Treaty of Madrid's disintegration, in which Carvalho e Melo played a significant role, meant that resolutions had been achieved until the First Treaty of San Ildefonso was signed in 1777, and it was not until 1798 that orders were given in Portugal by the Secretary of State for the Navy and Overseas Territories for a comprehensive chart of Brazil to be drawn up based on existing and new research. The result was 86 charts employing conventional cartographic markings and detailed indications of all landmarks, forts, captaincies, paths, gold and iron mines, waterfalls and abandoned sites.

===== Expansion, administration and commercial development =====
But the question was how to provide adequate population in the colony? His solution was well described in Carvalho e Melo's secret correspondence with the Governor of the State of Brazil, Gomes Freire de Andrade: "As the wealth of all countries consist principally in the number and multiplication of the people that inhabit it, this number and multiplication is most indispensable now on the frontiers of Brazil for their defense." But because he could not see it as possible to move people from the major urban centres or to migrate them from elsewhere in the Atlantic colonies, his solution was to abolish "all differences between Indians and Portuguese", to induce Indians to relocate from the mission in the Banda Oriental and to promote intermarriage between the races.

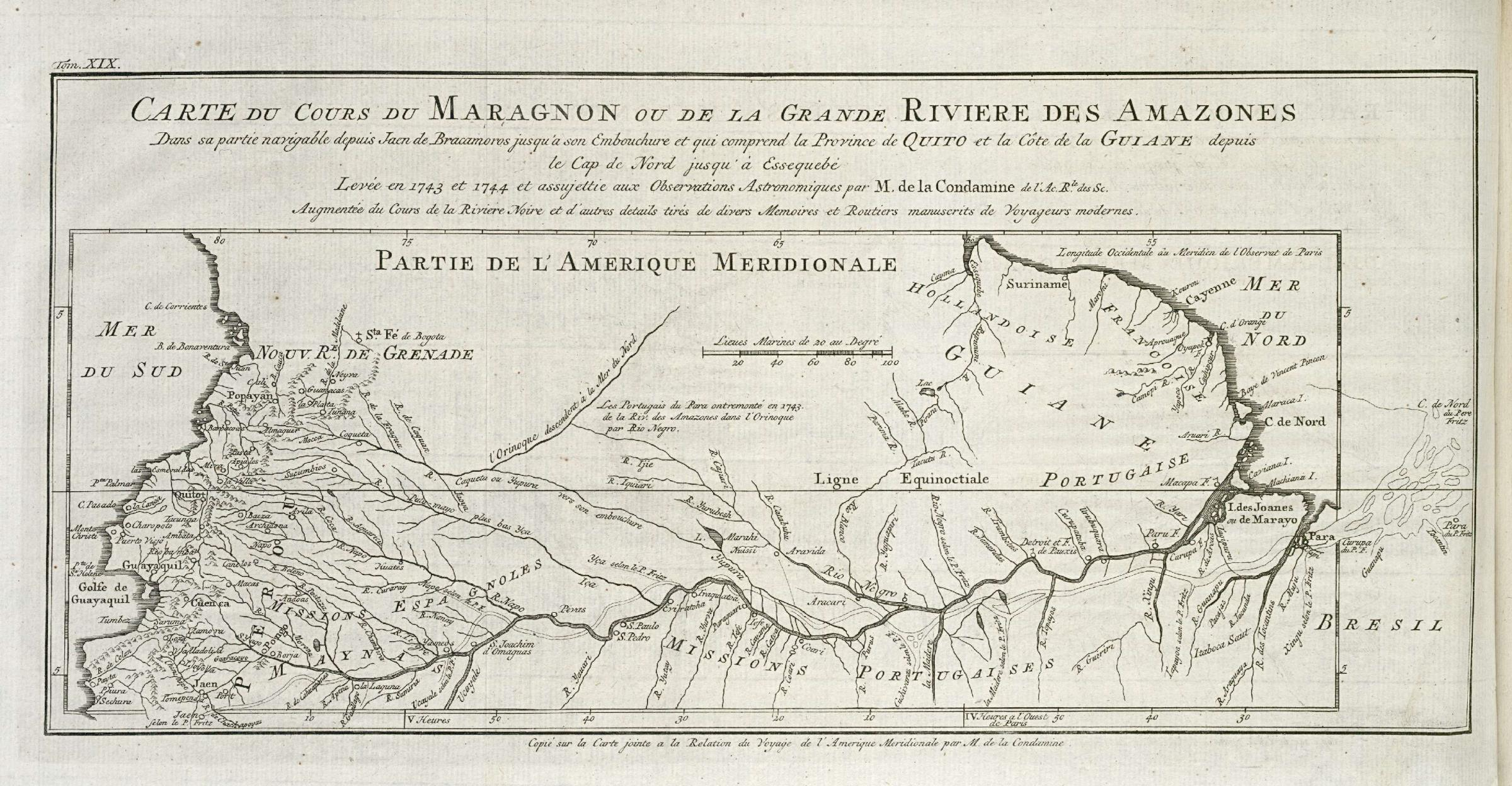
Map of the course of the Amazon. (Carte du Cours du Maragnon ou de la Grande Riviere des Amazones. Dans sa partie navigable depuis Jaén de Bracamoros jusqu'a son Embouchure te qui comprend la Province de Quito et la Côte de la Guiane depuis le Cap de Nord jusqu'à Essequebé.) Map by Charles Marie de La Condamine based on his journey in 1743–1744. Engraving on paper by Guillaume-Nicolas Delahaye, 1772.

Even before Mendonça Furtado's appointment as governor, his brother had already written to the Governor of Brazil expressing the need for the population in Brazil's interior to expand both for the security of the colony and for its economic development. This correspondence was sent soon after the death of King João V by the end of whose reign, population growth in the Amazon basin had been minimal and, as one analyst reports, there were "only eleven municipalities: the cities of Belém and São Luís and the towns of Cayeté (Bragança), Cametá (Vila Viçosa), Gurupá, Gurupy (Vila Nova d'El-Rei), Vigia, Icatu, Vila da Mocha, Parnaguá and Parnaíba."

With Carvalho e Melo's commitment to population expansion in place and with his brother having received on appointment the Instruções Régias which sought the same, it is not surprising that this happened at increasing pace from early in Mendonça Furtado's governance to the end of the century.

=== Observations of the Indians ===
As already noted above (See Indigenous peoples, slavery and Jesuit involvement), the Catholic Church's focus on the conversion of American Indians began in the mid-16th century and various religious orders sent members to the Americas to undertake this work. In South America's Spanish colonies, and later in those of Portugal, the Jesuits became the most active and influential order, partly because of their favoured relationship with the papacy, and more because of their close relationships with the Spanish and Portuguese royal families.

But despite the church's noble aspirations as set forth in Pope Paul III's encyclical, and the endorsement given to it by the Spanish and Portuguese monarchs, by the time Mendonça Furtado took up office as governor the Amazonian region had already been through more than a century of conflict between three distinct parties, the donatorios and settlers, the church, and the Indians.

"While stationed at a village deep in the heart of the Amazon [that is, Mariuá] for nearly two years waiting for the arrival of the Spanish delegation, Furtado had ample opportunity to visit various aldeias and observe the relationship 12 among the missionaries, Indians, and settlers. His reliance on Indians as guides and laborers on his trip dampened his optimistic opinion of their potential, and led him to suggest a more reserved version as well as the delayed implementation of a set of reforms established by Pombal in Lisbon based on Furtado's recommendations."

=== Expulsion of the Jesuits ===
As dealt with above, Carvalho e Melo's dissatisfaction with the Jesuits, as much related to their influence within the Portuguese court as their controlling influence in Brazil, is stated clearly in the Instruções Régias, At the early stage of Mendonça Furtado's governorship, the idea of expelling the Jesuits was not yet on the agenda. However, they were not off the hook because in the instructions he had been directed to investigate the Jesuits' wealth and landholding "with great caution, circumspection, and prudence".

As early as one month after his arrival, in a private letter to his brother, Mendonça Furtado expressed invective against the Jesuits. Their exploitative relationship with the Indians had become clear to him, and commenting about what he had seen in the aldeias he used phrases such as "neither justice nor King are there known", "the natives have not been converted…they are taught a vernacular that they call the lingua geral ("Common language", a reference to Tupi, the 'hybrid' language which the Jesuits had created as a standard language for use with all Indians)...they spend most of their time practicing their own rituals and are lightly instructed in the mysteries of the saintly faith", and that they had "usurped" power over the Indians which had never been formally granted to them.

In other words, apart from their subjection of Indians either to slavery or some other form of compulsive labour by which they had ignored repeated instructions from the monarch; they had exercised their own power independently and even in defiance of the throne, and in contradiction to the concept of royal patronage under which they had been asked originally by King João III to begin their work in Brazil in 1549 for the mutual benefit of state and church. But in view of Carvalho e Melo's desire to rebuild Portugal's economy, the fact that the Jesuits had taken hold of agriculture and commerce with no benefits flowing back to the empire might well have been his greatest motivator.

== Death ==
Mendonça Furtado died suddenly on 15 November 1769 when the court was at the Braganza family's Ducal Palace of Vila Viçosa.

Reasons for his death are unclear. In the editor's footnote to the Anecdotes du ministère de Sébastien-Joseph Carvalho the following is given:

"He (ie Mendonça Furtado) was suddenly carried away in 1769 by an abscess which was ready to burst. He had to be buried on the spot, because of the horrible odour that the corpse emitted immediately."

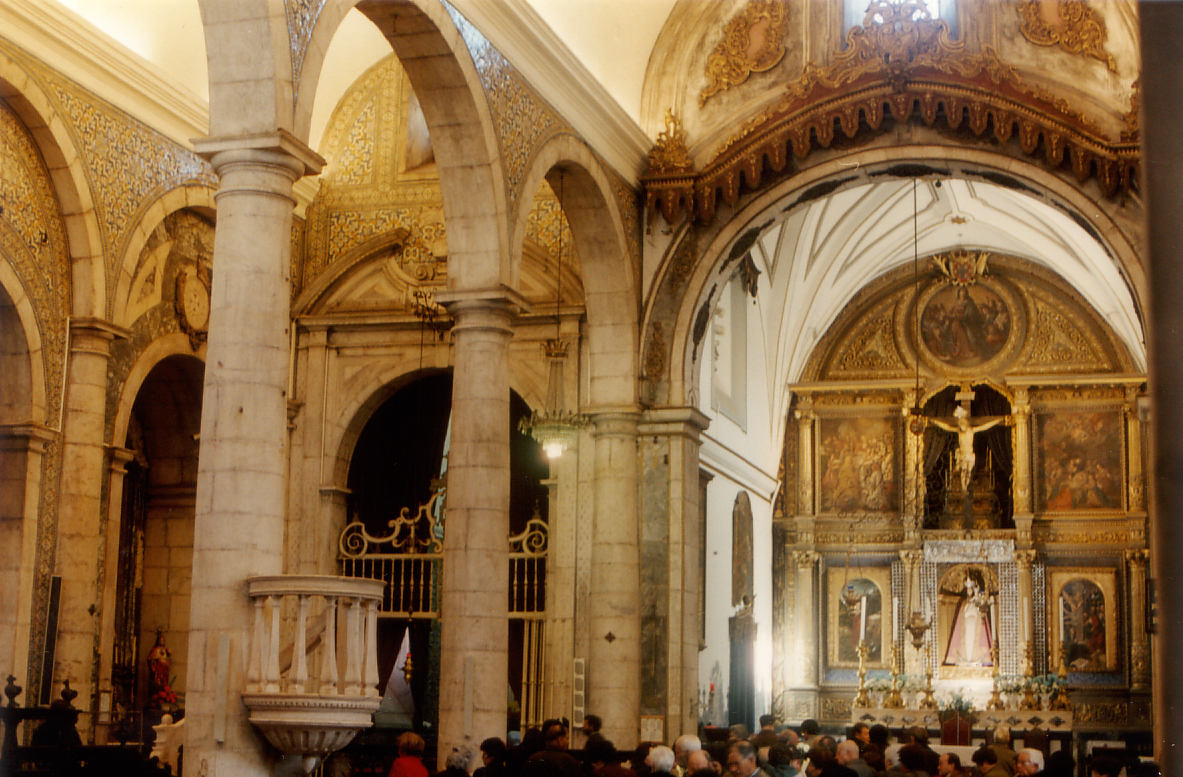
Interior of the Sanctuary of Our Lady of the Conception of Vila Viçosa with the High Altar and Shrine of Our Lady of the Conception, Patron of Portugal to the right, and to the left the Chapel of the Blessed Sacrament, formerly the location of Mendonça Furtado's tomb.

By contrast, the Mémoires du Sébastien-Joseph Carvalho e Melo vary on this point, saying that Carvalho e Melo had allowed himself to take the young Prince of Beira to spend a few days at Oeiras while the court was at Vila Viçosa; that Queen Mariana Victoria, so distressed by this audacity, that having met his brother Mendonça Furtado, "crushed him with the harshest reproaches, and made him bear all the weight of her resentment. Mendonça in despair, retired to his apartment, where he was seized with a fever so violent, that it took him away after three days."

Neither story can be verified from independent first-hand reports, and both have elements that sound fanciful. Considering that the first is attributed to a "champion of the Jesuit society" (Portuguese: paladino da sociedade jesuitica), which could have been the queen or a number of other members of the nobility and aristocracy who were strongly critical of what Carvalho e Melo and his brother had carried against the Jesuits, references to phenomena such as foul body odours or the queen's rage being enough to kill a man could be read as attempts to pour scorn on the two brothers.

As indicated above, Mendonça Furtado had to be buried quickly. This took place on the same day of his death and his tomb is located in the Capela do Sanctíssimo Sacramento (Chapel of the Blessed Sacrament) to the left of High Altar of the Igreja Matriz de Vila Viçosa (Mother Church of Vila Viçosa, i.e. the Santuário de Nossa Sra. da Conceição). Due to restoration work carried out in 1940, his tombstone and those of others buried there were removed and their bones were placed together in a wooden box and deposited in an unmarked site.

== Assessment of Mendonça Furtado ==
Comments about Mendonça Furtado by his contemporaries and later commentators provide deeply contrasting, even conflicting, descriptions of his personality, behaviour and suitability for high office. Some sing his praise; others decry him as being bullish, short-tongued and even unstable. Overall, the reader is left with questions about his personal suitability for high office or whether his elevation came about only because of the power and influence of his brother, Carvalho e Melo.

Santos, for example, quotes praise offered by Mendonça Furtado's colonial colleagues on his departure from Brazil.

The first came from Miguel de Bulhões e Sousa, Bishop of Belém do Pará who wrote to Carvalho e Melo in February 1759 saying that he "had never known he would experience the cruelty of this blow (ie Mendonça Furtado's departure from Brazil)", continuing "this whole state cries and will weep forever the absence of this illustrious Conqueror and Restorer."

In similar fashion, Pará's royal magistrate Feliciano Ramos Nobre Mourão told Carvalho e Melo that his brother was "gloriously leaving his name memorable for all ages, for his heroic deeds and enlightened virtues" offering as evidence the way he had promoted the liberty of the Indians, protected the inhabitants, encouraged commerce, increased incomes from livestock and the production of various kinds, all thanks to his "exemplary procedure, honesty, ardent zeal."

Cruz took a more balanced approach:

"The sources describe him as a fair man, but choleric and untimely, attributes that were far from being recommended in a colonial administrator but did not prevent his appointment to the government of the State of Grão-Pará and Maranhão in April 1751. The intervention of his brother, who was beginning to gain ascendancy with Don Jose, would have been decisive."

João Lúcio de Azevedo, who assessed Mendonça Furtado's career in Brazil more than a century after his death, also painted a complex picture: "energetic by nature, like the prime minister his brother; rude by habit acquired in the training of the maritime profession; haughty for his position as governor, not speaking in kinship with the arbitrator of the empire's destiny; arrogant through necessity in the captaincy." By contrast, though, he was keen to show that this man should be assessed quite separately of his brother, as shown when he wrote:

"It is known that the great Marquis had several spokesmen, and one of these … was his brother Francisco Xavier de Mendonça Furtado, first governor of Gram-Pará, and later Minister of the Navy. It was this last misjudged by history, which has said little of his merits. The admirers of Carvalho, hypnotized in the contemplation of their idol, do not distinguish the secondary figures, that surround him; the adversaries include in the same systematic condemnation the minister and the collaborators who were retained by him."

As Azevedo illustrated, there were various opinions about Mendonça Furtado. "Of the modern writers, Francisco Luíz Gomes, perhaps the most appreciative of the events of the time, claims Francisco Xavier to have been a man of little understanding; an unfair view … ."

Another example, given by Azevedo, was of Simão José da Luz Soriano, the Portuguese government's official historian, who, dealing with the Jesuits' appeal to the court against the way Mendonça Furtado was dealing with them, recorded how they had:

"… represented his bad qualities to the court, and above all, painted him, as he really was, a man who was essentially coarse and despotic, qualities, with others, which rendered him altogether incapable of governing men, whom he vexed and oppressed in unbearable ways. Both complaints were true, both those of the Jesuits against Mendonça, and those of this governor against the Jesuits."

In the end, it emerges clearly that Azevedo was prepared to argue in Mendonça Furtado's favour because, as he wrote:

"Appointed captain-general of the Gram-Pará soon after his brother had entered the ministry, Mendonça had been in charge of the government for more than seven years leaving in the archives of the captaincy enough evidence to illustrate that we may be misinformed by those who have haggled against him with limited intellectual endowment.

Even in modern historical research, a bleak image of Mendonça Furtado has continued to come forward. For example, Bourbon e Menezes and Gustavo de Matos Sequeira's Figuras históricas de Portugal (Historic Figures of Portugal) published in 1933 included their portrayal:

"… He was a duplication in inferior material of the illustrious brother [ie Carvalho e Melo], a tentacle by which [the brother] extended to where he could not come, an alter-ego, like so many that Pombal had, with the disadvantage of the same blood having to boil in a head of less weight."

Similarly, another modern scholar, Alden has described him as:

"A one-time naval officer, Mendonça Furtado was imperious, hard-driving, crude, violent tempered, ambitious though completely loyal to his elder brother, pious in an Old Testament sense, gullible but suspicious of the motives of anyone, particularly one whom he regarded as inferior, who held views contrary to his own; he was therefore entirely uncompromising."

=== Bibliography ===
- Abreu, Capistrano (2009). Capítulos da história colonial. doi:10.7476/9788579820717. ISBN 978-85-7982-071-7.
- Alden, Dauril. "Andrade, Gomes Freire de (1688–1763)." Encyclopedia of Latin American History and Culture. Encyclopedia.com. (in English). Accessed 7 February 2019.
- ___. "Economic Aspects of the Expulsion of the Jesuits from Brazil: A Preliminary Report." Conflict and Continuity in Brazilian Society. Edited by Henry E Keith and S F Edwards. University of South Carolina Press, 1969. pp. 25–71 (in English). ISBN 0-87249-170-6.
- ___. The Making of an Enterprise: The Society of Jesus in Portugal, Its Empire, and Beyond, 1540-1750. Stanford University Press, 1996. (in English). ISBN 0-8047-2271-4.
- Alveal, Carmen (2014). "Capitania-donataria". E-Dicionário da Terra e do Território no Império Português. doi:10.15847/cehc.edittip.2014v011.
- Alveal, Carmen (2014). "Capitania real". E-Dicionário da Terra e do Território no Império Português. doi:10.15847/cehc.edittip.2014v012.
- Serrão, José Vicente (2016). "Tipos de capitanias". E-Dicionário da Terra e do Território no Império Português. 4. doi:10.15847/cehc.edittip.2016v007.
- Alveal, Carmen (2014). "Donatários". E-Dicionário da Terra e do Território no Império Português. doi:10.15847/cehc.edittip.2014v021.
- Azevedo, João Lúcio de. Estudos de história paraense (Study of Pará's history). Tavares Cardoso & Co, 1893. (in Portuguese). Accessed 10 January 2019.
- Biblioteca Nacional de Portugal, Coleção Pombalina. Instruções Régias, Públicas e Secretas para Francisco Xavier de Mendonça Furtado, Capitão-General do Estado do Grāo-Pará e Maranhão (Public and Secret Royal Instructions for Francisco Xavier de Mendonça Furtado, Captain-General of the State of Grâo-Pará and Maranhão). Inventário dos Manuscritos (seção XIII) da Coleção Pombalina da Biblioteca Nacional de Lisboa, publicado em Lisboa, 1891, encontra-se a seguinte indicação no Codice 626: "Instruções régias, públicas e secretas para F. X. M. F., Governador do Maranhão e Grão-Pará, sobre administração, missões e índios, repressão do poder eclesiástico, doutrinas pregadas pelos jesuítas, representação do P. Malagrida, privilégios do Maranhão – 1751. (in Portuguese).
- Biblioteca Virtual Miguel de Cervantes. Tratado firmado en Madrid, 13 de enero de 1750, para determinar los límites de los estados pertenecientes a las coronas de España y Portugal, en Asia y América (Treaty signed in Madrid, January 13, 1750, to determine the limits of the states belonging to the crowns of Spain and Portugal, in Asia and America). Imprenta del Estados, Buenos Aires, 1836. Online at the Biblioteca Virtual Miguel de Cervantes (in Spanish). Accessed 14 February 2019.
- Block, David. Mission Culture on the Upper Amazon: Native Tradition, Jesuit Enterprise and Secular Policy in Moxos, 1660-1880. University of Nebraska Press, 1994. Online with eCommons, University of Cornell. (in English). Accessed 7 February 2019. ISBN 978-0-8032-1232-9.
- Bourbon e Menezes, Alfonso Augusto Falcão Cotta de and Gustavo Adriano de Matos Sequeira Figuras históricas de Portugal (Historic Figures of Portugal). Livraria Lello & Irmão, 1933. (in Portuguese).
- Brás, José Gregório; Gonçalves, Maria Neves; Robert, André (22 February 2018). "The Jesuits in Portugal: the communion of science and religion". Social and Education History. 7 (1): 1. doi:10.17583/hse.2018.2910.
- Carrara, Angelo Alves (2014). "The population of Brazil, 1570-1700: a historiographical review". Tempo. 20. doi:10.1590/TEM-1980-542X-2014203619eng.
- Carvalho, Benjamin de. (2015) “The modern roots of feudal empires: The donatary captaincies and the legacies of the Portuguese Empire in modern Brazil.” Chapter 6 in Sandra Halperin and Ronen Palan (eds.) Legacies of Empire: Imperial Roots of the Contemporary Global Order. (Edited by Sandra Halperin and Ronen Palan. Cambridge University Press). Chapter 6, pp. 128–148. Available online at . Accessed 6 January 2024.
- Chambouleyron, Rafael. "Indian Freedom and Indian Slavery in the Portuguese Amazon (1640–1755). Building the Atlantic Empires: Unfree Labour and Imperial States in the Political Economy of Capitalism, ca. 1500–1914. Edited by John Donoghue and Evelyn P. Jennings. Brill, 2016. pp. 54–71. (in English). ISBN 90-04-28519-9.
- Chambouleyron, Rafael (14 May 2006). "Plantações, sesmarias e vilas.Uma reflexão sobre a ocupação da Amazônia seiscentista". Nuevo Mundo Mundos Nuevos. doi:10.4000/nuevomundo.2260.
- Chambouleyron, Rafael; Barbosa, Benedito Costa; Bombardi, Fernanda Aires; Sousa, Claudia Rocha de (December 2011). "'Formidável contágio': epidemias, trabalho e recrutamento na Amazônia colonial (1660-1750)" ['Formidable contagion': epidemics, work and recruitment in the colonial Amazon (1660-1750)]. História, Ciências, Saúde-Manguinhos (in Portuguese). 18 (4): 987–1004. doi:10.1590/S0104-59702011000400002. PMID 22281955.
- Colonial Roots of Modern Brazil: Papers of the Newberry Library Conference. Edited by Dauril Alden. University of California Press, 1973. (in English). ISBN 0-520-02140-1.
- Cruz, Miguel Dantas da (2015). "Francisco Xavier de Mendonça Furtado (1701-1769)". E-Dicionário da Terra e do Território no Império Português. doi:10.15847/cehc.edittip.2015v003 (inactive 5 January 2026). hdl:10451/22469.
- Cruz, Miguel Dantas da (2014). "Pombal and the Atlantic Empire: political impacts of the foundation of the Royal Treasury". Tempo. 20: 1–24. doi:10.1590/TEM-1980-542X-2014203621eng.
- Duarte, Helena Nunes. ""Civilizing" the Amazon: Amerindians and the Portuguese Crown's Struggle for Sovereignty, 1650-1777". Journal of the Canadian Historical Association, Vol. 18/2, 2007. The Canadian Historical Association / La Société historique du Canada. Uploaded by Érudit. (in English). Accessed 8 February 2019. ISSN 1712-6274.
- Falola, Toyin and Kevin David Roberts, eds. The Atlantic World, 1450-2000. Indiana University Press, 2008. (in English). ISBN 0-253-34970-2.
- Finkelman, Paul and Seymour Drescher. "The Eternal Problem of Slavery in International Law: Killing the Vampire of Human Culture." Michigan State Law Review. Vol. 2017, Issue 4. (in English). Accessed 31 January 2019. ISSN 1087-5468.
- Franco, Justin Henry. The Role of Mapping in the Formation of South America's Political Boundaries and Territorial Disputes. Paper from the 30th National Conference on Undergraduate Research, University of North Carolina, 7–9 April 2016. pp. 499–509. (in English). Accessed 3 February 2019.
- Gomes, Francisco Luis. Le marquis de Pombal, esquisse de sa vie publique (The Marquis of Pombal, sketch of his public life). Imprimerie Franco-Portugaise, 1869. (in French). Accessed 18 January 2019.
- Gusta, Francesco. Anecdotes du ministère de Sébastien-Joseph Carvalho, Comte d'Oyeras, Marquis de Pombal, sous le règne de Joseph I, roi de Portugal, nouvelle édition. Varsovie: Janosrowicki, 1784. pp. 325–326 [n a]. (in French). Accessed 13 January 2019.
- ___. Mémoires du Sébastien-Joseph Carvalho e Melo, Comte d'Oyeras, Marquis de Pombal, Secrétaire d'Etat et Premier Ministre du Roi de Portugal Joseph I. Vol. 3. 1784. pp. 144–145. (in French). Accessed 13 January 2019.
- Harris, Mark. Rebellion on the Amazon: The Cabanagem, Race, and Popular Culture in the North of Brazil, 1798-1840. Cambridge University Press, 2010. (in English). ISBN 0-521-43723-7.
- Harrisse, Henry (1897), The Diplomatic History of America: Its First Chapter 1452—1493—1494, London: Stevens.
- Hemming, John. Red Gold: The conquest of the Brazilian Indians. Harvard University Press, 1978. (in English). Available online at . Accessed 22 December 2019. ISBN 0-674-75107-8.
- Langfur, Hal, ed.. Native Brazil: Beyond the Convert and the Cannibal, 1500 – 1889. University of New Mexico Press, 2014. Uploaded by Academia.edu. (in English). Accessed 24 January 2019.
- Loureiro, Antônio José Souto. A Amazônia e o quinto império (The Amazon and the Fifth Empire). Academia Amazonense de Letras, 2011. Published online by Biblioteca Virtual do Amazonas, 8 August 2017. (in Portuguese). Accessed 5 March 2019. ISBN 85-64341-06-9.
- McAlister, Lyle N. Spain and Portugal in the New World, 1492–1700. University of Minnesota Press, 1984. (in English). ISBN 0-8166-1218-8.
- McGinness, Anne B. "The Historiography of the Jesuits in Brazil Prior to the Suppression." Jesuit Historiography Online. Edited by Robert A. Maryks. BrillOnline Reference Works, July 2018. (in English). Accessed 21 January 2019. ISSN 2468-7723
- McKeown, Marie. "Indigenous People of Latin America: An Introduction." Published online by Owlcation (in English). Accessed 16 March 2019.
- MacLachlan, Colin (April 1972). "The Indian Directorate: Forced Acculturation in Portuguese America (1757-1799)". The Americas. 28 (4): 357–387. doi:10.2307/980202. JSTOR 980202. S2CID 147202016.
- Maclachlan, Colin M. (May 1979). "Slavery, Ideology, and Institutional Change: the Impact of the Enlightenment on Slavery in Late Eighteenth-Century Maranhão". Journal of Latin American Studies. 11 (1): 1–17. doi:10.1017/S0022216X00022276. S2CID 144509664.
- Magalhães, Romero Antero de. "Um novo método de governo: Francisco Xavier de Mendonça Furtado, Governador e Capitão-General do Grão-Pará e Maranhão (1751-1759)" (A new method of government: Francisco Xavier de Mendonça Furtado, Governor and Captain-General of Grão-Pará and Maranhão (1751-1759)), Revista, Instituto Histórico e Geográfico Brasileiro (Brazilian Historic and Geographic Institute) (IHGB), Vol. 165/424, October–December 2004. pp. 183–209. (in Portuguese). Accessed 8 January 2019. ISSN 0101-4366.
- Marcílio, Maria Luiza. "The Population of Colonial Brazil." The Cambridge History of Latin America. Edited by Leslie Bethell. Cambridge University Press, 1984. pp. 38–64. (in English). ISBN 978-0-521-23223-4.
- Mas-Sandoval, Alex; Arauna, Lara R; Gouveia, Mateus H; Barreto, Mauricio L; Horta, Bernardo L; Lima-Costa, Maria Fernanda; Pereira, Alexandre C; Salzano, Francisco M; Hünemeier, Tábita; Tarazona-Santos, Eduardo; Bortolini, Maria Cátira; Comas, David (22 July 2019). "Reconstructed lost Native American populations from Eastern Brazil are shaped by differential Jê/Tupi ancestry". Genome Biology and Evolution. 11 (9): 2593–2604. doi:10.1093/gbe/evz161. PMC 6756188. PMID 31328768.
- Mattos, Yllan de. A última Inquisição: os meios de ação e funcionamento da Inquisição no Grão-Pará pombalino (1763-1769) (The Last Inquisition: The means of action and operation of the Inquisition in the Pombaline Grão-Pará (1763-1769)). Dissertation presented to the Postgraduate Program in History of the Universidade Federal Fluminense, as a requirement for obtaining a master's degree in History. April 2009. (in Portuguese). Accessed 18 January 2019.
- Maxwell, Kenneth. Conflicts and Conspiracies: Brazil and Portugal 1750–1808. Routledge, 2004. (in English). ISBN 978-0-415-94989-7.
- Maxwell, Kenneth (2001). "The Spark: Pombal, the Amazon and the Jesuits". Portuguese Studies. 17: 168–183. doi:10.1353/port.2001.0008. JSTOR 41105166. S2CID 245842417.
- ____. Pombal, Paradox of the Enlightenment. Cambridge University Press, 1995. (in English). ISBN 978-0521450447
- Mendonça, Marcos Carneiro de. A Amazônia na era Pombalina: Correspondência do Governador e Capitão-General do Estado do Grão-Pará e Maranhão, Francisco Xavier de Mendonça Furtado 1751–1759 (The Amazon in the Pombaline era: Correspondence of the Governor and Captain-General of the State of Grão-Pará and Maranhão, Francisco Xavier de Mendonça Furtado 1751–1759). 2nd ed. Vol. 1, 19 January 1749 – 12 November 1753. Senado Federal, Congresso Nacional, Brasília, 2005. (in Portuguese). Accessed 14 January 2019.
- ____. A Amazônia na era Pombalina, 2nd ed. Vol. II, 14 November 1753 – 18 November 1755. Senado Federal, Congresso Nacional, Brasília, 2005. (in Portuguese). Accessed 12 February 2019.
- ____. A Amazônia na era Pombalina, 2nd ed. Vol. III. Senado Federal, Congresso Nacional, Brasília, 2005. (in Portuguese). Accessed 12 February 2019.
- Metcalf, Alida C. Family and Frontier in Colonial Brazil: Santana de Parnaíba, 1580-1822. University of California Press, 1992. (in English). ISBN 0-520-07574-9.
- ____. Go-betweens and the Colonization of Brazil: 1500–1600. University of Texas Press, 2013. (in English). ISBN 0-292-71276-6.
- Miller, Robert J. and Micheline D'Angelis. "Brazil, Indigenous Peoples, and the International Law of Discovery". Lewis & Clark Law School Legal Research Paper Series, Paper No. 2011- 9, 2011. (in English). Accessed 4 January 2019. Brooklyn Journal of International Law, Vol. 37, Issue 1, Article 1, 2011. pp. 1–61. (in English). Accessed 14 February 2019.
- Monteiro, John Manuel. Negros da terra: Índios e bandeirantes nas origens de São Paulo (Blacks of the Earth: Indians and bandeirantes in the origins of São Paulo). Companhia das Letras, 1994. (in Portuguese). ISBN 85-7164-394-6.
- Osório, Helen (2014). "Colonização". E-Dicionário da Terra e do Território no Império Português. doi:10.15847/cehc.edittip.2014v028.
- Papavero, Nelson, Abner Chiquieri, William L. Overal, Nelson Sanjadand Riccardo Mugnai. Os escritos de Giovanni Angelo Brunelli, 1722-1804, sobre a Amazônia Brasileira (The writings of Giovanni Angelo Brunelli, 1722–1804, on the Brazilian Amazon). Fórum Landi, Universidade Federal do Pará, 2011. (in Portuguese and Italian). Accessed 5 March 2019. ISBN 85-63728-04-0.
- Raymundo, Letícia de Oliveira. "O Estado do Grão-Pará e Maranhão na nova ordem política pombalina: A Companhia Geral do Grão-Pará e Maranhão e o Diretório dos Índios (1755-1757)" (The State of Grão-Pará and Maranhão in Pombal's new political order: The Grão-Pará and Maranhão General Company and the Indians Directory (1755-1757)). Published in Research Reports, Almanack braziliense, Instituto de Estudos Brasileiros (IEB), Universidade de São Paulo, No. 3, May 2006. pp. 124–134. Online version (in Portuguese). Accessed 7 February 2019. ISSN 2236-4633.
- Restall, Matthew, ed. Beyond black and red: African-native relations in colonial Latin America. University of New Mexico Press, 2005. (in English). ISBN 0-8263-2403-7.
- Richards, John F. The Unending Frontier: An Environmental History of the Early Modern World. University of California Press, 2005. ISBN 978-0-520-24678-2.
- Richardson, Lucas. "For the Good of the King's Vassals" Francisco Xavier de Mendonça Furtado and the Portuguese Amazon, 1751-1759. Part of the requirements for the degree of Master of Arts in the College of Arts and Sciences at the University of Kentucky, 2015. Published online by UKnowledge. (in English). Accessed 20 December 2018.
- Ricupero, Rodrigo. "Brasil, Capitanias Hereditárias do" (Brazil, Hereditary Captaincies of). Enciclopédia Virtual da Expansão Portuguesa (Virtual Encyclopedia of Portuguese Expansion). Centro de História de Além-Mar (Centre of Overseas History) (CHAM), Faculdade de Ciências Sociais e Humanas da Universidade Nova de Lisboa e da Universidade dos Açores. Accessed 8 January 2019. (in Portuguese and English). ISBN 989-8492-38-4.
- Robles, Wilder and Henry Veltmeyer. The Politics of Agrarian Reform in Brazil: The Landless Rural Workers Movement. Palgrave Macmillan, 2015. ISBN 1-137-51719-0.
- Roller, Heather F. Amazonian Routes: Indigenous Mobility and Colonial Communities in Northern Brazil. Stanford University Press, 2014. (in English). ISBN 0-8047-8708-5.
- Safier, Neil. "The Confines of the Colony." The Imperial Map: Cartography and the Mastery of Empire. Edited by James R. Akerman. University of Chicago Press, 2009. pp. 133–184. (in English). Accessed 10 January 2019. ISBN 0-226-01076-7.
- Santos, Fabiano Vilaça dos. "A Casa e o Real Serviço: Francisco Xavier de Mendonça Furtado e o Governo do Estado do Grão-Pará e Maranhão (1751-1759)" (The House and the Royal Service: Francisco Xavier de Mendonça Furtado and the Government of the State of Grão-Pará and Maranhão (1751–1759)). Revista, Instituto Histórico Geográfico Brasileiro (Brazilian Historic and Geographic Institute) (IHGB). Rio de Janeiro, January–March 2010. Vol. 446, pp. 74–124. (in Portuguese) Accessed 8 January 2019.
- Silva, Andrée Mansuy-Diniz. "Portugal and Brazil: imperial re-organization 1870–1808." The Cambridge History of Latin America, Vol. 1: Colonial Latin America. Edited by Leslie Bethell. Cambridge University Press, 1984. pp. 469–508. (in English). ISBN 978-0-521-23223-4.
- Silva, José Manuel Azevedo e. "O modelo pombalino de colonização da Amazónia" (The Pombaline Model of Colonization of the Amazonia). Revista de História da Sociedade e da Cultura, Universidade de Coimbra, Vol 3. 2003 (in Portuguese). Accessed 28 February 2019. ISSN 1645-2259
- Soriano, Simão José da Luz. Historia de reinado de el-rei D. José e da administração do marquez de Pombal : precedida de uma breve notícia dos antecedentes reinados, a começar no de el-rei D. João IV, em 1640. (History of the reign of King Jose and of the administration of the Marquis of Pombal: preceded by a brief report of the antecedents, beginning with the one of King João IV, in 1640), Vol. 1. Thomaz Quintino Antunes, 1867. (in Portuguese). Accessed 18 January 2019.
- Sousa, Claudia Rocha de. "O "pestilento mal" das bexigas na Amazônia colonial na primeira metade do século XVIII" (The "pestilent illness" of smallpox in the colonial Amazon in the first half of the eighteenth century). A paper delivered at the IV International Conference of Colonial History (Portuguese: IV Encontro Internacional de História Colonial) held at Belém do Pará on 3–6 September 2012 and published under the title Anais do IV Encontro Internacional de História Colonial. Vol. 9, Culturas Amazônicas (Annals of the IV International Conference of Colonial History. Vol. 9, Amazonian Cultures). Editora Açaí, 2014. pp. 14–27. (in Portuguese). Accessed 4 February 2019. ISBN 85-61586-59-1.
- Tambs, Lewis A. (April 2004). "Brazil's Expanding Frontiers". The Americas. 23 (2): 165–179. doi:10.2307/980583. JSTOR 980583. S2CID 147574561.
- Venturi, Franco. The End of the Old Regime in Europe, 1776–1789, Part I: The Great States of the West. Princeton University Press, 2014. (in English). ISBN 0-691-60571-8.
- Waisberg, Tatiana (12 May 2017). "The Treaty of Tordesillas and the (re)Invention of International Law in the Age of Discovery". Meridiano 47 - Journal of Global Studies. 18. doi:10.20889/m47e18003 (inactive 10 December 2025).
- Zeron, Carlos Alberto de Moura Ribeiro. Ligne de foi : La Compagnie de Jésus et l'esclavage dans le processus de formation de la société coloniale en Amérique portugaise (Line of Faith: The Society of Jesus and Slavery in the Process of Formation of Colonial Society in Portuguese America). Honoré Champion edition, 2008. (in French). ISBN 2-7453-1759-8.
