= Battle of Évora (1808) =

1808 battle during the Peninsular War

- Part of the Peninsular War
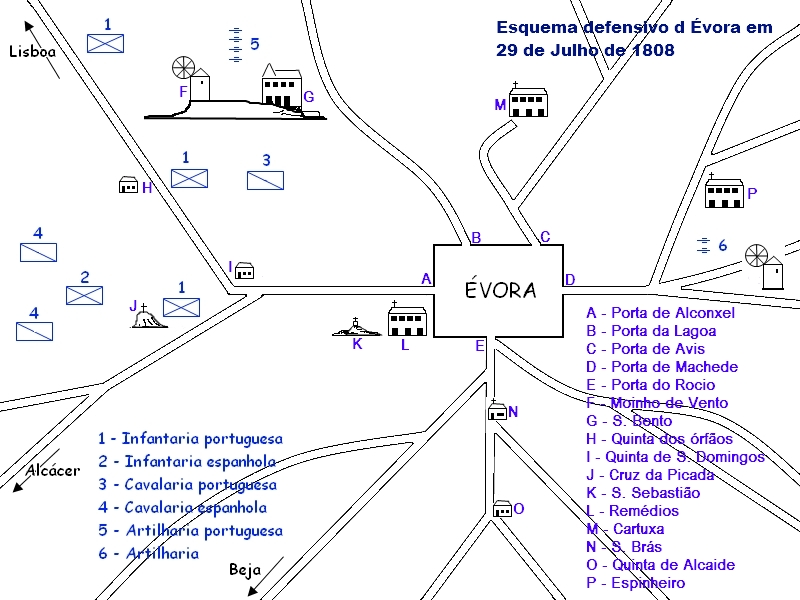
- Scheme of the defense of Evora, done by J. C. Baker
Date	29 July 1808
Location	Évora, Portugal 38°34′17″N 7°54′31″W
Result	French victory

Belligerents
(First French Empire) French Empire	Kingdom of Portugal; Kingdom of Spain

Commanders and leaders
(First French Empire) Louis Henri Loison	(Kingdom of Portugal) Francisco Leite; Federico Moretti

Strength
7,000	3,000

Casualties and losses
300	2,000

Peninsular war: Portugal
1807 1808 1809 1810 1811

The Battle of Évora (29 July 1808) saw an Imperial French division under Louis Henri Loison attack a combined Portuguese-Spanish force led by Francisco de Paula Leite de Sousa. Encountering Leite's smaller body of soldiers outside Évora, the French easily brushed them aside and went on to storm the city, which was held by poorly armed townsmen and militia. The French butchered the Portuguese defenders and brutally sacked the town. Loison was known among the Portuguese as the Maneta (One-Hand), because of his amputated arm. From savage acts such as those committed at Évora, the saying ir para o Maneta (going to the One-Hand) appeared. The clash occurred during the Peninsular War, phase of the Napoleonic Wars. Évora is located about 110 kilometres (68 mi) east of Lisbon.

In November 1807, a French army led by Jean-Andoche Junot mounted a successful Invasion of Portugal supported by allied Spanish troops. For several months, the French were able to maintain themselves. However, the Spanish Dos de Mayo Uprising against the French in May 1808 was quickly followed by a Portuguese revolt. Abandoning the north and south regions of the country, the French concentrated their forces to hold central Portugal. Junot sent Loison east to relieve the garrison of Elvas Fortress. After defeating the Portuguese-Spanish force at Évora, Loison reached Elvas. But he was soon recalled in an unsuccessful attempt to repel a British army under Sir Arthur Wellesley that had landed on the coast north of Lisbon.

== Background ==
Santo Antão Church in Évora

Emperor Napoleon concluded the Treaties of Tilsit in July 1807, ending the War of the Fourth Coalition. While the Kingdom of Prussia was humiliated, the Russian Empire became an ally of France. After his triumph, the Emperor looked to the west, where Portugal was the oldest continental ally of the United Kingdom. Portugal's Prince Regent John had declined to join the Continental System against British trade. Furthermore, Napoleon resented Britain's trade with Portugal's colony of Brazil, wished to seize Portugal's shipping, and wanted to deny the Royal Navy the use of Lisbon's major port.

On 19 July, the French ambassador delivered an ultimatum to the Portuguese government. On 2 August, the 1st Corps of the Gironde Observation Army was established with General of Division Jean-Andoche Junot in command. At first the Prince Regent did not comply with all of Napoleon's terms. But as the menace of Junot's army increased, John caved in to nearly all of the Emperor's demands. But by this time, Junot's 25,000-man army was on the march across Spain. Napoleon informed his lieutenant that the Portuguese had declared war on the United Kingdom, but that it was too late. The Emperor wanted Junot in Lisbon by 1 December. Despite horrible weather, Junot fulfilled his master's instructions to the letter. The French Invasion of Portugal encountered no armed Portuguese resistance and Junot entered Lisbon with a flying column of 1,500 weary men on 30 November.

Following a previously arranged plan, the Prince Regent and his Court (including most of the Government's officials and their families, in a total of around 15,000 people) embarked in the Portuguese Fleet and escaped to Brazil, escorted by Admiral Sir Sidney Smith's Royal Navy squadron, shortly before the French arrived at Lisbon.

While Junot's soldiers saw no formal resistance, numbers of them had died from exposure during the march, while others had been lynched by angry Portuguese peasants. The first riot occurred in Lisbon on 13 December, but it was easily put down. Junot first disbanded the Portuguese Army, then ordered the imposition of heavy taxes, which angered the population.

== Rebellion ==
By the spring of 1808, Junot's position in Portugal was relatively secure. He had been reinforced by 4,000 troops, which more than replaced the men who died during the hard marches of the invasion. Of the three French-allied Spanish divisions that had supported Junot's invasion, General Francisco Solano's troops had returned to Andalusia. However, General Juan Carrafa stayed on in the Lisbon area with 7,000 Spaniards, and General Domingo Belestá occupied Porto with 6,000 more. Portugal remained quiet because her army was disbanded or integrated into the Portuguese Legion sent away from Portugal to fight for Napoleon, her ruling classes had mostly fled to Brazil, and her civil authorities submitted too readily to the French yoke.

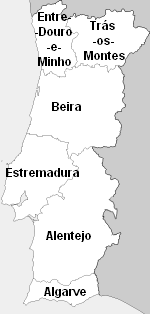
Provinces of Portugal in 1808

Because Portugal's ports were closed by the British blockade, her wines could no longer be sold to England nor could her goods be traded to Brazil. The French put 10,000 persons to work in the arsenal and shipyard, but Lisbon soon filled with large numbers of unemployed people who thronged the streets begging for alms. A message from Napoleon arrived in May ordering Junot to send 4,000 troops to Ciudad Rodrigo to support Marshal Jean-Baptiste Bessières in the north of Spain and 8,000 more to link up with General of Division Pierre Dupont de l'Étang in Andalusia. These were the last instructions to reach Portugal from Paris.

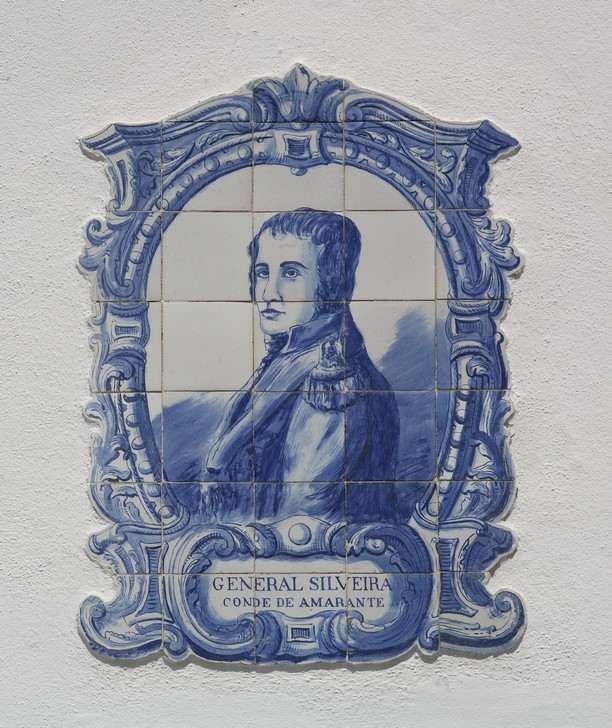
Francisco Silveira

The Spanish Dos de Mayo Uprising against the French completely altered the situation. When news of the revolt reached Porto on 6 June, Belestá seized as prisoners the governor of the city, General of Division François Jean Baptiste Quesnel, his staff, and his 30-man escort. The Spanish general assembled Porto's leaders and urged them to form a government to resist the French. Loyally obeying the orders of the Galician Junta, Belesta marched his troops away to join the Spanish armies. For over a week after the Spanish troops left, Porto's leaders did nothing. Some even sent secret letters to Junot, professing their loyalty, and the military governor took down the national flag from the citadel. But, finding the occupation forces gone, Trás-os-Montes Province rose in revolt between 9 and 12 June. At Bragança, retired General Manoel Jorge Gomes de Sepúlveda was selected as the commander, while Colonel Francisco Silveira was chosen to lead at Vila Real.

After hearing of Belestá's defection on 9 June, Junot plotted to disarm Caraffa's division. Ordered to Junot's headquarters, the Spanish general was placed in custody. Caraffa's troops were either directed to appear at military reviews or to shift positions. While the Spanish units were carrying out these orders, they were suddenly encircled by French troops and made prisoners. The only unit that escaped intact was the Reina Light Cavalry Regiment Nr. 2 when its colonel disregarded his instructions and escaped to Porto. Elements of the Murcia and Valencia Infantry Regiments also got away, fleeing to Badajoz. But Junot caught 6,000 of Caraffa's soldiers and put them aboard prison hulks in Lisbon's harbor. The French officers in charge of the forts had orders to sink the vessels if the prisoners tried to escape. The Spaniards were only released after the Convention of Cintra. On 16 June, the rebellion spread to the south, when the Portuguese town of Olhão in Algarve Province rose against the French. On the 18th, the citizens of Faro followed suit. The French governor of Algarve, General of Brigade Antoine Maurin was seized in his sick bed and, together with 70 French soldiers, bundled on board a British warship as prisoners. Colonel Maransin gathered the one battalion each of the Légion du Midi and the 26th Line Infantry Regiment that served as the garrison of Algarve. With these 1,200 men, Maransin withdrew to Mértola. The insurgents did not pursue.

== Countermeasures ==
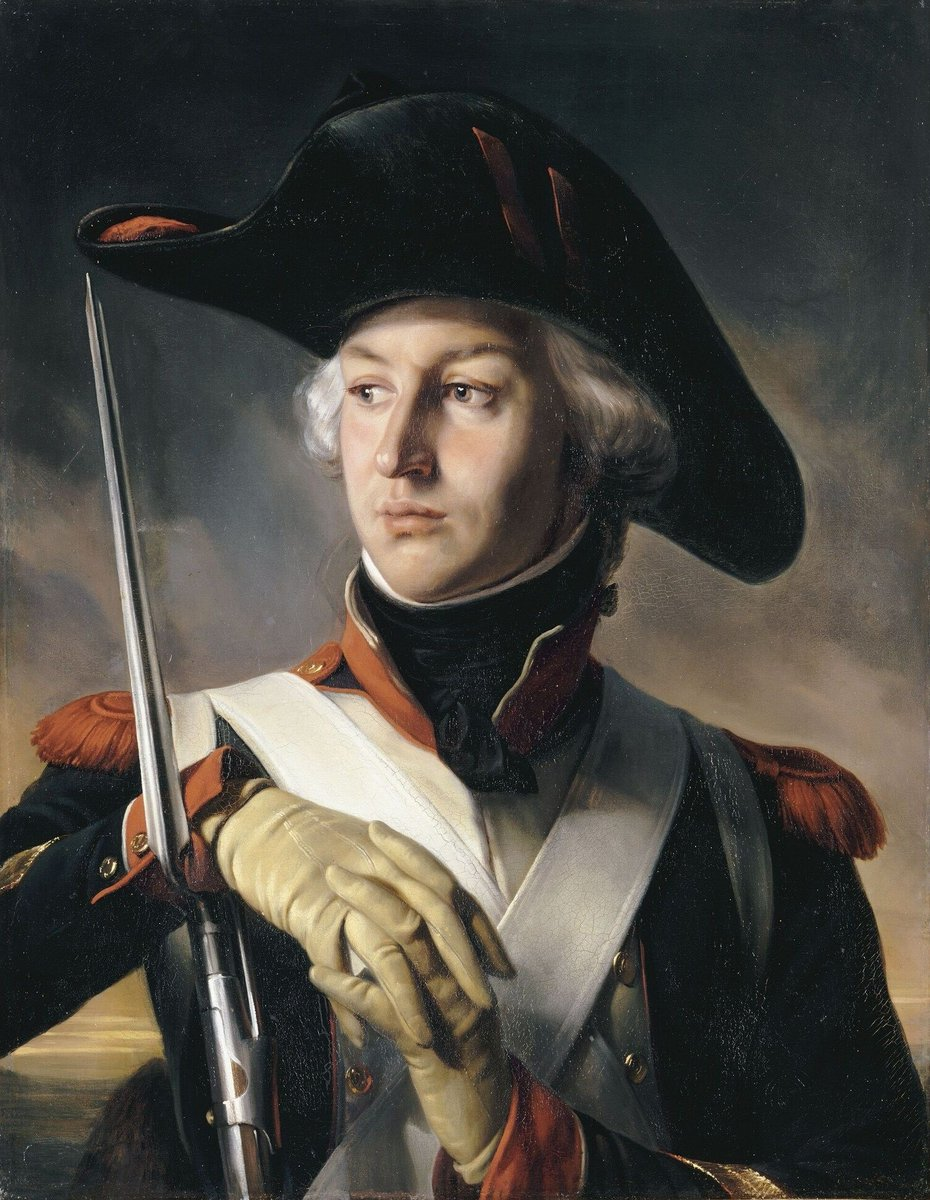
Jean-Andoche Junot

One advantage that Junot had over the Portuguese was that he occupied the nation's only major city and military arsenal. Among the country's cities, only Lisbon was capable of equipping an army. Junot's position was complicated by the presence of a French-allied Russian naval squadron under Admiral Dmitry Senyavin in Lisbon harbor. The Russian admiral vowed to defend himself if the British fleet tried to enter the port, but he refused to land his marines to assist the French on land. Senyavin pointed out that his nation was not at war with Portugal. Meanwhile, his sailors consumed large amounts of Junot's limited stocks of food.

Trying to follow Napoleon's last orders, Junot dispatched General of Brigade Jean-Jacques Avril and 3,000 troops toward Badajoz. Avril reached the frontier to find his force faced by a body of artillery-armed Spanish militia behind the Guadiana River. Hearing that Dupont never got beyond Córdoba and that Badajoz was held by large numbers of Spanish troops, the French general backtracked to Estremoz in Alentejo Province. On 12 June, General of Division Louis Henri Loison marched east from Almeida in Beira Province with a brigade. He cleared the Spanish garrison from Fort Concepcion and reached the environs of Ciudad Rodrigo. At this time he received intelligence that the city held a considerable garrison, Spain was in revolt, and Bessières was far away. Returning to Almeida on the 15th, he heard that Porto was teetering on the edge of rebellion. Taking 2,000 men and a few cannons, he set out for Porto but on 21 June stumbled into a hornet's nest of guerillas who sniped at him and rolled boulders down from the heights. Loison decided that his small force was overmatched and withdrew to Almeida.

Meanwhile, trouble broke out in Lisbon at the annual celebration of the Feast of Corpus Christi on 16 June. Junot permitted the festival to take place, but concentrated 15,000 soldiers in the city to prevent a riot. Nevertheless, as the religious procession made its way through the streets, a panic broke out among the people who surged through the lines of soldiers. Just as the artillery was ready to fire on the mob, Junot coolly rode into the crowd and ordered his men to refrain from firing. He managed to clear the streets, calmed the people, and insisted that the procession continue. Though Junot's level-headed action averted a massacre, Lisbon remained rife with wild rumors. On top of this, a British expedition under General Brent Spencer hovered off the coast. Spencer had only 5,000 troops, but Junot had no way of knowing this.

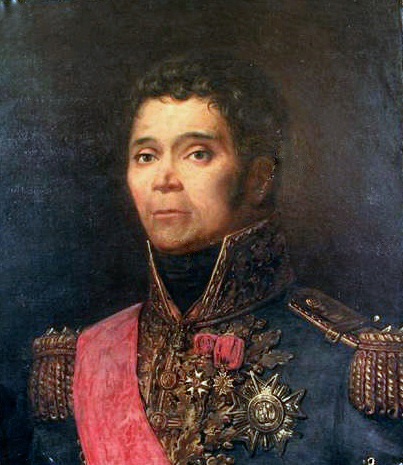
François de Kellermann

On 18 June, a popular riot broke out in Porto, which forced the authorities to declare in favor of the rebellion. A Supreme Junta was set up, and the Bishop of Porto, Antonio de Castro was selected as its chief. The lesser Juntas at Bragança and Vila Real deferred to the Porto Junta's authority. The Junta re-established the 2nd, 12th, 21st, and 24th Infantry, the 6th Caçadores, and the 6th, 11th, and 12th Cavalry Regiments. The Junta was only able to find weapons for 5,000 regular soldiers that were assigned to Bernardim Freire de Andrade to command. In addition, 12,000 to 15,000 ill-armed militia flocked to join the cause.

In a 25 June 1808 council of war, Junot and his generals decided to abandon the northern and southern provinces and defend central Portugal. They rejected as too risky the alternative of evacuating Portugal and retreating across Spain. The generals concluded to hold the fortresses of Almeida, Elvas, and Peniche and concentrate the army around Lisbon. Orders went out to Loison at Almeida, Avril at Estremoz, Maransin at Mértola, and General of Division François Étienne de Kellermann at Elvas. Even before receiving the new directive, Maransin was on the move for Lisbon. On 26 June he arrived before Beja and found it defended by its townspeople. His troops easily chased off the amateur soldiers and thoroughly looted the city. A number of messengers were killed or captured by the Portuguese guerillas, but eventually all the outlying forces received their orders. According to one report, only one out of 20 couriers got through to Loison.

On 22 June, Avril marched on Vila Viçosa where one company of the 86th Line was besieged by the townspeople. The French routed the Portuguese, killing many, and plundered the town. Kellermann left one battalion of the 2nd Swiss Regiment and four companies of the 86th Line, a total of 1,400 men, in garrison at Elvas and returned west to Lisbon. On the way, he was joined by Avril's force at Estremoz and Maransin's force at Évora. He dropped off a brigade led by General of Brigade Jean François Graindorge at Setúbal and reached Lisbon without incident.

After receiving his orders, Loison made up a 1,200-man garrison for Almeida by culling all the soldiers who were not fit for campaigning. With the rest, he left Almeida on 4 July and reached Abrantes a week later. His troops were harassed on the entire route. At Guarda, the citizens resisted, so the place was pillaged and put to the torch. About 200 French soldiers became casualties, including stragglers who were done to death by the peasants. Because his troops' path was marked by a line of wrecked villages, Loison acquired the name Maneta (One-Hand), and he was cursed for years afterward by the Portuguese.

By the last week of June, the insurrection spread to Coimbra. A student, Bernardo Zagalo, led a force to Figueira da Foz where it captured a small French garrison. Soon after, Freire brought his 5,000 troops south to the line of the Mondego River. Junot sent a 3,000-man force under General of Brigade Pierre Margaron that stamped out the rebellion south of the Mondego on 5 July. Junot had 24,000 troops concentrated near Lisbon by the second week of July.

== Battle ==
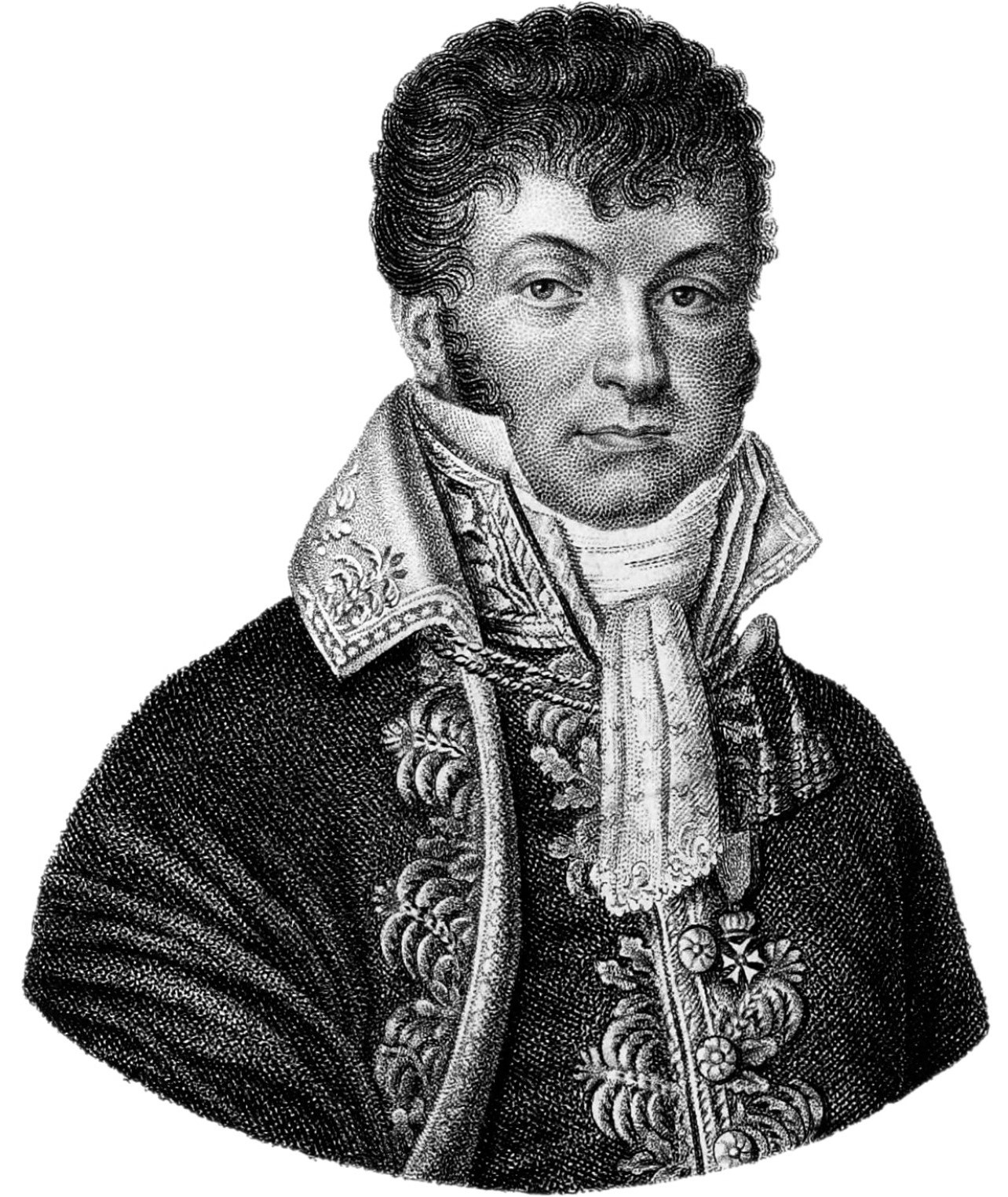
Louis Henri Loison

In mid-July 1808, there was a lull in which neither side made a move. At the end of the month, Junot decided to send Loison to clear a path to Elvas. He provided Loison with a force that included the 4th and 5th Provisional Dragoons (1,248), two battalions of converged grenadiers (1,100), 12 companies from the 1st and 2nd Battalions of the 86th Line (1,667), 1st Battalion of the Hanoverian Legion (804), and the 3rd Battalions of the 12th Light (1,253), 15th Light (1,305), and 58th Line (1,428). Though the numbers add up to 8,805, historian Charles Oman wrote that 1,200 men need to be subtracted from the total to account for the detached grenadier companies. The force counted at least 7,000 men and was supported by eight artillery pieces. Loison set out from Lisbon on 25 July. This source provided the units but not their individual strengths. Smith gave the French a total of 8,800.

The Junta for Alentejo Province made its headquarters at Évora. The Junta named General Francisco de Paula Leite de Sousa as its commander, but he had difficulty arming more than a small force. On 29 July 1808, Loison's troops reached the outskirts of Évora to find a Portuguese-Spanish force arrayed across their path. Leite led one and a half battalions of Portuguese infantry and 120 cavalrymen. From Badajoz, Colonel Federico Moretti brought an additional one and a half battalions of Spanish infantry, the Maria Luisa Hussar Regiment Nr. 5, and seven field guns. Behind them, manning the ancient walls of Évora was a motley collection of townsmen and peasants armed with bird guns and pikes. The allied regulars totalled about 2,900 men.

Leite and Moretti would have been better advised to put their soldiers behind Évora's crumbling walls. Their battle line buckled under the impact of Loison's opening charge. The Spanish hussars fled at once, and Leite galloped off with unseemly haste. Most of the infantry were more resolute and rallied behind the town wall. However, the pursuing French burst into the town in several places and massacred the badly armed defenders. Many non-combatants were probably killed as well. Having disposed of the armed opposition, the French subjected the unfortunate town to a brutal sack. The Spanish ravaged the country more brutally in their retreat than the French.

According to Maximilien Sebastien Foy the Portuguese and Spanish lost 2,000 men. Paul Thiébault claimed that the defenders suffered 8,000 casualties, which Oman found unlikely. French losses were 90 killed and 200 wounded. On 1 August, Loison continued his march to Elvas, where he drove off a large number of militia that were besieging the place. At Elvas he received a message from Junot directing him to return at once. A British expedition under Sir Arthur Wellesley landed on the coast on 1 August. Loison immediately turned around and headed back to Lisbon. On the way, he dropped off the Hanoverian Legion to hold Santarém. The next action was the Battle of Roliça on 17 August 1808.

== Aftermath ==
British intervention led to the subsequent Battle of Roliça and the Battle of Vimeiro.

== See also ==
- Timeline of the Peninsular War
