= Pierre Margaron =

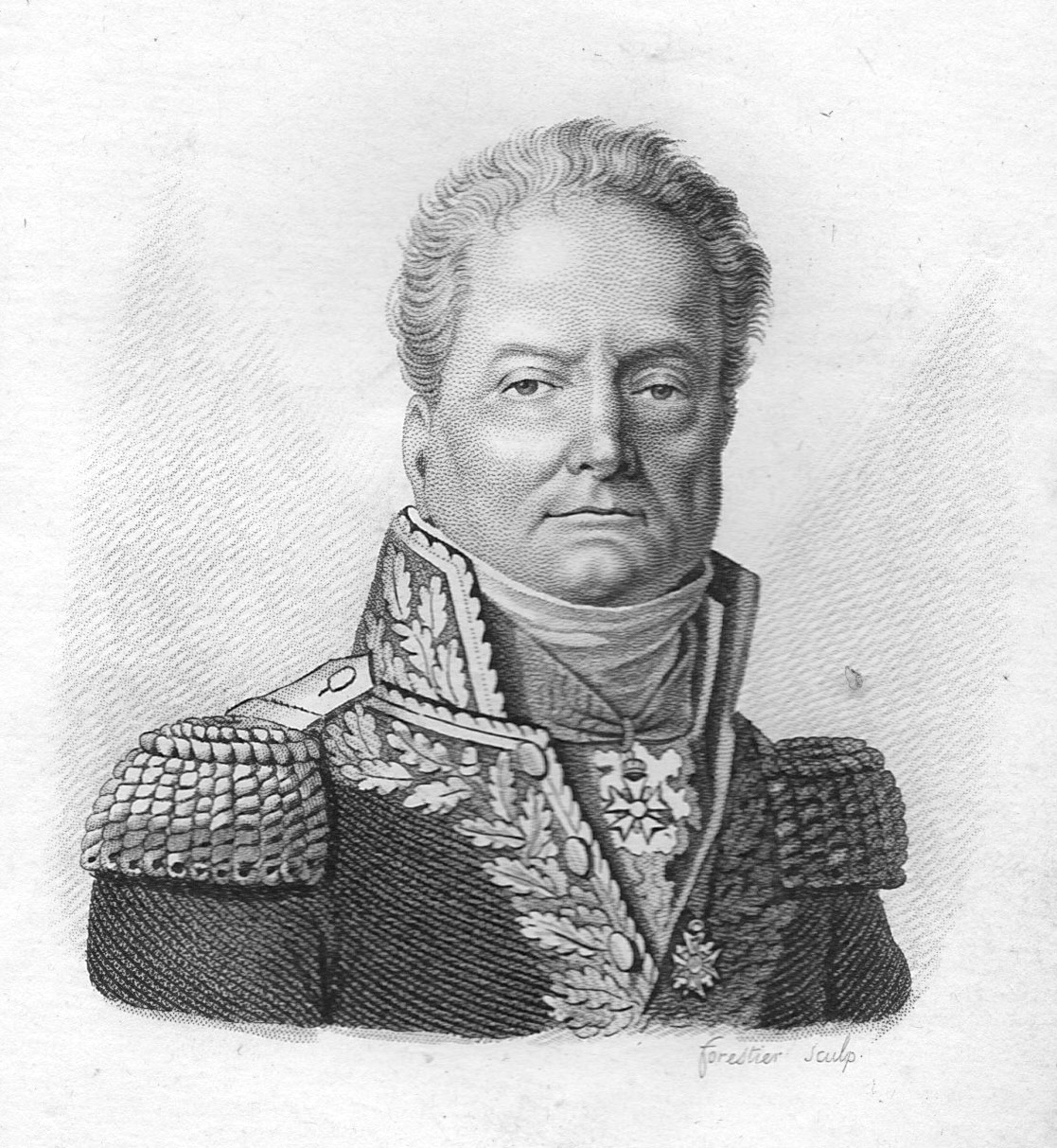
- Pierre Margaron
- Born: 1 May 1765; Lyon, France
- Died: 16 December 1824 (aged 59) Paris, France
- Allegiance: France
- Branch: Cavalry
- Service years: 1792–1821
- Rank: General of Division
- Conflicts: War of the First Coalition; War of the Second Coalition; Battle of Trebbia; Battle of Novi; Battle of Genola; Battle of Pozzolo; War of the Third Coalition; Battle of Austerlitz; War of the Fourth Coalition; Battle of Jena; Battle of Lübeck; Peninsular War; Battle of Évora; Battle of Vimeiro; War of the Sixth Coalition; Battle of Leipzig
- Awards: Légion d'Honneur, CC 1804; Order of Saint-Louis, 1814
- Other work: Baron of the Empire, 1809

Pierre Margaron (French pronunciation: [pjɛʁ maʁɡaʁɔ̃]; 1 May 1765 – 16 December 1824) led the French cavalry at the Battle of Vimeiro in 1808. He joined a volunteer battalion in 1792. He rose in rank during the French Revolutionary Wars until he commanded a heavy cavalry regiment in 1798. He led his horsemen at the Trebbia, Novi and Genola in 1799 and Pozzolo and San Massimo in 1800. He became a general of brigade in 1803 and led a corps light cavalry brigade at Austerlitz, Jena and Lübeck. He participated in the 1807 invasion of Portugal and fought at Évora and Vimeiro. From 1810 to 1812 he held a post in the interior. He became a general of division in 1813 and led troops at the Battle of Leipzig. His surname is one of the names inscribed under the Arc de Triomphe, on Column 2.

== Revolution ==
Margaron was born on 1 May 1765 at Lyon, France. He joined a free company as a temporary captain before the unit was absorbed into the Legion of the Ardennes on 15 August 1792. He was named second chef de bataillon of the Legion on 10 December 1792 before being promoted to major on 10 April 1793. Four days later he formally took command of the Legion of the Ardennes. He became an adjutant general in the Army of the North sometime in 1794–1795 and transferred to the Army of Sambre-et-Meuse in 1795–1796.

On 23 December 1798 Margaron became chef de brigade (colonel) of the 1st Cavalry Regiment, which later became the 1st Cuirassiers. In 1799 the 1st Cavalry fought at the Battle of Trebbia on 17–20 June, Battle of Novi on 15 August 1799 and Battle of Genola on 4 November. At the Trebbia, the 263-strong 1st Cavalry was part of Joseph Hélie Désiré Perruquet de Montrichard's division. The division's attack on 19 June was repulsed. At Novi, the 1st Cavalry was part of Antoine Richepanse's Cavalry Reserve. Richepanse's horsemen made two counterattacks against the Austrians forming the Allied right wing. Margaron was wounded by a bullet at Novi and broke his right leg at Genola (Fossano) while completing a mission for Jean Étienne Championnet.

The 123-man 1st Cavalry was in François Étienne de Kellermann's brigade at the Battle of Marengo on 14 June 1800. The regiment was part of Kellermann's famous charge late in the afternoon. Another source does not mention Marengo, but tells about an incident that occurred later in the campaign when Guillaume Brune was in command of the Army of Italy. Margaron with only 200 horsemen and two artillery pieces was nearly surrounded by enemy cavalry that issued from the entrenched camp of Verona. He led two vigorous charges and retook the village of San Massimo, driving back and capturing 100 enemy horsemen. According to its service record, the 1st Cavalry fought at the Battle of Pozzolo (Mozambano) on 25–26 December 1800 and at San Mossimo in 1801.

== Empire ==
=== 1803–1806 ===
Margaron received promotion to general of brigade on 29 August 1803. He became a member of the Légion d'Honneur on 11 December 1803 and became a commander of the Légion on 14 June 1804. He was first sent to join the cavalry camp at Saint-Omer and later posted to IV Corps under Marshal Jean-de-Dieu Soult. He took part in the War of the Third Coalition which ended with the Battle of Austerlitz on 2 December 1805. At Austerlitz he commanded the IV Corps light cavalry brigade, which counted 12 squadrons from the 8th Hussar and the 11th and 26th Chasseurs à Cheval Regiments. During the 1805 campaign Margaron was wounded by bullets two times. After returning to France, he was placed on the inactive list on 11 April 1806, but was recalled to active duty on 28 July.

At the Battle of Jena on 14 October 1806, Margaron led one of Soult's two IV Corps light cavalry brigades. His brigade consisted of the 8th Hussars and 22nd Chasseurs à Cheval. At Jena, Soult attacked 5,000 Prussians under Friedrich Jacob von Holtzendorff guarding the northern flank. Surprised by French troops lunging at his left flank, Holtzendorff withdrew in good order, well covered by his cavalry. At length, Soult's light cavalry burst through the Prussian cavalry and light infantry screen and pounced on one of the retreating Prussian columns, capturing 400 men, six artillery pieces and two colors. After deploying his troops near the village of Nerkwitz, Holtzendorff found French infantry circling his left flank while Soult's cavalry charged from the front. The Prussian force collapsed; its cavalry rallied later, but the infantry fled from the field. Margaron's brigade fought at the Battle of Lübeck on 6–7 November 1806.

=== Portugal ===
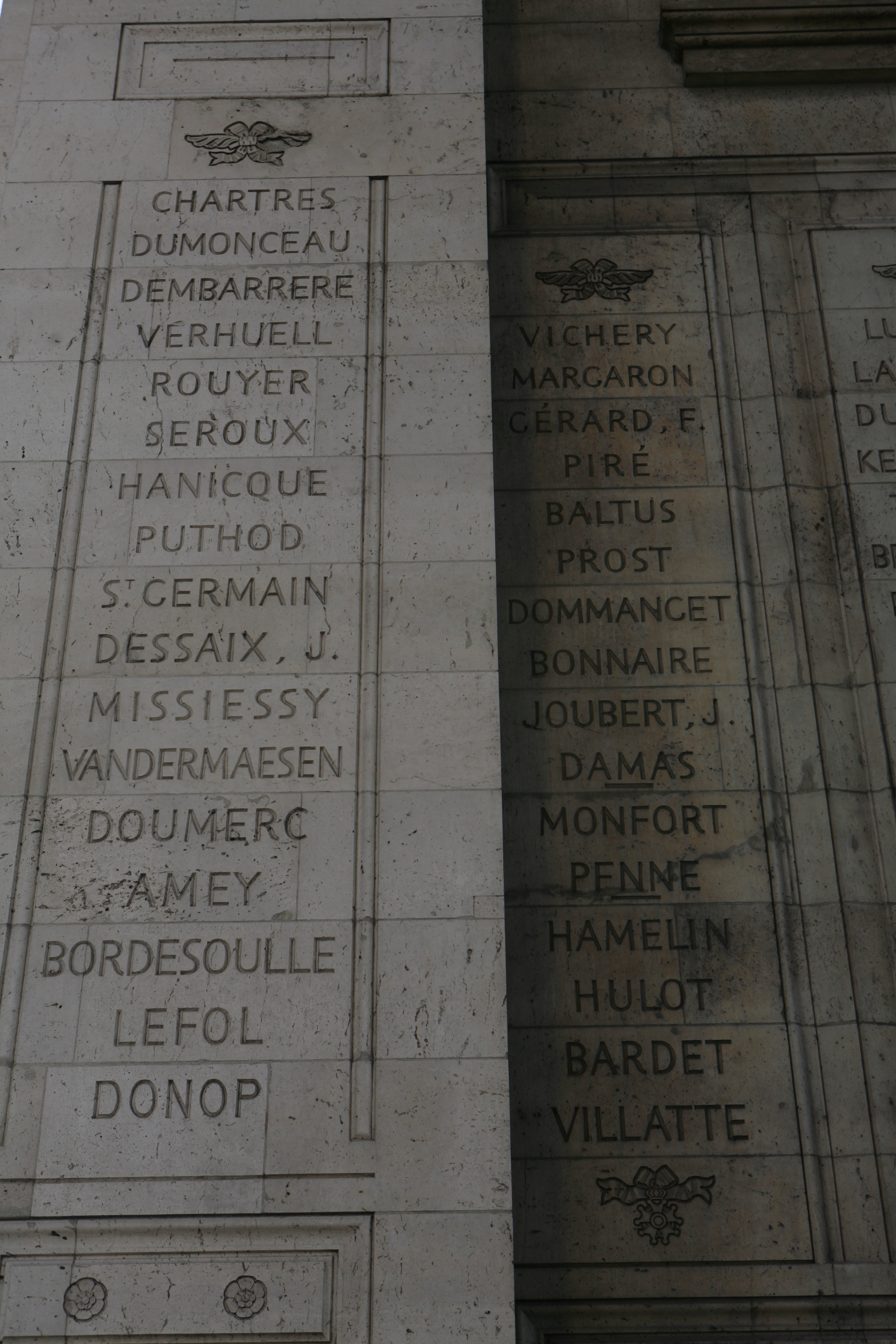
Margaron is the 2nd name under the Arc de Triomphe's Column 2 at right.

In 1807 Margaron was assigned to the 1st Corps of Observation of the Gironde under Jean-Andoche Junot. Margaron and Antoine Maurin led brigades in the 1,754-man cavalry division under François Étienne de Kellermann. The mounted troops included one squadron each from the 1st, 3rd, 4th, 5th, 9th and 15th Dragoon and 26th Chasseurs à Cheval Regiments. All squadrons counted between 236 and 262 troopers. With Spain's permission, Junot's force crossed the Bidasoa River on 18 October 1807 and was in Salamanca by 12 November, prepared to invade Portugal. Little did the Spanish know that Napoleon soon planned to overthrow their kingdom as well. Soon after Junot's corps launched the 1807 invasion of Portugal, logistical arrangements broke down and half the army's horses died. Nevertheless, on 30 November 1807, a 1,500-man French vanguard occupied Lisbon, having faced no military opposition. Then cavalrymen then remounted themselves with confiscated horses.

Soon afterward, Napoleon overthrew the Kingdom of Spain in a political and military coup; this proved in the long run to be a gigantic blunder. French Imperial troops which were supposed to be reinforcements for Junot's corps seized several key Spanish fortresses during February 1808. Soon there were 118,000 French soldiers in the country. By trickery Napoleon deposed both King Charles IV and his son Prince Ferdinand and replaced them with his brother Joseph Bonaparte. On 2 May 1808, the Dos de Mayo Uprising began and by the end of the month the rebellion was spreading rapidly through Spain. By the beginning of June, Junot's line of communications with France through Spain was severed. The Portuguese revolt started in the north, but on 16 June the rebels in the south captured Maurin and the handful of French soldiers guarding Faro.

On 5 July, Junot sent Margaron with 3,000 troops on an expedition to Tomar and Leiria where he successfully stamped out the revolt. On 25 July, Junot ordered Louis Henri Loison to lead an expedition east toward Elvas. On 29 July, Loison's 8,800 soldiers and eight field guns encountered 2,900 Spanish and Portuguese regulars in the Battle of Évora. Margaron personally led the 86th Line Infantry Regiment in smashing through the Allied center and capturing three cannons. The defeated Allied infantry retreated to Évora which they and some poorly-armed townspeople tried to hold, but the French broke into the town and massacred 2,000 defenders. French casualties were 90 killed and 200 wounded, which they revenged by brutally sacking the town. Three days later, Loison received orders to return to Lisbon to repel a British invasion.

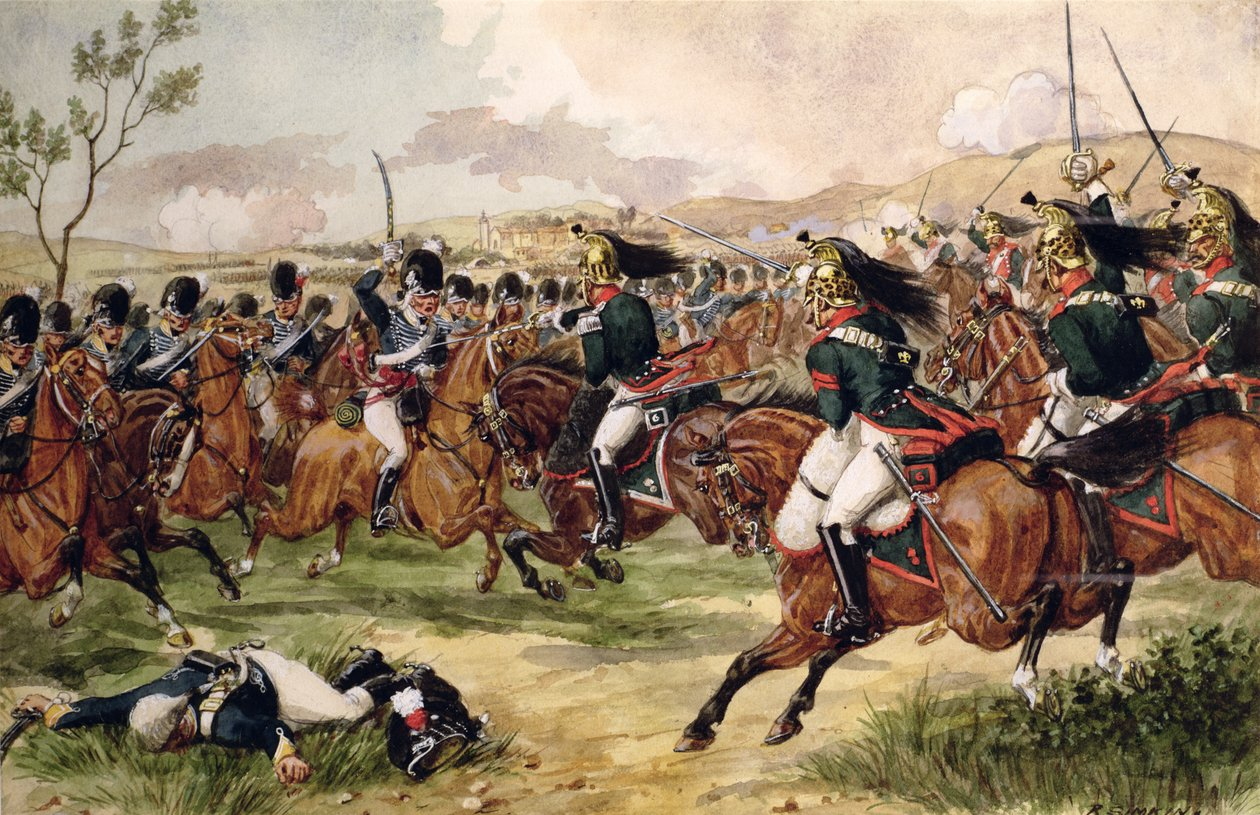
The Battle of Vimeiro

On 2 August 1808 Sir Arthur Wellesley landed in Mondego Bay with 13,536 British troops. These were joined by 2,300 Portuguese soldiers. The expedition was soon reinforced by an additional 4,000 British troops. Wellesley beat 4,765 French troops under Henri François Delaborde on 17 August in the Battle of Roliça. This was followed by the Battle of Vimeiro on 21 August where Wellesley lost 719 casualties out of a strength of 18,669 men. The defeated Junot suffered 1,800 casualties out of a total 16,622 men and lost 12 guns out of 23. Another source estimated Junot's total force at 10,300 infantry, 2,000 cavalry and 700 artillery. Margaron commanded the cavalry, which were all organized as provisional regiments. They were the 3rd, 4th and 5th Dragoons and the 1st Chasseurs à Cheval, plus 100 volunteers.

At Vimeiro, Junot sent the 3rd Dragoons with one of his flanking brigades, leaving Margaron with three cavalry regiments. After his first three frontal attacks failed, Junot sent Kellermann with his grenadier reserve to strike at Vimeiro village. After a hand-to-hand struggle, the grenadiers were beaten and Margaron sent one regiment to cover their retreat. At this moment, 240 troopers of the British 20th Light Dragoons charged, broke through the French cavalry and began cutting down the grenadiers. Excited by their success, the British horsemen got out of control and pressed their charge too far. When Margaron unleashed his last two regiments, the light dragoons were lucky to get away with only 21 killed, including Colonel Taylor, 24 wounded and 11 captured.

=== 1809–1814 ===
In return for surrendering Portugal, the British repatriated Junot and his troops to France. When Junot's force was reassembled as the VIII Corps, it was missing its cavalry because the provisional cavalry units were assigned to their proper regiments. Margaron was assigned to command the cavalry depots in Deux-Sèvres and Charente-Inférieure. He was appointed Baron of the Empire on 29 January 1809. He went to Spain as part of the II Corps in 1809 but returned to France on leave before the end of the year. Between 6 September 1810 and 22 July 1812, he commanded the department of Haute-Loire.

Margaron was transferred to the army in Germany and promoted to general of division on 16 August 1813. During the Battle of Leipzig on 16–19 October 1813 he commanded the 4,820-man garrison of Leipzig, consisting of two brigades supported by two French horse artillery batteries of 12 total guns and a 4-gun half-battery. Annet Morio de L'isle led the French brigade which included the 2nd Battalions of the 96th and 103rd Line Infantry, the 4th Battalion of the 132nd Line and a converged battalion of the 35th/36th Light Infantry. Count Hochberg directed the Grand Duchy of Baden brigade which was made up of one battalion of the 2nd Line Infantry and the Lingg Light Battalion.

== Later career ==
In 1814 after the Bourbon Restoration, Margaron received the Order of Saint-Louis and became inspector general of the Gendarmerie. During the Hundred Days he accepted a position under Napoleon and was put on the retired list on 22 October 1815. However, he was reappointed inspector general of the Gendarmerie on 14 August 1816 and held the post until placed on inactive duty on 3 July 1821. He died at Paris on 16 December 1824 and his name appears on the north side of the Arc de Triomphe.
