= Invasion of Portugal (1807) =

Invasion during the Peninsular War

- Part of the Peninsular War
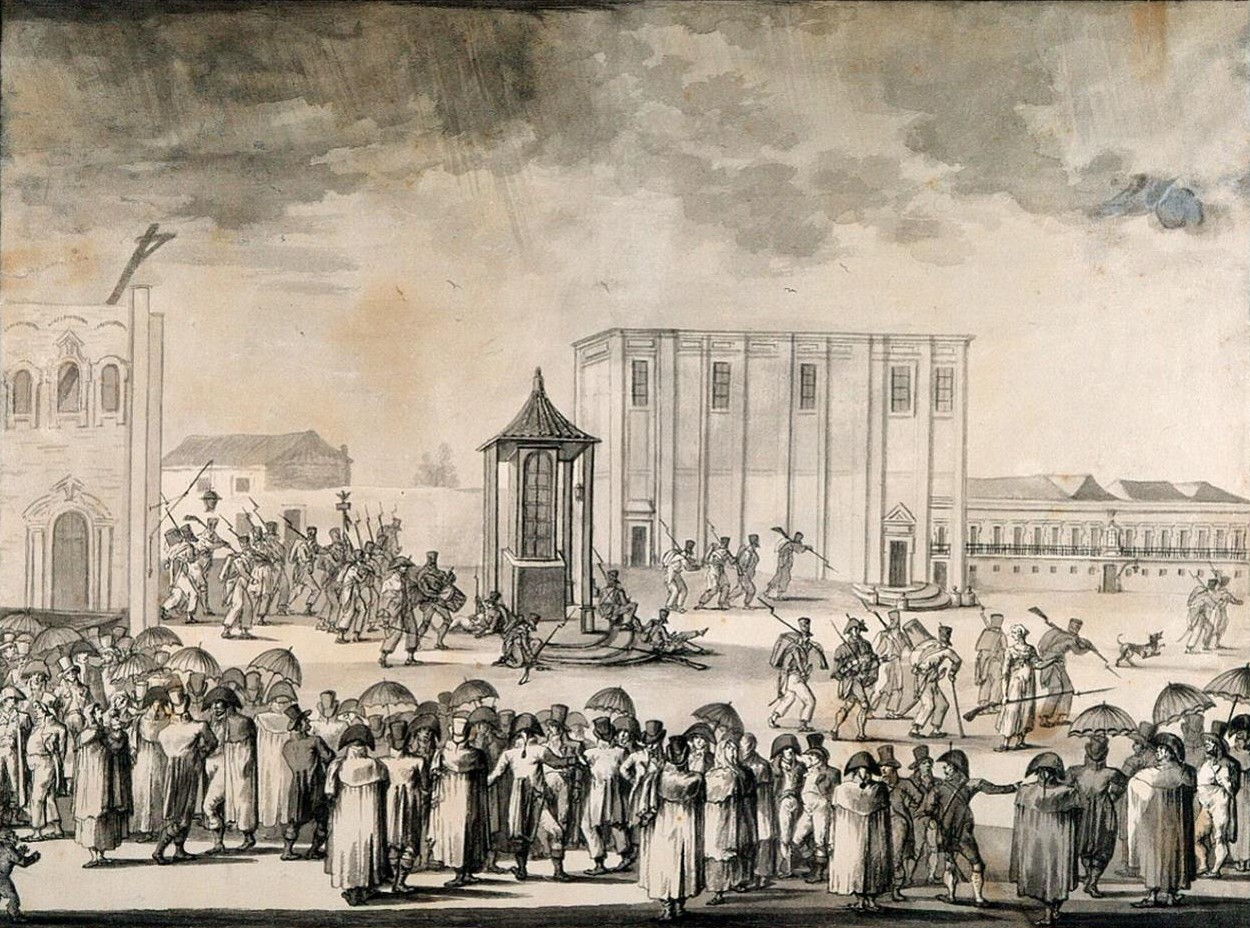
- French troops entering Lisbon on 30 November 1807
Date	19–30 November 1807
Location	Portugal
Result	Franco-Spanish victory
Territorial changes	Portuguese mainland under joint Franco-Spanish occupation

Belligerents
French Empire; Kingdom of Spain	Kingdom of Portugal

Commanders and leaders
(First French Empire) Jean-Andoche Junot	Prince Regent João

Strength
France: 25,918; Spain: 25,500; Total: 51,418	20,000

Peninsular war: Portugal
1807 1808 1809 1810 1811

French and Spanish forces invaded Portugal from 19–30 November 1807 during the Napoleonic Wars, sparking the Peninsular War. The Franco-Spanish invasion force was led by General Jean-Andoche Junot, while the Portuguese were under the nominal command of Prince Regent John, the future King John VI of Portugal. French and Spanish troops swiftly occupied the country in the face of little resistance due to the poor state of the Portuguese military.

Prior to the invasion, Napoleon had issued an ultimatum to the Portuguese government, which reluctantly acceded to most of his demands. Nevertheless, Napoleon ordered Junot to invade Portugal together with three Spanish Army divisions. Paralyzed by fear and indecision, the Portuguese authorities offered no resistance. Junot's troops occupied Lisbon on 30 November 1807, only to find that John and many of the leading families had escaped to Brazil aboard an Anglo-Portuguese fleet. The French quickly occupied the entire country and appropriated or disbanded the Portuguese Army. The following year saw the Portuguese revolt against their French occupiers, leading to the Battle of Évora in July 1808.

== Background ==
When the Treaties of Tilsit ended the War of the Fourth Coalition, Emperor Napoleon of France had already expressed irritation that Portugal was open to trade with the United Kingdom. Napoleon's ire was provoked because Portugal was Britain's oldest ally in Europe, Britain was finding new opportunities for trade with Portugal's colony in Brazil, the Royal Navy often used Lisbon's port in its operations against France, and he wished to seize Portugal's fleet. Furthermore, Crown Prince John, prince regent for his mentally ill mother Queen Maria I, had failed to comply with the Emperor's Continental System that excluded British trade. In addition, the seizure of Portugal would fit neatly into Napoleon's future designs against Spain.

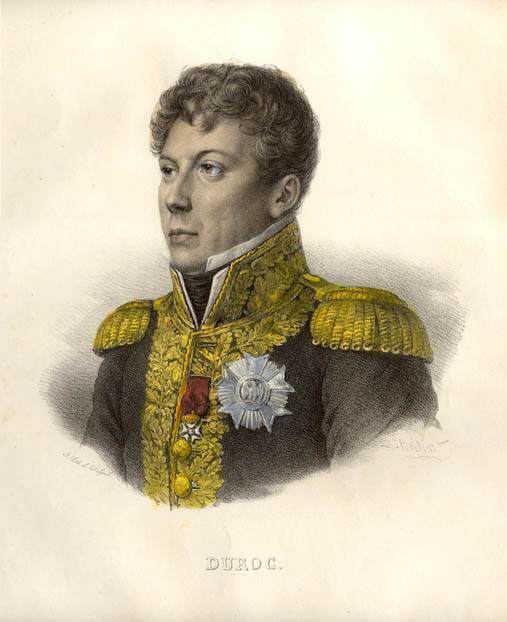
Portrait illustration of French marshal Géraud Duroc.

On 19 July 1807, Napoleon ordered his Portuguese ambassador to inform that country to close its ports to British shipping by 1 September. On 2 August the 1st Corps of the Gironde Army of Observation was officially brought into being, with General of Division Jean-Andoche Junot in command. Shortly afterward, the First French Empire placed all Portuguese shipping in its ports under embargo. On 23 September, the Emperor made his intentions clear when he publicly threatened to depose the Braganzas in front of the Portuguese minister to France.

Meanwhile, on 12 August 1807 the French and Spanish ambassadors delivered their ultimata to the Prince Regent of Portugal. The notes required that John must declare war on Great Britain, put his fleet at France and Spain's disposal, seize all British trade in his ports, and put all British subjects under arrest. John agreed to suspend diplomatic relations with Britain and close his ports, but he shrank from seizing British merchants and their goods. This was deemed inadequate by Napoleon and the French and Spanish ambassadors requested their passports and left the country on 30 September.

On 12 October, Junot's corps began crossing the Bidasoa River into Spain at Irun. Soon after this event, the secret Treaty of Fontainebleau was signed between France and Spain. The document was drawn up by Napoleon's marshal of the palace Géraud Duroc and Eugenio Izquierdo, an agent for Manuel de Godoy, Prince of the Peace. The treaty proposed to carve up Portugal into three entities. Porto (Oporto) and the northern part was to become the Kingdom of Northern Lusitania under Charles Louis of Etruria. The southern portion would fall to Godoy as the Principality of the Algarves. The rump of the country, centered on Lisbon, was to be administered by the French. It is probable that Napoleon never had any intention of carrying out the treaty's provisions. Aside from his desire to occupy Portugal, his real purpose may have been to introduce large French forces into Spain in order to facilitate its subsequent takeover.

== Forces ==
=== French ===
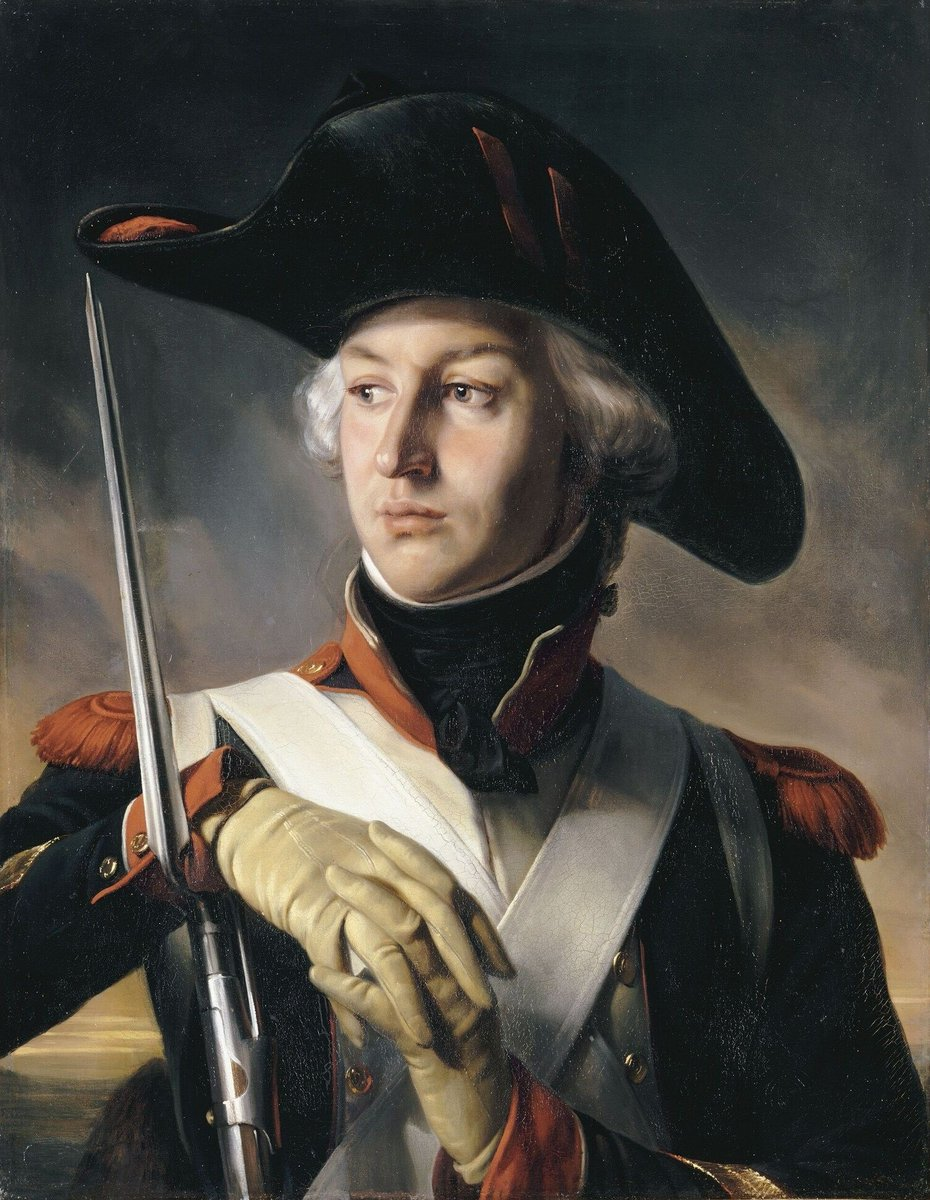
Portrait of Jean-Andoche Junot as a young sergeant of grenadiers in 1792.

Junot was selected because he had served as Portugal's ambassador in 1805. He was known as a good fighter and an active officer, but he possessed only ordinary talents as a strategist and a general. Napoleon promised his subordinate a dukedom and a marshal's baton if his assignment was carried out with total success.

Junot's 24,918-man corps consisted of one cavalry division under General of Division François Étienne de Kellermann and three infantry divisions under Generals of Division Henri François Delaborde, Louis Henri Loison, and Jean-Pierre Travot. Junot's chief of staff was General of Brigade Paul Thiébault. Kellermann's 1,754-strong division was made up of one squadron each of the 26th Chasseurs à Cheval (244), 1st Dragoon (261), 3rd Dragoon (236), 4th Dragoon (262), 5th Dragoon (249), 9th Dragoon (257), and 15th Dragoon (245) Regiments. The cavalry was divided into two brigades under Generals of Brigade Pierre Margaron and Antoine Maurin.

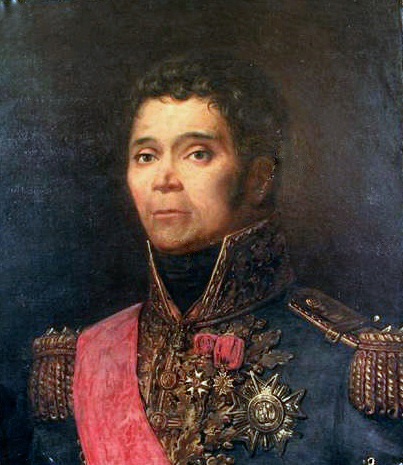
Portrait of François de Kellermann by an unknown artist.

Delaborde's 7,848-man 1st Division included the 1st Battalion of the 4th Swiss Regiment (1,190) and six French battalions. These were the 3rd Battalion of the 15th Line Infantry Regiment (1,033), the 2nd Battalion of the 47th Line (1,210), the 1st and 2nd Battalions of the 70th Line (2,299), and the 1st and 2nd Battalions of the 86th Line (2,116). Delaborde's brigades were led by Generals of Brigade Jean-Jacques Avril and Antoine François Brenier de Montmorand. Loison's 8,481-strong 2nd Division was made up of the 2nd Battalion of the 2nd Swiss Regiment (755) and the 3rd Battalions of the remaining six French units. These were the 2nd Light Infantry Regiment (1,255), 4th Light (1,196), 12th Light (1,302), 15th Light (1,314), 32nd Line (1,265), and 58th Line (1,394). Loison's brigadiers were Generals of Brigade Hugues Charlot and Jean Guillaume Barthélemy Thomières.

Travot's 5,538-man 3rd Division comprised the Hanoverian Legion (703) and seven French battalions. These were the 1st Battalion of the Légion du Midi (797), the 3rd and 4th Battalions of the 66th Line Infantry Regiment (1,004), and the 3rd Battalions of the 31st Light (653), 32nd Light (983), 26th Line (537), and 82nd Line (861). Travot's two brigades were led by General of Brigade Louis Fuzier and Jean François Graindorge. Artillerymen, sappers, train drivers, and other personnel numbered 1,297. Out of the 30,000 men who eventually served in Junot's army, only about 17,000 were veterans.

=== Spanish ===
According to the Treaty of Fontainebleau, Junot's invasion force was to be supported by 25,500 men in three Spanish columns. General Francisco Taranco y Llano and 6,500 troops were ordered to march from Vigo to seize Porto in the north. Captain General Solano would advance from Badajoz with 9,500 soldiers to capture Elvas and its fortress. General Juan Carrafa and 9,500 men were instructed to assemble at Salamanca and Ciudad Rodrigo and cooperate with Junot's main force.

=== Portuguese ===
Portrait of Prince Regent John and his wife ca. 1815.

The Portuguese army had been modernized in 1762 by William, Count of Schaumburg-Lippe but the army's administration soon became corrupt. Colonels and captains collected pay and supplies from the government for their soldiers. But the temptation to profit from this arrangement proved irresistible. The poorly paid officers often pocketed funds for soldiers who were on the muster rolls but absent or non-existent. Graft and embezzlement led to understrength units, cavalrymen without horses, and regimental depots without supplies.

During the brief War of the Oranges in 1801 the weakness of the Portuguese army became manifest. In the wake of that conflict, each of the twenty-four line infantry regiments had a second battalion added. The number of companies per battalion was reduced from seven to five, but company strength was raised from 116 to 150 soldiers. The twelve regiments of line cavalry were each increased to 470 troopers and their cuirasses discarded. The number of 989-man artillery regiments was increased from three to four while ten fortress artillery companies were established. The Portuguese army's 48,396-man nominal strength included 36,000 line infantrymen, 5,640 line cavalrymen, 3,956 artillerists, 1,300 fortress gunners, and 1,500 legionnaires and engineers. But after 1801, the previous system of abuses continued so that the army may have numbered as few as 20,000 men in 1807.

In 1807 the Portuguese infantry was organized into 27 regiments, of which three were colonial. The remaining 24 were titled Lippe, Albuquerque, Minas, 1st Armada, 2nd Armada, Cascaes, Setubal, Peniche, 1st Elvas, 2nd Elvas, Serpa, 1st Olivença, 2nd Olivença, Campo Major, Castello de Vide, Lagos, Faro, 1st Oporto, 2nd Oporto, Viana, Valença, Almeida, Gena Major, and Bragança. There was an additional unit of light infantry known as the D'Alorna Legion. The twelve regiments of Portuguese cavalry originally had cuirassier equipment. These regiments were those of Caés, Alcantara, Mecklenburg, Elvas, Évora, Moira, Olivença, Almeida, Castello Branco, Miranda, Chaves, and Bragança. The D'Alorna Legion also had a cavalry contingent which was fitted out in hussar uniforms.

== Invasion ==
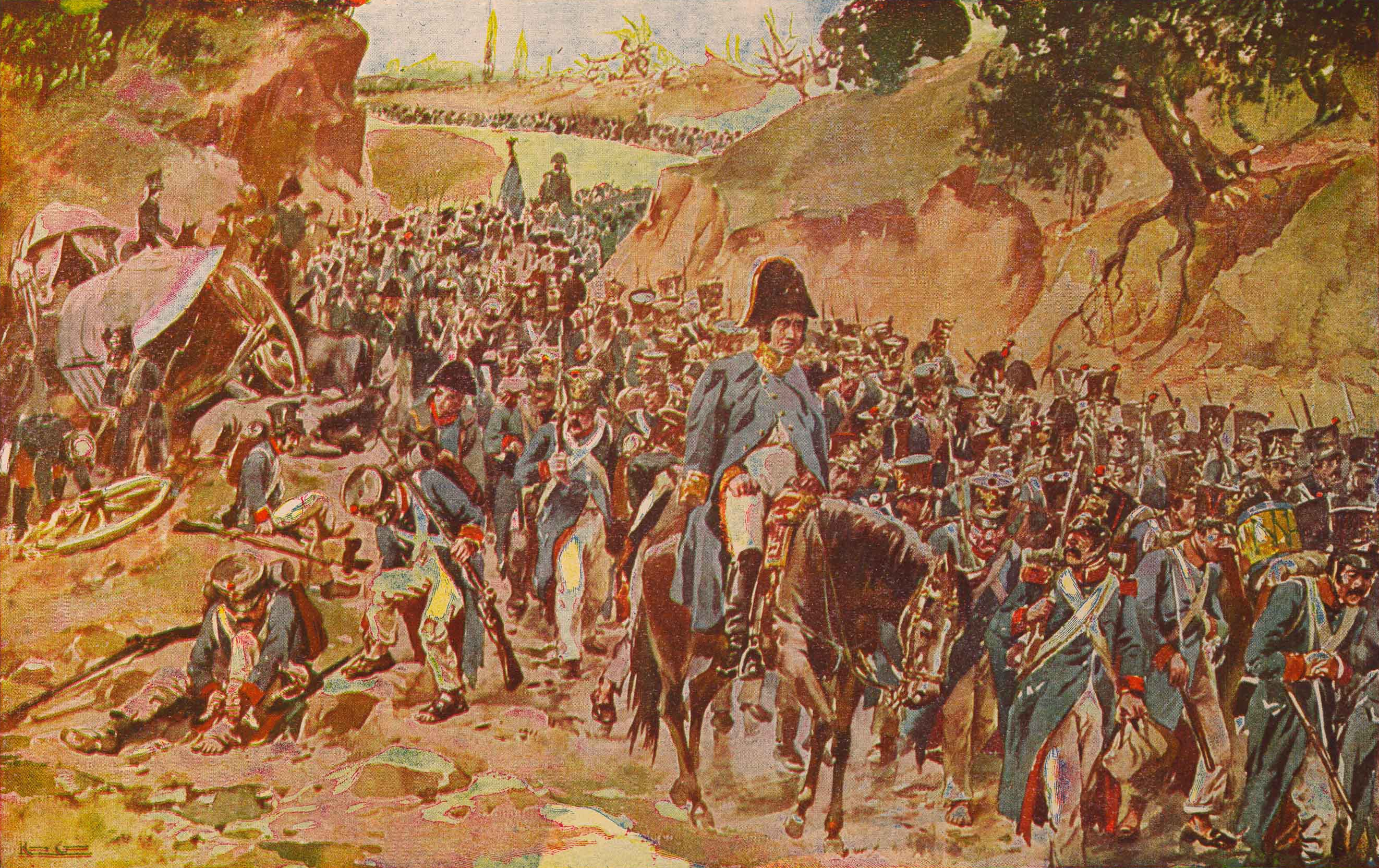
Junot's corps on the march during the invasion

On 12 November 1807, Junot's corps entered Salamanca in western Spain after marching about 300 miles (483 km) in 25 days. Unknown to their Spanish allies, the French engineers were secretly taking notes about all fortresses and strategic points on their line of march. On that day, Junot received new orders urging him to hurry. The normal invasion route is a corridor 200 miles (322 km) in length via Almeida and Coimbra. Instead, Junot was instructed to move west from Alcántara along the Tagus valley to Portugal, a distance of only 120 miles (193 km). Anxious that Britain might intervene in Portugal or that the Portuguese might resist, Napoleon decided to speed up the invasion timetable.

Unfortunately for Junot and his soldiers, the new route passed through an area with few inhabitants and very poor roads. Nevertheless, Napoleon declared, "I will not have the march of the army delayed for a single day. 20,000 men can feed themselves anywhere, even in a desert." The march south from Ciudad Rodrigo to Alcántara via the Perales Pass was accomplished in five days in the cold rain. On this rough road through hills and ravines, half of the army's horses died, one-quarter of the soldiers straggled, and all but six artillery pieces were left behind. At Alcántara, Junot appropriated ammunition and provisions from the Spanish troops guarding the bridge across the Tagus.

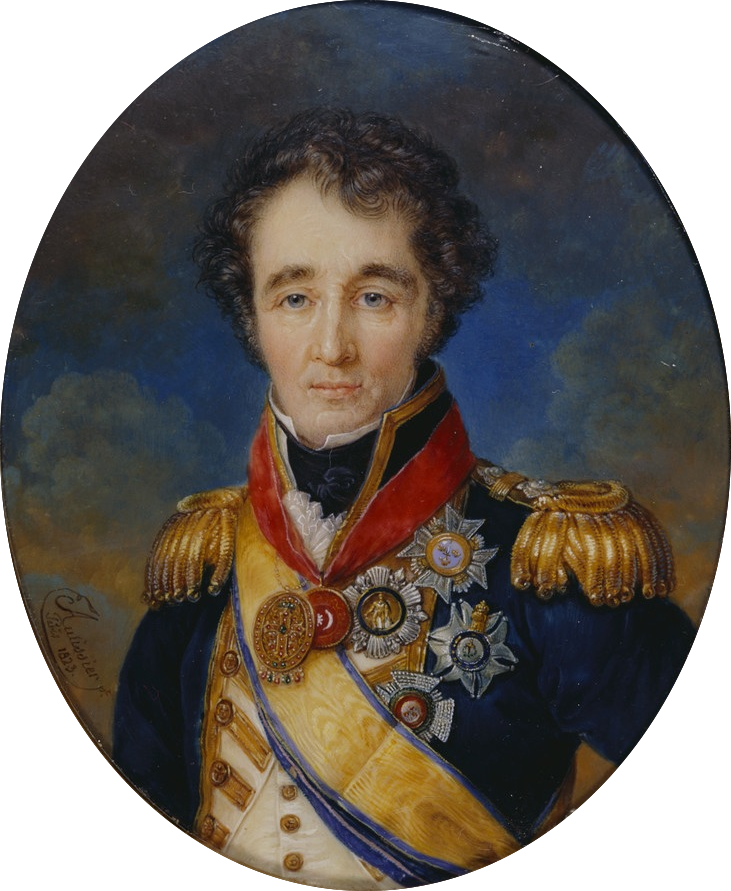
Portrait of Admiral Sir Sidney Smith in 1823.

On 19 November 1807, Junot set out for Lisbon. As bad as the roads were on the Spanish side of the border, those in Portugal were worse. The road along the Tagus valley was a mere track through a rocky wilderness, with Castelo Branco being the only substantial town in the area. Amid the continual rain, the advance guard limped into Abrantes on 23 November. The rear of the corps closed up on 26 November. By this time, the only guns with the column were four Spanish horse artillery pieces, while half of the soldiers were straggling or marauding.

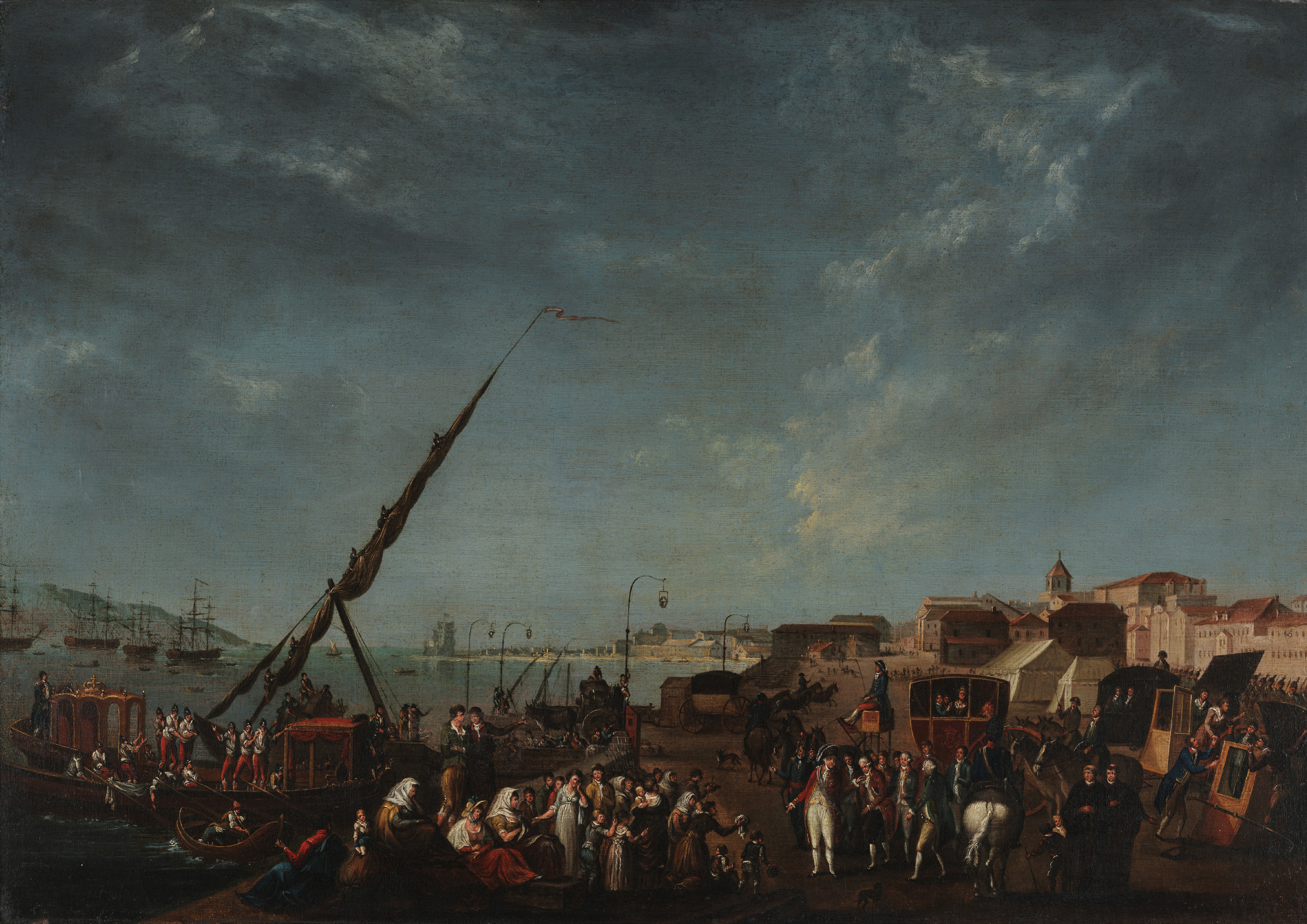
Painting of John and his family escaping by sea to Brazil

Meanwhile, the Portuguese authorities were in a state of panic. At first, the Prince Regent had been convinced that Napoleon did not really want to depose him. As the Emperor's hostile intentions became more clear, John declared war on the United Kingdom on 20 October and seized the few remaining British subjects on 8 November. Nevertheless, disturbing reports began to arrive in Lisbon of Junot's march across Spain. Despite these events, John's government failed to mobilize the Portuguese regular army or call out the militia to defend the realm. Soon after, Admiral Sidney Smith appeared off Lisbon with a British squadron and declared that the port was under blockade. The British were worried about the presence in Lisbon of a Russian squadron under Admiral Dmitry Senyavin and alarmed that the Portuguese fleet in Lisbon might fall into Napoleon's hands, which would mean that fourteen ships of the line, eleven frigates, and seven smaller vessels would have joined the French Navy.

Junot was met at Abrantes by an emissary from the Prince Regent. Hoping to avert a French occupation, the diplomat offered to submit under various degrading terms. Understanding that the Portuguese were prostrate, Junot organized four battalions made up of his best remaining men and set out for Lisbon, which was still 75 miles (121 km) away. Without a single cannon or cavalryman, 1,500 French troops staggered into Lisbon on 30 November, their cartridges soaked and their uniforms in tatters. There was no opposition. It took ten days for all of Junot's infantry to arrive and even longer for his artillery to show up. His cavalrymen immediately began remounting themselves with horses seized from the local people.

Though the French occupied Lisbon without firing a shot, their quarry had escaped. As Junot's army loomed closer, the Prince Regent dithered between offering complete submission and fleeing to Brazil. Finally, Admiral Smith produced a 13 October edition of the Paris Le Moniteur Universel which declared that the House of Braganza had been deposed. At this, John made up his mind to escape. He loaded his family, courtiers, state papers, and treasure aboard the fleet. He was joined in flight by many nobles, merchants, and others. With fifteen warships and more than twenty transports, the fleet of refugees weighed anchor on 29 November and set sail for the colony of Brazil. The flight had been so chaotic that fourteen carts loaded with treasure were left behind on the docks.

== Occupation ==
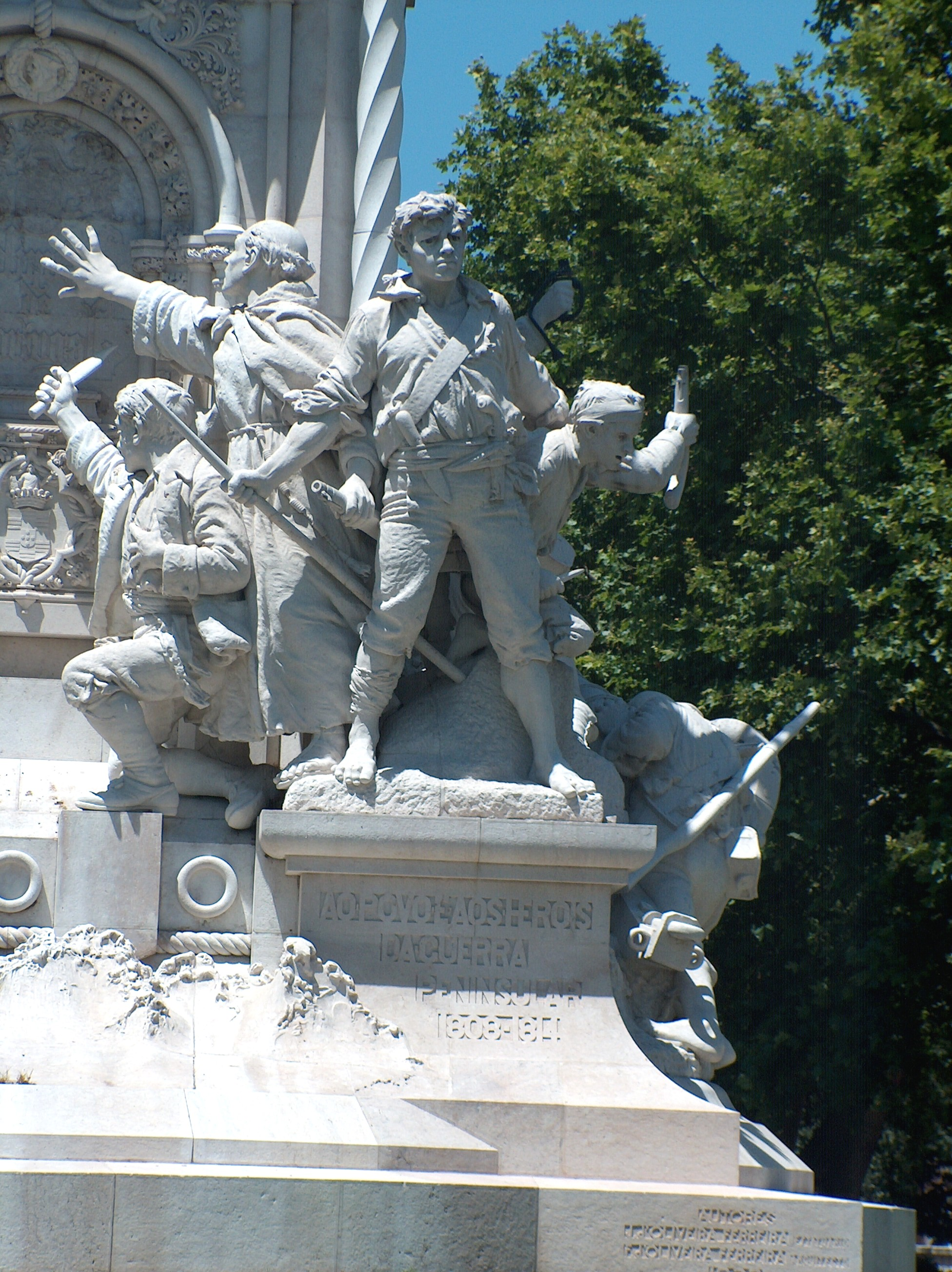
Detail of the monument dedicated to the heroes of the Peninsular War, Lisbon

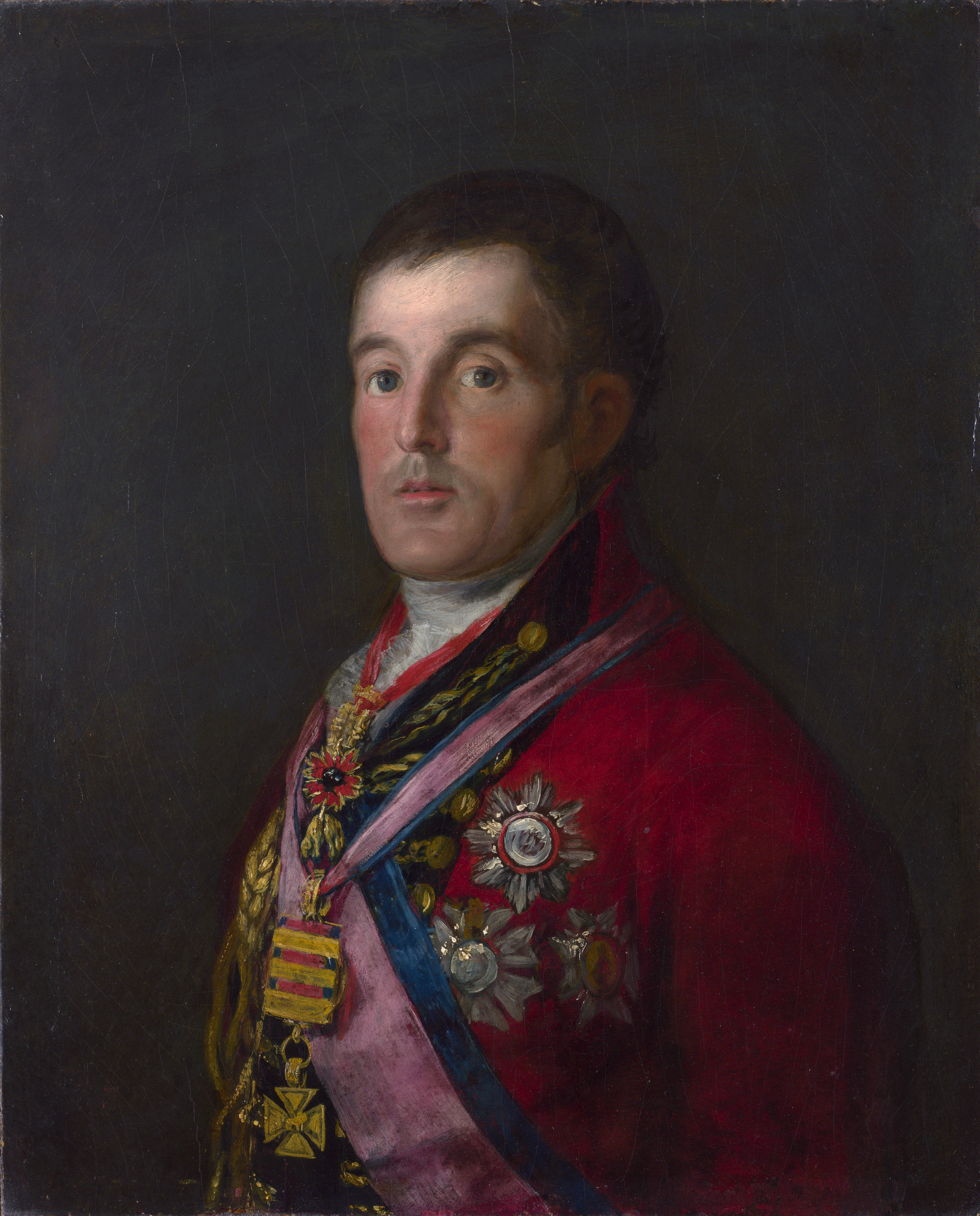
Portrait of Arthur Wellesley, ca. 1813.

Solano's Spanish column belatedly invaded Portugal on 2 December 1807 while Taranco occupied Porto on 13 December. The only resistance was offered by the governor of Valença, who refused to open his gates to the northern column. He only caved in when he found that Lisbon had fallen and the Prince Regent had fled. While the Portuguese civil authorities were generally subservient toward their occupiers, the common people were angry. When Junot raised the French flag on Lisbon's public buildings on 13 December, a riot broke out. Mounted troops were sent into the streets to disperse the mob with force. As one of his first acts, Junot disbanded the Portuguese army by discharging all its soldiers with less than one year and more than six years of service. The remainder were assigned to nine new units and most were marched to northern Germany to perform garrison duty. Two Portuguese units were employed by the French in the 2 August 1808 assault during the First Siege of Zaragoza. They were 265 men of the 5th Infantry and 288 men of the Caçadores. The Portuguese Legion fought at the Battle of Wagram in July 1809 under the command of General Carcôme Lobo. The Legion counted 1,471 infantry in three battalions and 133 cavalry in two squadrons. In 1812 the Portuguese troops were reorganized into three regiments and participated in the French invasion of Russia. Few of these unlucky men survived the campaign.

Junot did his best to calm the situation by trying to keep his troops under control. However, his task was undercut by new orders from Napoleon. Junot was instructed to seize the property of the 15,000 persons who had fled to Brazil and to levy a 100 million franc fine on the nation. As it happened, the refugees had carried off almost half of the specie in Portugal and the French were barely able to raise enough money to maintain the occupation army. Nevertheless, the harsh taxes caused bitter resentment among the population. By January 1808 there were executions of persons who resisted the exactions of the French. The situation was dangerous, but most of the country's leaders had gone to Brazil, leaving no one to lead an insurrection.

By the following spring, the occupation army numbered 25,000 active soldiers, thanks to the approximately 4,000 reinforcements that arrived in early 1808. The situation changed after the Spanish Dos de Mayo Uprising. Junot soon found that all communications with Paris were cut off by the Spanish revolt. On 6 June 1808, news of the rebellion reached Porto where General Domingo Belestá was stationed with 6,000 Spanish troops, Taranco having died during the winter. After seizing General of Division François Jean Baptiste Quesnel and his 30-man escort, Belesta marched his troops away to join the armies fighting the French. Between 9 and 12 June, northwest Portugal erupted in revolt.

== Aftermath ==
The next action was the Battle of Évora on 29 July 1808.

British intervention occurred in early August when Lieutenant General Sir Arthur Wellesley and 16,000 soldiers landed in Mondego Bay leading to the subsequent Battle of Roliça and the Battle of Vimeiro.

== See also ==
- French invasions of Portugal
- Timeline of the Peninsular War
- Secret Convention on the Transfer of the Portuguese monarchy to Brazil

== Notes ==
Preceded by Battle of Copenhagen (1807)	Napoleonic Wars; Invasion of Portugal (1807)	Succeeded by Dos de Mayo Uprising
