= Secret Convention on the Transfer of the Portuguese monarchy to Brazil =

Convention on the Transfer of the Portuguese monarchy to Brazil
Secret convention on the transfer to Brazil of the seat of the Portuguese monarchy and temporary occupation of Madeira Island by British troops
- Context: Peninsular War
- Signed: 22 October 1807
- Location: London
- Parties: Portugal; United Kingdom

The Secret Convention on the Transfer of the Portuguese monarchy to Brazil, also called "Secret Convention on the transfer to Brazil of the seat of the Portuguese monarchy and temporary occupation of Madeira Island by British troops", was an international treaty between the Kingdom of Portugal and United Kingdom of Great Britain and Ireland on October 22, 1807. It was signed in London, taking place in the context of the Napoleonic Wars. More specifically, it was agreed upon just a few days before the first invasion of Portugal in the Peninsular War, when French troops were already approaching the Portuguese borders through Spanish territory. Later, Portuguese aspirations became reality with the support of the British Royal Navy during the transfer of the Portuguese court to Brazil, and Portugal complied with British requirements by opening the Brazilian ports to their goods and allowing the occupation of Madeira by Britain.
