= Jean François Graindorge =

French general

- Born: 1 July 1770; Saint-Pois, Normandy, France
- Died: 1 October 1810 (aged 40) Carquejo, Portugal
- Allegiance: France
- Branch: Infantry
- Service years: 1791–1810
- Rank: General of Brigade
- Conflicts: French Revolutionary Wars; Flanders Campaign; Battle of Neuwied; Napoleonic Wars; Battle of Dürrenstein; Battle of Saalfeld; Battle of Jena; Battle of Pułtusk; Battle of Ostrołęka; Invasion of Portugal; Battle of Bussaco
- Awards: Légion d'Honneur, CC 1804
- Other work: Baron of the Empire, 1809

Jean-François, baron Graindorge (French pronunciation: [ʒɑ̃ fʁɑ̃swa ɡʁɛ̃dɔʁʒ]; 1 July 1770 – 1 October 1810) became a brigade commander during the Napoleonic Wars and was mortally wounded while leading his troops against the British at the Battle of Bussaco in Portugal. His surname is one of the names inscribed under the Arc de Triomphe, on Column 38.

== Career ==
On 1 July 1770 Graindorge was born at Saint-Pois in the province of Normandy in France. He joined the French army on 20 September 1791 as a lieutenant of the 1st Orne Volunteer Battalion. This unit soon became part of the 37th Line Infantry Demi-Brigade and fought with the Army of the North in 1792 and 1793. Graindorge was wounded by a bullet in the right thigh near Maubeuge on 11 June 1792.
