= Francisco de Paula Leite de Sousa, 1st Viscount of Veiros =

Portuguese military officer

His Lordship The Viscount of Veiros
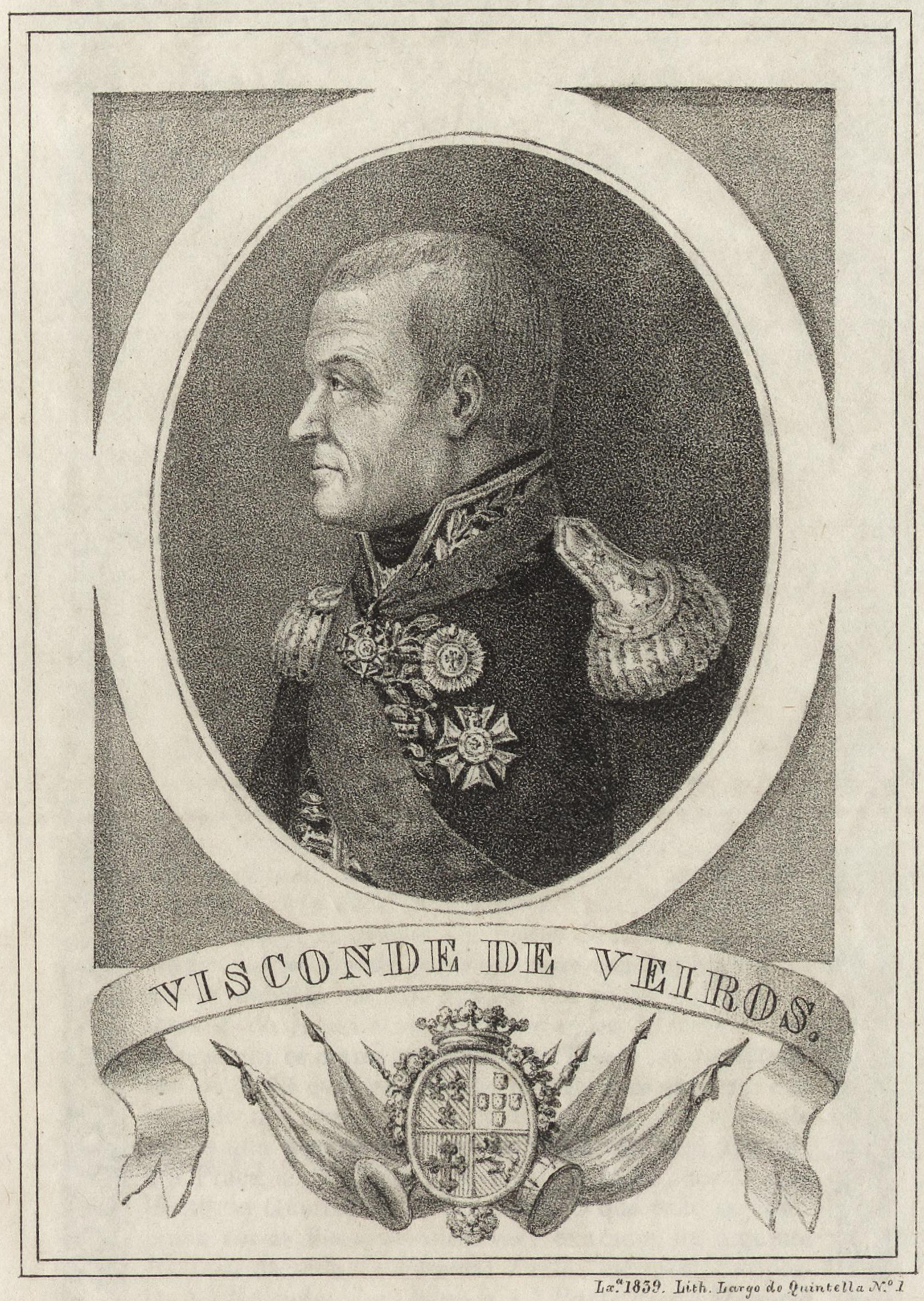
- The Viscount of Veiros in a 19th-century lithographic print
- Born: 7 March 1747; Santarém, Portugal
- Died: 6 July 1833 (aged 86); Lisbon, Portugal
- Military career
- Allegiance: Portugal
- Service years: 1762–c. 1820s–1830s

Francisco de Paula Leite de Sousa, Viscount of Veiros (7 March 1747 – 6 July 1833) was a Portuguese military officer.

He served both the Royal Portuguese Army and Navy.

According to Oman (1903), of all the Portuguese commanders, Leite was the one whom Wellington most trusted and "every British narrator of the war who came in contact with him has a word of praise in his behalf".

== Early life ==
Francisco de Paula Leite de Sousa was born on 7 March 1747 in Santarém, Portugal, the son of Lieutenant General José Leite de Sousa, a counsellor of King Joseph I, and Maria Antónia Veríssima de Foios Ferrão de Castelo Branco. He enlisted as a soldier in the Cais Cavalry Regiment on 5 March 1762.

== Peninsular War ==
=== Évora (1808) ===
Following his Invasion of Portugal (1807) and wishing to reopen his communications with Elvas, and to keep the way clear towards Badajoz, the direction in which he would have to retreat, if he had to evacuate Lisbon, Junot sent General Loison at the head of a strong flying column—seven and a half battalions, two regiments of dragoons, and eight guns—over 7,000 men in all.

On reaching Évora, the capital of the Alentejo on 29 July, Loison was surprised to find General Leite ready for battle in the open. Leite had been able to organize a battalion and a half of infantry and 120 horse and had been joined by the Spanish Colonel Moretti, from Badajoz, with about the same number of foot, plus the Hussars of Maria Luisa regiment of regular cavalry and seven guns: 3,000 men in total, while a multitude of peasants and citizens manned the walls of the town.

Despite Leite's defeat at Évora, Wellington's plans for the winter of 1809-10 included giving Leite the most important command of Portuguese troops; that of the strongest fortress of Portugal, Elvas, together with the 6,000 men of its garrison (of whom half were regulars). By 1810, this force had increased to 8,000 men, comprising two regiments of regulars and five of militia.
