= Perales del Puerto =

Coordinates: 40°09′N 6°41′W

Perales del Puerto, Spain
- municipality
- Flag Coat of arms
- Interactive map of Perales del Puerto, Spain
- Country: Spain
- Autonomous community: Extremadura
- Province: Cáceres
- Municipality: Perales del Puerto

Area
  - Total: 36 km^{2} (14 sq mi)

Population (2025-01-01)
  - Total: 874
  - Density: 24/km^{2} (63/sq mi)
- Time zone: UTC+1 (CET)
  - Summer (DST): UTC+2 (CEST)

Perales del Puerto is a municipality located in the province of Cáceres, Extremadura, Spain. According to the 2006 census (INE), the municipality has a population of 992 inhabitants.

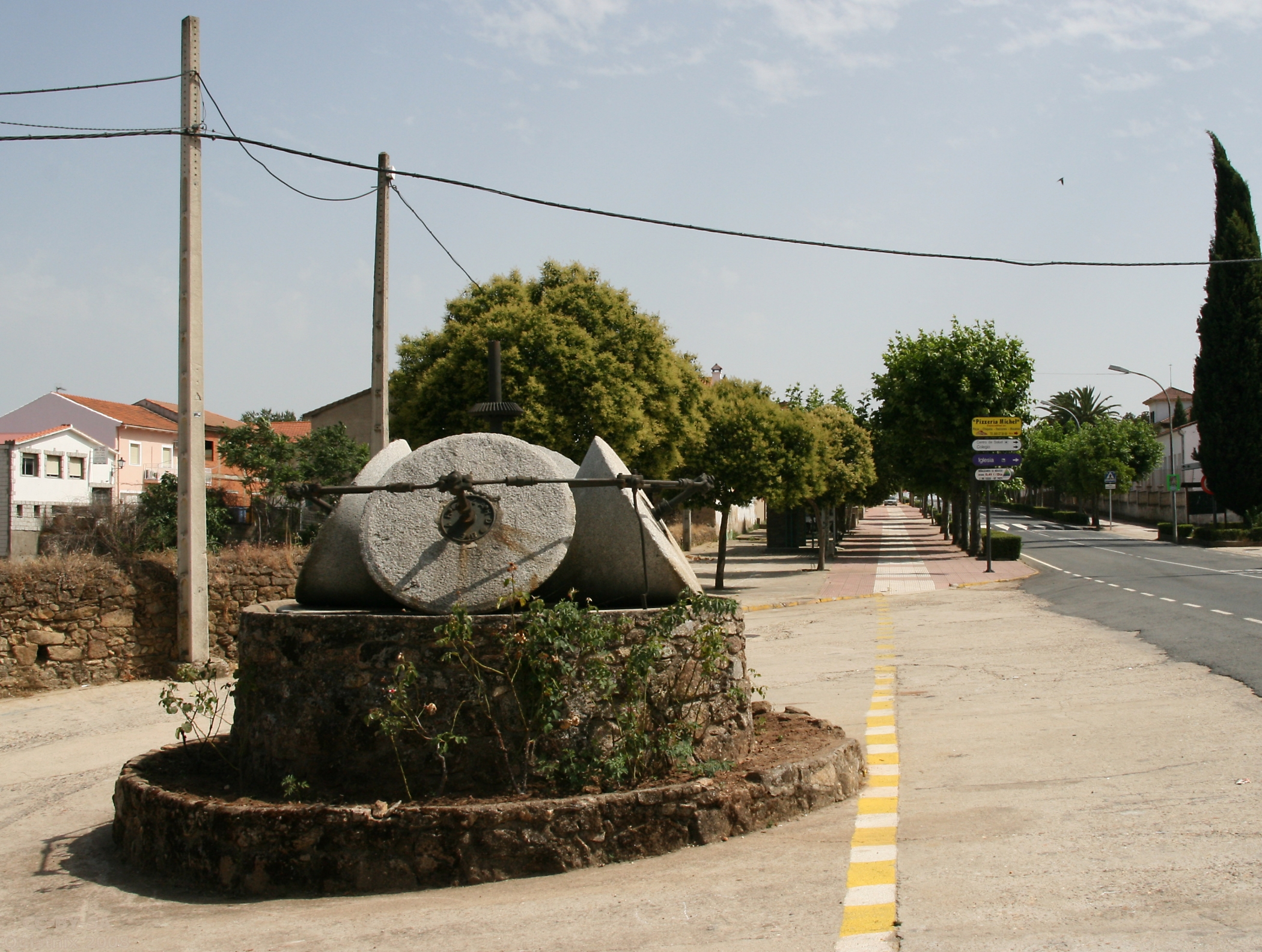
Street of Perales del Puerto with grinding stones from a former oil mill

== See also ==
- List of municipalities in Cáceres
