= Saint-Pois =

- Commune
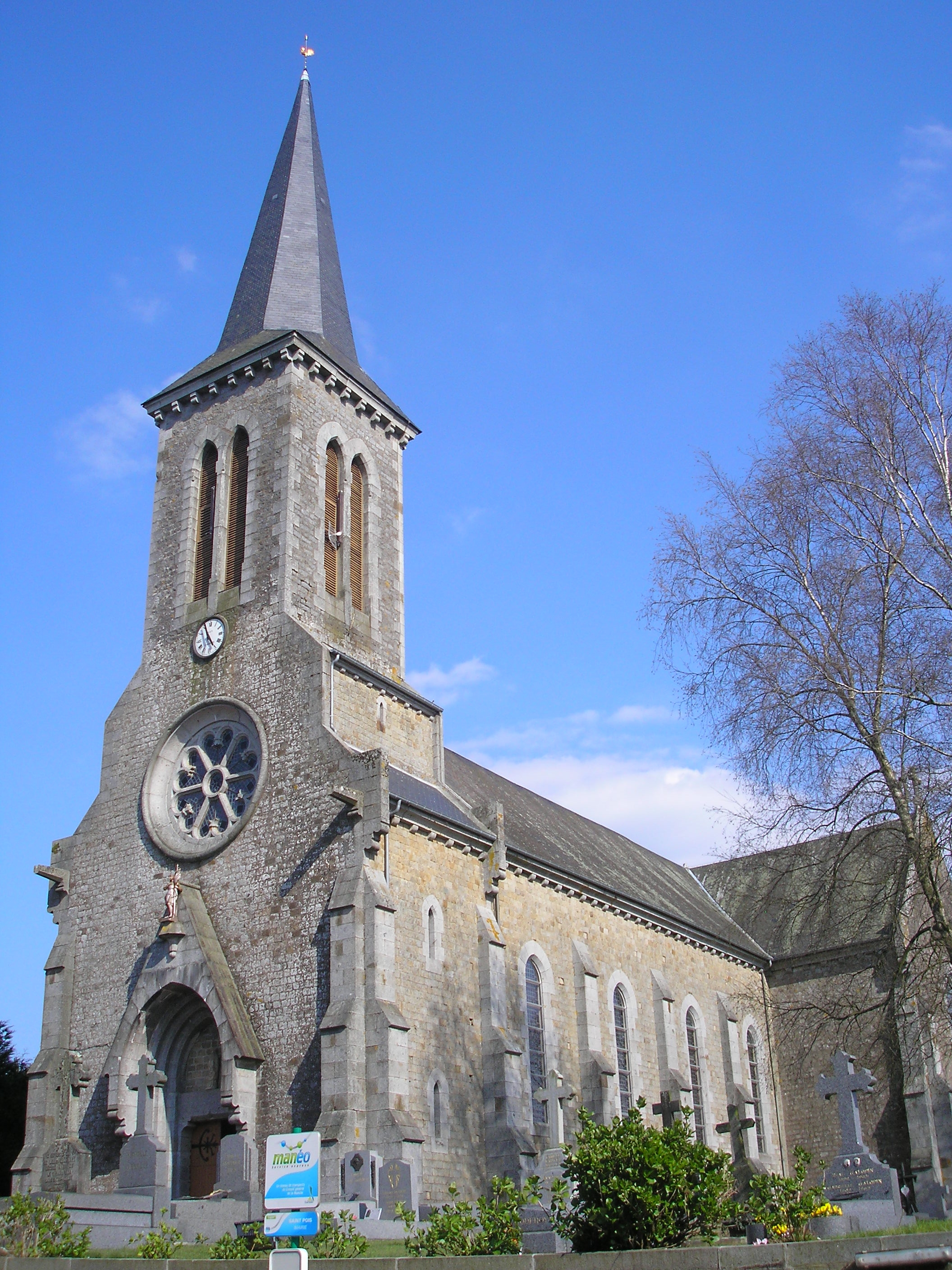
- The church

- Coat of arms
- Location of Saint-Pois
- Location within France Location within Normandy
- Coordinates: 48°45′01″N 1°03′56″W
- Country: France
- Region: Normandy
- Department: Manche
- Arrondissement: Avranches
- Canton: Villedieu-les-Poêles-Rouffigny

Government
  - Mayor (2020–2026): Yves Lecourt
- Area^{1}: 7.78 km^{2} (3.00 sq mi)
- Elevation: 180 m (590 ft)
- Highest elevation: 289 m (948 ft)
- Lowest elevation: 73 m (240 ft)
- Population (2023): 454
  - Density: 58.4/km^{2} (151/sq mi)
- Time zone: UTC+01:00 (CET)
  - Summer (DST): UTC+02:00 (CEST)
- INSEE/Postal code: 50542 /50670
- ^{1} French Land Register data, which excludes lakes, ponds, glaciers > 1 km^{2} (0.386 sq mi or 247 acres) and river estuaries.

Saint-Pois (French pronunciation: [sɛ̃ pwa]) is a commune in the Manche department in Normandy in north-western France.

== See also ==
- Communes of the Manche department
