= Graham Moore =

Graham Moore may refer to:

- Graham Moore (Royal Navy officer) (1764–1843), Royal Navy admiral
  - Graham Moore Bay, an Arctic waterway in Qikiqtaaluk Region, Nunavut, Canada
  - Cape Graham Moore, an uninhabited headland on Bylot Island in the Qikiqtaaluk Region of Nunavut, Canada
  - Sir Graham Moore Islands (Nunavut), in the Canadian Arctic
  - Sir Graham Moore Islands (Western Australia)
    - Sir Graham Moore Island (Western Australia)
- Graham Moore (footballer) (1941–2016), Welsh football player
- Graham Moore (rugby union) (1923–1991), New Zealand rugby union player
- Graham Moore (scientist) (born 1958), British biologist
- Graham Moore (writer) (born 1981), American screenwriter and novelist
- Graham Moore (racing driver), Australian racing car driver

== See also ==
- Graham (disambiguation)
- Moore (disambiguation)
- Sir Graham Moore Islands (disambiguation)
