= Philippine dynasty =

1581–1640 line of Portuguese kings

- 1581–1640
Second Interregnum	Restoration Era
- The coat of arms of Spain between Philip II of Spain's claim to the Portuguese throne in 1580 until Charles II's renunciation of it in the 1668 Treaty of Lisbon.
- Monarch(s): Philip I Philip II; Philip III
- Leaders: 3rd Duke of Alba; 7th Duke of Braganza; 8th Duke of Braganza

The Philippine dynasty (Portuguese: Dinastia Filipina), also known as the Third Dynasty of Portugal (Portuguese: Terceira Dinastia) is the name given to the House of Habsburg (Portuguese: Casa de Habsburgo, Casa da Áustria) in the context of its rule of Portugal between 1581 and 1640, during which Portugal was one of the many possessions of the Spanish Monarchy in what has been dubbed by historians as the "Iberian Union". It consisted of three kings: Philip I (the dynasty's founder and namesake per Portuguese historiographical tradition), Philip II and Philip III.

The history of Portugal from the 1580 succession crisis to the House of Braganza monarchs was a period of transition. At its beginning, under the House of Aviz, the Portuguese Empire spice trade was near its height. It continued to enjoy widespread influence after Vasco da Gama reached the East Indies by sailing around Africa in 1497–1498. Vasco da Gama's achievement completed the exploratory efforts inaugurated by Henry the Navigator, and opened an oceanic route for the profitable spice trade into Europe that bypassed the Middle East.

Throughout the 17th century, the increasing predations and beleaguering of Portuguese trading posts in the East by the Dutch, English and French, and their rapidly growing intrusion into the Atlantic slave trade undermined Portugal's near monopoly on the lucrative oceanic spice and slave trades. This sent the Portuguese spice trade into a long decline. To a lesser extent, the diversion of wealth from Portugal by the Habsburg monarchy to help support the Catholic side of the Thirty Years' War also created strains within the union, although Portugal did benefit from Spanish military power in helping to retain Brazil and in disrupting Dutch trade. These events, and those that occurred at the end of the House of Aviz and the period of the Iberian Union, led Portugal to a state of dependency on its colonies, first India and then Brazil.

== The continuity in the administrative system ==
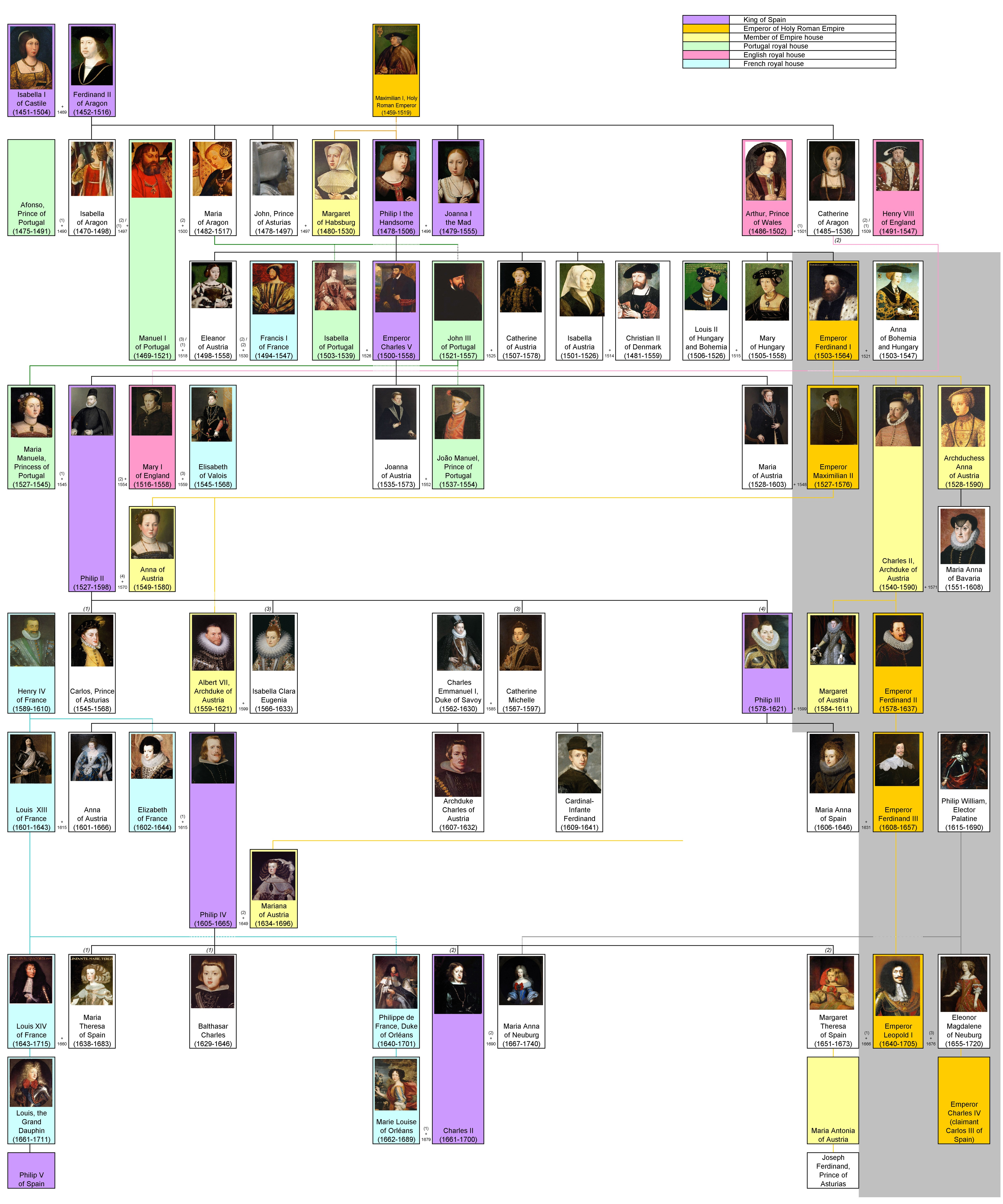
Spanish Habsburgs' family tree and connection with Portugal royal house of Aviz

Due to complexity in the management of government affairs, the Spanish Monarch established auxiliary bodies called Councils (Consejos), dedicated to providing advice toward resolution of problems. The Councils needed a permanent seat, and so King Philip II of Spain established in 1562 the permanent capital in Madrid, seat of the Royal Court and of the administrative staff. During a brief period (1601–1606), the whole administrative staff held court in Valladolid.

Administrative correspondence originated from different Councils and was delivered by each Council Secretary to Madrid for the attention of the Crown. The king would later assemble the secretaries to request the Council's opinion. The meetings of the Councils took place in the royal palace, and they did not count on the presence of the king habitually. In this polisynodial system stood out for its importance, the Consejo de Estado (Council of State).

Relating to the particular government of the kingdom of Portugal itself. During the union of the kingdom of Portugal to the Spanish monarchy, the Spanish Habsburgs on the whole respected the pledges made at Thomar in 1581 to allow considerable Portuguese autonomy and to respected the territories of its empire. Public offices were reserved for Portuguese subjects at home and overseas. The king was represented at Lisbon sometimes by a governor and sometimes by a viceroy. So, Spain left the administration of Portugal and its empire largely to the Portuguese themselves, under general supervision from Madrid channeled through a viceroy in Lisbon. Important matters, however, were referred to Madrid, where they came before the Council of Portugal. In the kingdom of Portugal, the polisynodial system is reinforced:

- Council of State. The Conselho de Estado of Lisbon is the King's private Council, entrusted of debating major issues related to the Crown, especially foreign policy. The counselors would send their remarks to the king, and the King consulted them through his Viceroy. Although the Conselho de Estado of Lisbon worked as the great adviser Council to the King's delegate, this Council of State was without clearly defined administrative powers and actually it did not perform relevant roles of coordination. The Spanish kings maintained the system of two secretaries of state, one for the kingdom and the other for "India", that is to say, for the colonies, despite several conflicts over jurisdiction, until the creation of the Conselho da India in 1604.
- In the same way, Spanish kings retained the Mesa da Consciência e Ordens, which was both tribunal and as a council for religious affairs and was responsible for administering ecclesiastical appointments and for the property of the military orders in the colonies as well as in the home country.
- Portuguese Inquisition remained independent from the Mesa da Consciência e Ordens. There were three major courts in Lisbon, Coimbra and Évora.
- Also preserved was the Desembargo do Paço. The pinnacle of the entire Portuguese judicial system was the Desembargo do Paço or Royal Board of Justice in Lisbon. This board, the highest court in the kingdom, controlled the appointment of all magistrates and judges and oversaw the Casa de Supplicação or Court of Appeals in Lisbon, as well as the high courts in the Portuguese overseas territories. The first function of the Desembargo do Paço was to control the recruitment of the magistrates (leitura de bachareis) and to monitor them in the exercise of their charge. Its control spread to the whole of the juridical professions. The Desembargo do Paço had to arbitrate conflicts between other courts of the kingdom. This court granted dispensations, acts of legitimization and other relevant issues about the justice and the grace, and which on occasions advised the king on political and economic as well as judicial matters. Moreover, a commission of jurists set up to reform the legal system produced a new code for Portugal, the Ordenações filipinas, promulgated in 1603.
- The Casa de Supplicação and the Casa do Civel, both are two royal courts of appeal for civil cases as criminal cases. The Casa do Civel exercised jurisdiction over the northern part of the kingdom, and the Casa de Supplicação over the rest on the realm including the islands and overseas.
- In 1591, the four Vedores da Fazenda (overseers of the Treasury) were replaced by a Conselho da Fazenda composed of one Vedor da Fazenda presiding over four councillors (two of them lawyers) and four secretaries. The Conselho da Fazenda exercised a control over the officials of finance, administered the particular king's goods and exercised its jurisdiction over the customs and the arsenals, the court of accounts and the administration of the monopolistic trade with overseas.
- From 1604, the newly created Conselho da India was invested with powers for all overseas affairs, apart from matters concerning Madeira, the Azores and the strongholds of Morocco, and colonial officials were appointed and their dispatches handled by it.

Nevertheless, the political conjuncture needed urgent reactions, and in this context a system of meetings appeared for specific issues, as the Junta for the reform of the Council of Portugal (1606–1607, 1610), the Junta for the classification of the debts to the treasury (since 1627) or the Juntas for the organization of the navies of succor of Brazil (since 1637)...

== The Portuguese Empire challenged ==
The union of the two crowns deprived Portugal of a separate foreign policy, and Spain's enemies became Portugal's. England had been an ally of Portugal since the Treaty of Windsor in 1386. War between Spain and England led to a deterioration of the relations with Portugal's oldest ally, and the loss of Hormuz. English help provided by Elizabeth I of England in a rebellion against the kings assured the survival of the alliance. War with the Dutch led to invasions of many countries in Asia, including Ceylon (today's Sri Lanka), and commercial interests in Japan, Africa (Mina), and South America. Even though the Portuguese were unable to capture the entire island of Ceylon, they were able to keep the coastal regions of Ceylon under their control for a considerable time. Brazil was partially conquered by both France and the Seventeen Provinces.

In the 17th century, taking advantage of this period of Portuguese weakness, many Portuguese territories in Brazil were occupied by the Dutch who gained access to the sugarcane plantations. John Maurice, Prince of Nassau-Siegen was appointed as the governor of the Dutch possessions in Brazil in 1637 by the Dutch West India Company. He landed at Recife, the port of Pernambuco, in January 1637. By a series of successful expeditions, he gradually extended the Dutch possessions from Sergipe on the south to São Luís de Maranhão in the north. He likewise conquered the Portuguese possessions of Elmina Castle, Saint Thomas, and Luanda, Angola, on the west coast of Africa. After the dissolution of the Iberian Union in 1640, Portugal would reestablish its authority over the lost territories of the Portuguese Empire. The Dutch intrusion into Brazil was long-lasting and troublesome for Portugal. The Seventeen Provinces captured a large portion of the Brazilian coast including Bahia (and its capital Salvador), Pernambuco (and its capital Recife), Paraíba, Rio Grande do Norte, Ceará, and Sergipe, while Dutch privateers sacked Portuguese ships in both the Atlantic and Indian Oceans. The large area of Bahia and its city, the strategically important Salvador, was recovered quickly by a powerful Iberian military expedition in 1625. This laid the foundations for the recovery of remaining Dutch controlled areas. The other smaller, less developed areas were recovered in stages and relieved of Dutch piracy in the next two decades by local resistance and Portuguese expeditions.

On the other hand, the Iberian Union opened to both countries a worldwide span of control, as Portugal dominated the African and Asian coasts that surrounded the Indian Ocean, and Spain the Pacific Ocean and both sides of Central and South America, while both shared the Atlantic Ocean space.

== Decline of the Habsburg Empire and revolt of Portugal ==
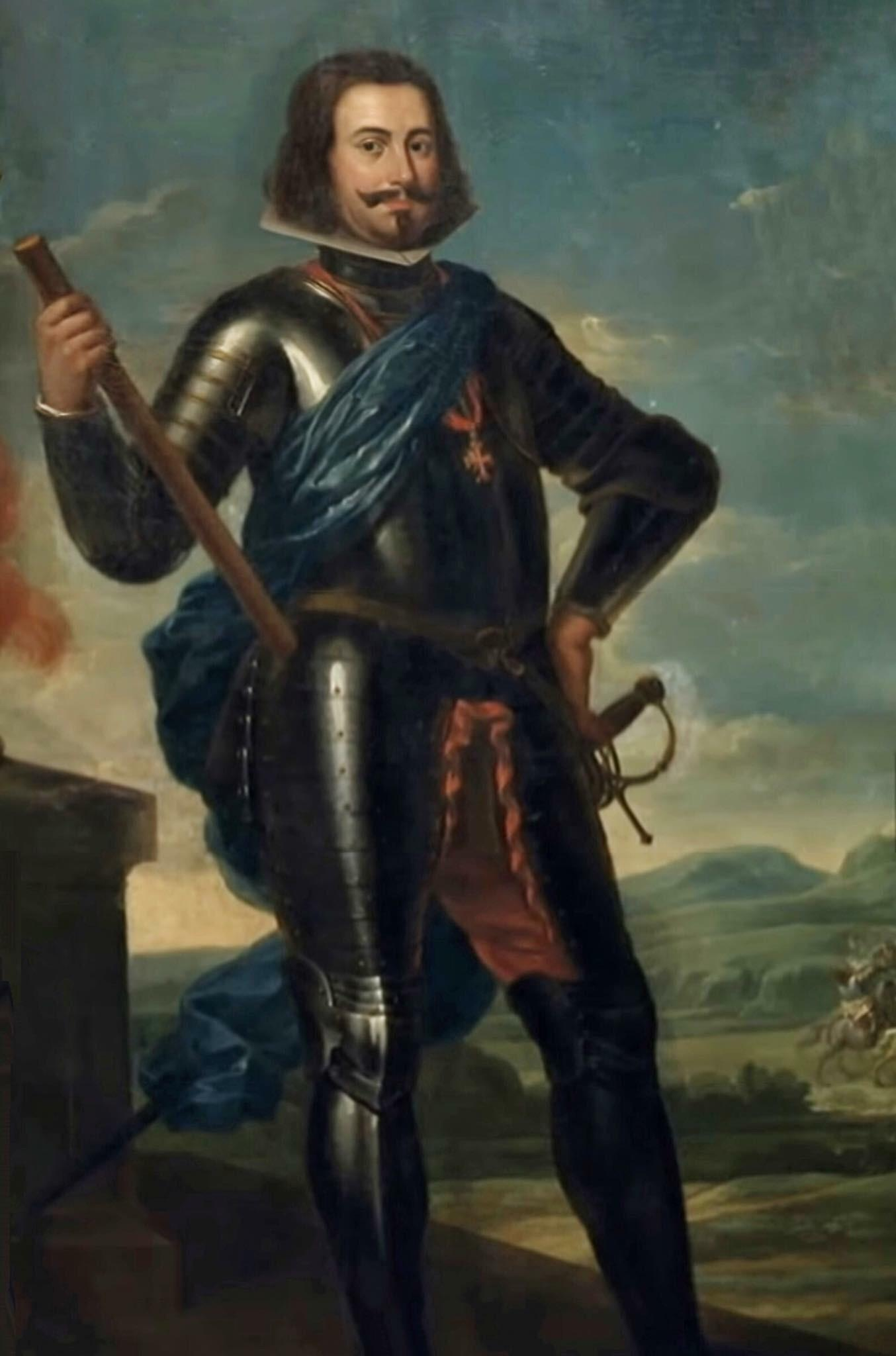
John IV of Portugal (João IV)

When Philip II of Portugal (Philip III of Spain) died, he was succeeded by Philip III (and IV of Spain) who had a different approach on Portuguese issues. Taxes raised affected mainly the Portuguese merchants (Carmo Reis 1987). The Portuguese nobility began to lose its importance at the Spanish Cortes, and government posts in Portugal were occupied by Spaniards. Ultimately, Philip III tried to make Portugal a royal province, and Portuguese nobles lost all of their power.

This situation culminated in a revolution by the nobility and high bourgeoisie on December 1, 1640, 60 years after the crowning of Philip I. The plot was planned by Antão Vaz de Almada, Miguel de Almeida and João Pinto Ribeiro. They, together with several associates, killed Secretary of State Miguel de Vasconcelos and imprisoned the king's cousin, the Duchess of Mantua, who had governed Portugal in his name. The moment was well chosen, as Philip's troops were at the time fighting the Thirty Years' War and also facing a revolution in Catalonia.

The support of the people became apparent almost immediately and soon John, 8th Duke of Braganza, was acclaimed King of Portugal throughout the country as John IV. By December 2, 1640, John had already sent a letter to the Municipal Chamber of Évora as sovereign of the country.

== Restoration War ==
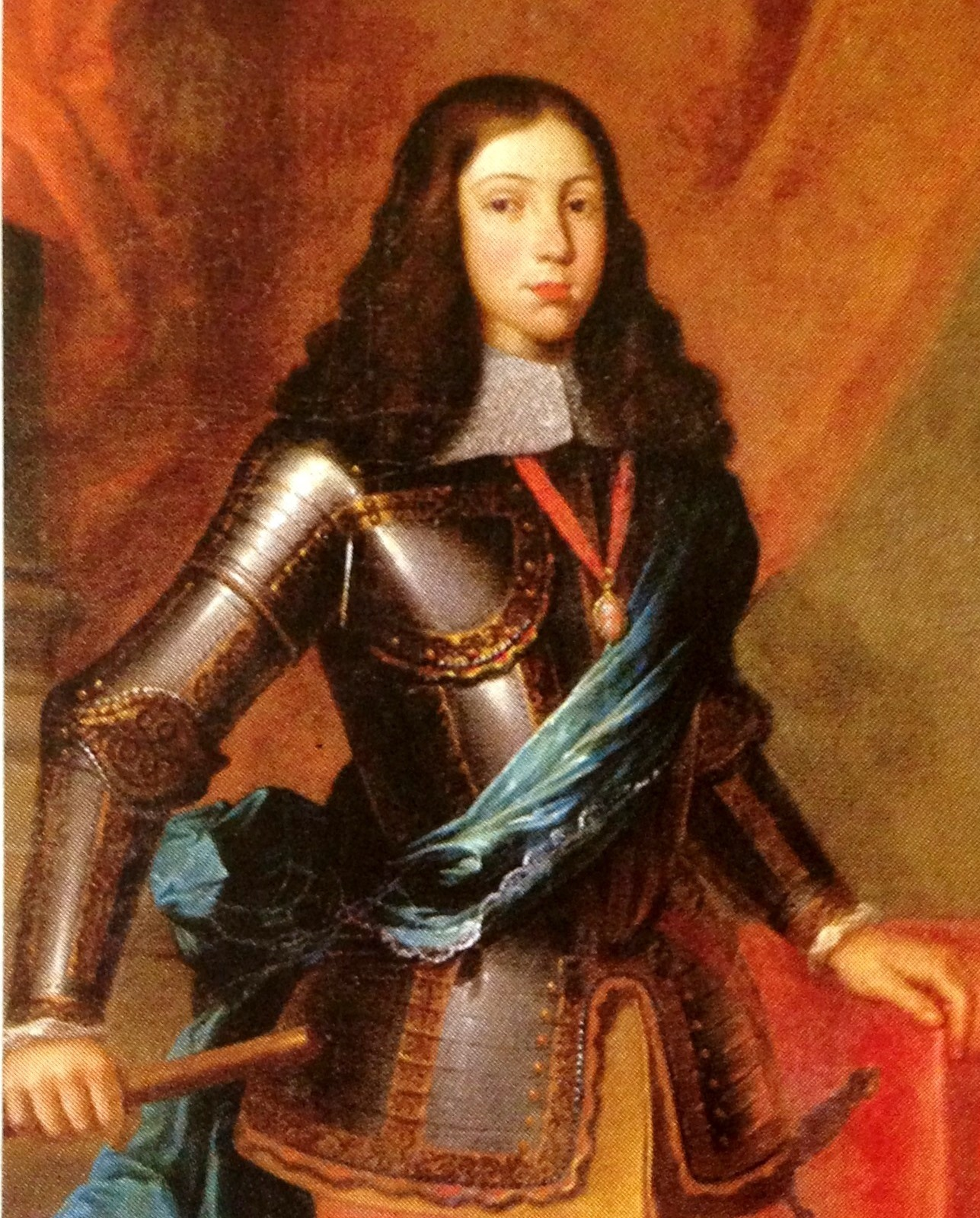
Afonso VI, second King of the House of Braganza.

The subsequent Portuguese Restoration War against Philip III (Portuguese: Guerra da Restauração) consisted mainly of small skirmishes near the border. The most significant battles being the Battle of Montijo on May 26, 1644, the Battle of the Lines of Elvas (1659), the Battle of Ameixial (1663), the Battle of Castelo Rodrigo (1664), and the Battle of Montes Claros (1665); the Portuguese were victorious in all of these battles.

Several decisions made by John IV to strengthen his forces made these victories possible. On December 11, 1640, the Council of War was created to organize all the operations. Next, the king created the Junta of the Frontiers, to take care of the fortresses near the border, the hypothetical defense of Lisbon, and the garrisons and sea ports. In December 1641, a tenancy was created to assure upgrades on all fortresses that would be paid with regional taxes. John IV also organized the army, established the Military Laws of King Sebastian, and developed intense diplomatic activity focused on restoring good relations with England.

After gaining several decisive victories, John quickly tried to make peace. His demand that Philip recognize the new ruling dynasty in Portugal was not fulfilled until the reign of his son Afonso VI, during the regency of Afonso's brother Infante Pedro, by the Treaty of Lisbon (1668).

== Portuguese monarchs from the House of Habsburg ==
Name	Lifespan	Reign start	Reign end	Notes	Family	Image
Philip I: the Prudent	21 May 1527 – 13 September 1598 (aged 71)	25 March 1581	13 September 1598	Grandson of Manuel I	Habsburg	Philip I of Portugal
Philip II: the Pious	14 April 1578 – 31 March 1621 (aged 42)	13 September 1598	31 March 1621	Son of Philip I	Habsburg	Philip II of Portugal
Philip III: The Great; The Tyrant; The Oppressor; Portuguese: Filipe III	8 April 1605 – 17 September 1665 (aged 60)	31 March 1621	1 December 1640 (deposed)	Son of Philip II	Habsburg	Philip III of Portugal

== Coats of arms of Titles held by the House of Habsburg ==
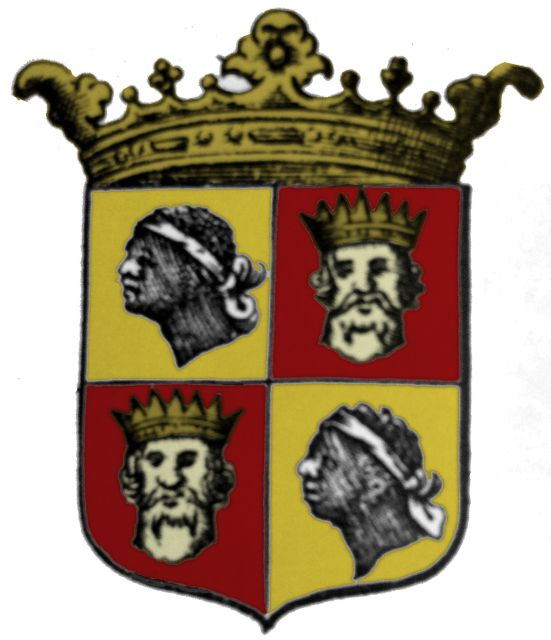
Coat of Arms	Title	Time Held	Coat of Arms	Title	Time Held
	King of Portugal	1581–1640		King of the Algarve	1581–1640

== See also ==
- History of Portugal
- List of Portuguese monarchs
- Timeline of Portuguese history
- Portuguese House of Burgundy
- House of Aviz
- House of Braganza
- Portuguese Succession War
- Struggle for the throne of Portugal
- 1580 Portuguese succession crisis

*Royal House* Philippine dynasty Cadet branch of the House of Aviz
Preceded by House of Aviz	Ruling House of the Kingdom of Portugal; 1580–1640	Succeeded by House of Braganza
