= Supreme Military Council and of Justice =

Supremo Conselho Militar e de Justiça (Supreme Military Council and of Justice) was a governmental organ of the Portuguese Empire created by Dom João VI on 1 April 1808, shortly after the transfer of the Portuguese court to Brazil. It was composed of two quasi-independent organs; the Supreme Military Council, responsible for administrative matters of the Portuguese Army and Navy, and the Council of Justice, that was the last instance of prosecutions where the defendants were under military jurisdiction. The council lasted through the State of Brazil, Kingdom of Brazil and the Empire of Brazil, being dissolved during the United States of Brazil on 24 February 1891, when it was substituted by the Supreme Military Court.

== History ==
The Supreme Council of Military and of Justice was established by Dom João VI through the charter of 1 April 1808 as part of the reforms of the Portuguese Court after their arrival to Brazil. It revoked the royal charter of 29 November of 1806, that had established the local Councils of Justice. The council also broke the authority governors had over military ranks and other matters. It initially operated on the provisory grounds of the Ministry of War, but in 1811 it was transferred to the building no. 123, Praça da República, Rio de Janeiro.

After the Independence of Brazil in 1822, the Constitution of 1824 determined that the Empire's highest judiciary instances ought to be the Supreme Council and the Supreme Court of Justice.

After the Proclamation of the Republic on 15 November 1889, the United States of Brazil did not immediately change several aspects of the administration of the Empire of Brazil, but the Supreme Council was eventually substituted by the Supreme Military Court on 24 February 1891, with the promulgation of the Constitution of 1891. The new Court started operating de facto by the Decree no. 49, of 18 July 1893, where little changed from the old system. All the council members were kept, but their monarchical titles were stripped off and they were renamed as ministers.

== Attributions ==
The council agglomerated military attributions of the Councils of War, Admiralty and Overseas, headquartered in Lisbon. The Supreme Military Council dealt with administrative matters of the Army and Navy, such as applications, letters patent, promotions, wages, reforms, nominations, suspension of military ranks and the use of insignias.

The Council of Justice judged on last instance cases of defendants that were under the military jurisdiction and have passed through the Council of War. The charter of 1810 gave the council permission to judge cases of prisoners made by warships or Portuguese ship-owners, and to be informed and judge on last instance cases of shipwrecking.

== Structure ==
The Supreme Council was made up of two relatively independent organs: The Supreme Military Council and the Council of Justice.

=== Supreme Military Council ===
The Supreme Military Council was regulated by the Council of War statute of 22 December 1643, as well as for the other resolutions and royal orders that ruled the organ, and the Council of Admiralty charter of 26 October 1796. In 1820, the Inspection Council of War Squares and Fortresses was created under the Supreme Military Council hierarchy, but it was extinguished on 5 June 1821.

The charter of 1808 defined that the council should be composed of the Counsellors of the War and Admiralty that came from Portugal, besides other members of the Army and the Navy that should act as Vogais (non-counsellors that have the right to vote), but it didn't define the total amount of members or their proportion related to the organs previously cited. The charter didn't define the presidency either, that was initially fulfilled by the monarch himself. From 18 July 1893 on, the president was elected by his peers.

The number of members greatly changed over time. According to the Almanaque do Rio de Janeiro, in 1811 there were nine Councillors, two Vogais, one Secretary, and three Ministers adjunct to the Council of Justice. In 1816, there were six Councillors and three Vogais. In 1817, there were two Ministers. In 1825, there were eight Councillors.

=== Council of Justice ===
The Council of Justice was the highest Military Court of the Portuguese Empire, and it was regulated by the decrees of 20 August 1777, 5 October 1778, 13 August 1790 and 13 November 1790. All local Councils of War were under its rule, except the ones from the Captaincies of Pará, Maranhão and the overseas Portuguese domains, due to the difficulties to reach those territories.

The charter of 1808 defined that the council should be composed of the Counsellors of the War and Admiralty, besides other three ministers.

== See also ==
- Desembargo do Paço
- Mesa da Consciência e Ordens
- Council of Finance
- Royal Junta of Commerce, Agriculture, Factories and Navigation of this State and Overseas Domains
