= Royal Junta of Commerce, Agriculture, Factories and Navigation of this State and Overseas Domains =

Real Junta do Comércio, Agricultura, Fábricas e Navegação foi organizada tendo como modelo a Junta do Comércio deste Reino e seus Domínios (Royal Junta of Commerce, Agriculture, Factories and Navigation of this Kingdom and its Domains), previously called Junta do Comércio destes Reinos e seus Domínios (Junta of Commerce of these Kingdoms and Its Domains) was an organ of the Portuguese Empire created on 30 September 1755 during the reign of D. José I. It dealt with many matters of commerce, agriculture factories and navigation, including in its administration, fiscalization and as a supreme court.

The organ was recreated in the State of Brazil on 23 August 1808 as the Real Junta do Comércio, Agricultura, Fábricas e Navegação deste Estado e Domínios Ultramarinos (Royal Junta of Commerce, Agriculture, Factories and Navigation of this State and Overseas Domains).

It was dismantled in the Kingdom of Portugal on 18 September 1834, and on the Empire of Brazil on 25 June 1850.

== History ==
The Junta of Commerce of these Kingdoms and Its Domains was created during the reign of D. José I by the Decree of 30 September 1755, having its bylaws properly defined by the Decree of 16 December 1756. It was created as part of the administrative reforms made by Sebastião José de Carvalho e Melo, seeking to better the commerce and revenue of the Portuguese Empire. It substituted the Board of the Holy Spirit of Businessmen that Seek the Common Good of Commerce.

It became a supreme court by the Law of 5 June 1788, changing its name to Royal Junta of Commerce, Agriculture, Factories and Navigation of this Kingdom and its Domains.

In Brazil, the Royal Junta of Commerce, Agriculture, Factories and Navigation of this State and Overseas Domains was created by Fernando José de Portugal e Castro through the Charter of 23 August 1808. It was established shortly after the transfer of the Portuguese court to Brazil as part of the economic reform in the State of Brazil, where D. João VI ended the trade monopoly with the Kingdom of Portugal with the Decree of the Opening of Ports for Friendly Nations and permitted the establishment of factories by revoking the Charter of 1785. The organ substituted the Boards of Inspection.

In Portugal, the organ was extinguished by the Decree of 18 September 1834. In Brazil, it was extinguished by the Law n° 556, 25 June 1850, being substituted by the courts of commerce.

== Structure ==
In the Kingdom of Portugal, its presidency was composed of one provider, one secretary, one prosecutor, six deputies, one conservative judge and one fiscal prosecutor. All deputies were businessmen well reputed in Lisbon or Porto.

In the State of Brazil, the organ was composed of one president, being the same as the Royal Treasury, a variable number of deputies, one of whom was also the secretary, one conservative judge and one inspector. The Charter of 14 August 1809 created the roles of judge of the bankrupt and general-superintendent of smuggling. The roles of conservative judge and judge of the bankrupt were extinguished by the Charter of the Charter of 13 May 1810.

In the Captaincy of Rio de Janeiro, the organ was subdivided into the Court, Secretary, Accounting, the Class of Commerce and the Board of Contribution and Inspection. It had branches in other captaincies, with the Class of Commerce being present in the Captaincy of Bahia and Captaincy of Pernambuco and the Board of Contribution and Inspection being present in the Captaincy of Maranhão. The broker and the insurance provider of the Companhia de Seguros Indemnidade were also under the inspection of the organ.

== Attributions ==
The Junta had broad attributions, including fiscalizing retail in Lisbon, defined the Empire's mercantile policies, took measures for preventing, repressing and fiscalizing smuggling, fiscalized the industry in the Kingdom of Portugal, supervised the Board of Common Good of the Merchants, ruled over commerce judicial procedures, naturalized foreigners, fiscalized the Royal Factory of Silk, administered and inspected lighthouses and other locations related to navigation and the Class of Commerce and served as a consultive organ for matters of agriculture and mining.

In Brazil, the organ was responsible for all matters of commerce, agriculture, factories and navigation. Amongst its attributions were giving prizes, privileges and exemptions for inventors, concession of goods for factories, keeping a record of merchants, administering the goods of the deceased, dealing with bankruptcies, managing commerce consulates, administering matters of navigation, whaling, lighthouses, roads, bridges and canals, managing importations and exportations, distributing insurances and judging over matters of commerce. The organ was also actively responsible for lecturing the Class of Commerce.

== See also ==
- Desembargo do Paço
- Mesa da Consciência e Ordens
- Council of Finance
- Supreme Military Council and of Justice
- Board of Maritime Dispatch
