= Royal Treasury (Portugal) =

Tesouro Público do Rio de Janeiro (Public Treasure of Rio de Janeiro), previously called Erário Régio (Royal Treasury), also known as Real Erário (Royal Treasury), Real Fazenda (Royal Treasure), Tesouro Público (Public Treasure) and Tesouro Geral (General Treasure), was the royal treasury from the Portuguese Empire.

It was created on 22 December 1761 by Sebastião José de Carvalho e Melo to centralize the bookkeeping of the empire and thus better its performance. The organ suffered several changes throughout the years, most notoriously being united with the Council of Finance under the Secretary of State of Businesses of Finance in 1790.

The Royal Treasury was reestablished in the State of Brazil by D. João VI on 11 March 1808 after the transfer of the Portuguese court to Brazil, being the main center of taxation in the colony.

The organ came to an end on 25 March 1824 in the Empire of Brazil, being incorporated into the Ministry of Finance, and 14 September 1833 in Portugal, being substituted by the Public Treasure as a consequence of the Liberal Wars.

== History ==
The headquarters of the Royal Treasury in Lisbon.

The Royal Treasury was established by the Charter of 22 December 1761, during the reign of D. José I. It substituted the House of Accounts and centralized the Kingdom's finances as part of the administrative reforms made by Sebastião José de Carvalho e Melo. The organ was heavily modified in attempts to fulfill the constant changes brought by the Portuguese Empire finances. It was elevated to a State Secretary by the Charter of 14 October 1788, and by the Charter of 17 December 1790 it was united with the Council of Finance under the Secretary of State of Businesses of Finance.

The Royal Treasury was reestablished in the State of Brazil by D. João VI by the Decree of 11 March 1808 and named Fernando José de Portugal e Castro as its president as part of the transfer of the Portuguese court to Brazil. Despite that the organ wasn't fully installed, and through the Decision nº 5, of 13 March 1808, it only dispatched payments for expenses of the Captaincy of Rio de Janeiro and deliver funds for treasurers and private emissaries of the Crown, with its other functions being fulfilled by the Royal Treasury Junta of Rio de Janeiro. It was later reestablished together with the Council of Finance by João Alvares de Miranda Varejão through the Chart of 28 June 1808. Both had the same attributions as their Portuguese counterparts. The organ was renamed to Public Treasure of Rio de Janeiro by the Decree of 9 November 1821.

On 7 September 1822, after the Independence of Brazil, it became one of the main governmental organs of the Empire of Brazil. It kept operating up until 25 March 1824. With the promulgation of the Constitution, its attributions were then transferred to the Ministry of Finance.

In Portugal, the Royal Treasury was extinguished by D. Pedro IV by the Decree n° 22, of 16 May 1832, in Terceira Island, substituting it for the Public Treasure. But his orders were given during the Liberal Wars and D. Miguel was still in power in Lisbon, and the organ was extinguished de facto during the Siege of Porto with the Decree of 14 September 1833.

== Structure ==
=== Portugal ===
Originally, the Royal Treasury had several Treasury juntas under its control that operated in the Portuguese Empire captaincies. In the Kingdom of Portugal, it was composed of one general-treasury and four contadorias (accounting sectors), responsible for the bookkeeping of the Court and the province of Estremadura. There were created other general contadorias:

- General Accounting for the Provinces of the Kingdom and the Islands of the Azores and Madeira
- General Accounting for West Africa, Maranhão and Bahia
- General Accounting for East Africa, Rio de Janeiro and Portuguese Asia

Several new accounting methods were implemented. First, double-entry bookkeeping was applied for revenues and expenses entries. The Regiment of 22 December 1761 installed a total of 107 registry books, including a master book, where all transactions were registered, and a diary, where the treasury transactions were registered in chronological order. There was also the auxiliary book, used to keep track of every individual revenue source, including its contracts, rights and taxes. Debts had their own records that had to be presented to the General-Treasury. Each debt book had its duplicates kept by the treasurers of the Royal House and the Warehouses of Guinea and India.

It was presided over by a general-inspector, also called president. The first one was Sebastião José de Carvalho e Melo, who presided the organ up until 1777. From October 1778 on, the Royal Treasury was elevated to the role of State Secretary, and presided over by the Secretary of State for the Treasury Partition, but in June 1779 it became the role of the Inspector of the Royal Junta of Commerce, Agriculture, Factories and Navigation. There was also a Main Treasurer and a scribe, and after 22 December 1761 there were other three Treasurers, a General-Inspector and a General Accountant.

The Charter of 13 March 1797 created the General-Treasury of Interests and the Junta of Interests from the Royal Loans. The Decree of 17 December 1787 reorganized the Kingdom's Accounting, giving birth to the General Accounting of the City of Lisbon and the Accounting of the Province of Estremadura. After the French occupation in Portugal, the Decree of 30 December 1807 extinguished two Accountant Sectors, but the decision was reverted by the Portaria of 19 September 1809. In 1820, the two last General Accounting were unified as the General Accounting of Rio and Bahia. In 1828, both General Accountings are extinguished due to the Independence of Brazil and the General Accounting of Adjacent Islands and Overseas Domains and the General Accounting of the Provinces of the Kingdom were created.

=== Brazil ===
In Brazil, the Royal Treasury was composed of the Main Treasury, the Council, three General-Treasuries and one General-Treasury of the Ordained, Pensions, Interests and Terças (third-part).

The General-Treasuries were subdivided into the First, Second and Third Treasury, which had the following attributions

- First Treasury: Responsible for receiving income collected in the Captaincy of Rio de Janeiro
- Second Treasury: Responsible for the countability and demanding payment from East Africa, Portuguese Asia and the Captancies of Minas Gerais, São Paulo, Goiás, Mato Grosso and Rio Grande de São Pedro do Sul, and after the Decision n° 25, of 27 July 1808, bookkeeping and liquidation of the customs bills.
- Third Treasury: Responsible for bookkeeping, accountabilty and inspection of the Captaincies of Bahia, Pernambuco, Maranhão, Pará, Ceará, Piauí, Paraíba, the islands of Cape Verde, Azores and Madeira, and West Africa, and after the Decision n° 25, of 27 July 1808, liquidation of Casa da Moeda do Brasil's bills.

The General-Treasury of the Ordained, Pensions, Interests and Terças was responsible for making payments for members of the Royal Treasury. The Decree of 5 September 1808 also established the Director's Office for Diamonds Administration and Extraction, that oversaw the diamond extraction in Brazil. The General-Accounting of the Colonies was created by the Decree of 22 December 1819, for matters related to trust funds.

The Council was composed of the president, the main treasurer and one registrar. The Main Treasury was composed of one general-treasurer, two second-bookkeepers, two third-bookkeepers, two amanuensis, two practitioners, three bona fides, one of which was responsible for payments, one gatekeeper, six office workers and one scribe. From 1811 on, there was a fourth bona fide.

== Attributions ==
The Royal Treasury was created to centralize in one organ the treasury with the bookkeeping, thus accelerating the bookkeeping process as a whole and making the cash inflow as quick as the withdrawal. It was responsible for the fundraising, distribution and administration of goods of the Portuguese Empire. It accumulated gold, silver and other products sent to the Kingdom of Portugal from their colonies. It was then used to finance its expeditions. It also liquidated debts of the Warehouses of Guinea and India, after the Charter of 6 April 1773, and collected interest from loans given by the Crown, after the Charter of 13 March 1797. It also took care of the bookkeeping of religious institutions and important families, including the House of Braganza, the House of the Queens and Igreja Patriarcal.

When established in Brazil, it became the main center of taxation over sugar and mining. It aggregated the attributions of the Boards of Inspection by the Decree of 13 June 1809 and the attributions not transferred to the Royal Junta of Commerce, Agriculture, Factories and Navigation. On 17 August 1809, it aggregated yet more attributions of the Boards of Inspection, such as taxation of tobacco, aguardiente, Angolan slaves, salt, green meat, stamps and whale hunting. It was also responsible for bookkeeping salt sales and supervising the arrival of slaves. By the Decision nº 19, of 21 April 1821, the payment of pensions paid by the Royal Small Finances was transferred to the Royal Treasury.
