= Sir Graham Moore Islands =

Sir Graham Moore Islands may refer to:

- Sir Graham Moore Islands (Nunavut), in the Canadian Arctic 67°50′N 113°55′W
- Sir Graham Moore Islands (Western Australia), off the Kimberley coast 13°52′54″S 126°36′11″E
  - Sir Graham Moore Island (Western Australia), off the Kimberley coast 13.8896°N 126.5494°E

== See also ==
- Graham Moore (disambiguation)
