= Mesa da Consciência e Ordens =

Portuguese governmental body

Mesa da Consciência e Ordens (Board of Consciousness and Orders), previously called Casa da Consciência (House of Consciousness), was a Portuguese governmental organ created in 1532 to help with ethical matters of the king of Portugal. It had several attributions, including as an ecclesiastical court, a consultive and administrative organ. It was extinguished in 1833, during the reign of D. Maria II.

== History ==
Casa da Consciência was founded by D. João III in Évora in December 1532 to help deliberate about ethical matters of the expansion of the Portuguese Empire. In 1544, its first president is appointed. On 4 January 1551, it was renamed to Mesa da Consciência e Ordens through a papal bull of Pope Julius III due to the introduction of military ranks in Portugal. Its main regulations were written on 14 November 1558, 20 June 1567, both by D. Sebastião and Julius III, and 23 August 1608 by Filipe III. Other important regulation was of 10 November 1562, that permitted the court to judge crimes of knights in second instance.

On 22 April 1808, after the transfer of the Portuguese court to Brazil, D. João VI established the court in Rio de Janeiro.

The Brazilian court was extinguished on 18 September 1828, with its attributions passed to the Supreme Court of Justice. Its documents were collected on 4 October 1846 and cataloged in 1855.

In Portugal, the process of extinction of the court began on 24 January 1821, requested by Boaventura José de Brito, that was shortly joined by the request of José Alves Branco on 18 April. At the time, it was considered corrupt and even anti-constitutional. On 31 August 1822, congressman Trigoso de Aragão created the project for its extinction, but the process was halted by the dissolution of the Chamber of Deputies on 13 March 1828, during the reign of D. Miguel. The dissolution was fulfilled by decree on 16 August 1833. Minister and Secretary of State for Business and Finance José da Silva Carvalho signed it on behalf of Queen D. Maria II to "...simplify the public administration, and stripping it off useless and exorbitant authorities, as well to diminish the National Treasure of unecessary expenses."

== Attributions ==
Mesa da Consciência e Ordens was created as a court for civil and religious lawyers, including clergymen with special jurisdiction, and as a consultative organ to deliberate about matters of the consciousness of the king of Portugal. It was created based on Renaissance values as part of the reforms made by D. João III to further centralize power in his hands. Despite that, there were several instances that the court halted the actions of the king, such as the armed invasion of India during the reign of D. João III. The court was under the influence of the Catholic Church and helped expand the religion in the Portuguese Empire. It was also important to bring intellectuals to Portugal.

On consultive matters, the organization helped the king make good choices over ordinations and answer missives sent from colonized islands, India and Brazil.

It also acted as an ecclesiastical court, overseeing goods of several orders, collecting goods from deceased subjects outside of the Kingdom of Portugal, and collecting tributes from the orders of Our Lady of Angels, Saint Christopher and Our Lady of Aid, judging clergymen and dispatching pardon letters sent to the king. Despite its ties with the Church, it remained apprehensive over its creation, as the new institution permitted pigliare, the act of nominating and restricting clergymen without the permission of the Holy See.

In administrative matters, it took care of schools, including Colleges of Saint Patrick, of Catecúmenos, of the Poor Clergymen, of the Orphan Boys, the Military College of Coimbra, and the University of Coimbra (up until 1772); hospitals, including Hospital of Our Lady of Light, Royal Hospital of Caldas (up until 1775), Royal Hospital of Coimbra, Hospital of Saint Lazarus of Coimbra and Hospital of Santarém; chapels, including the Chapel of the royal padroado and the ones from D. Afonso IV, D. Manuel, D. Dinis, and D. Beatriz; and the Mercearias of the West Indies, the goods of D. Leonor stored in Óbidos, Queen D. Catarina and D. Luís. It also checked testaments sent to the king, fiscalized clergymen sent to evangelize outside of Portugal or received benefits from the government, found intellectuals desired by the king, administrated orders and licenses from surrenders of captives, verified deadlines of commanderies and other goods, and inspectiorated the adoption of orphans in the castle.

== Structure ==
The court was made out of at least four deputies, but it could have more roles depending on how many demands it had to solve. To be part of the court, one must be a Portuguese man of a minimum age of 25 years-old and had to be accepted by the king. It was subdivided as the following:

- Secretaria da Mesa e Comum das Ordens (Secretary of the Chamber and Common of the Orders)
- Secretaria do Mestrado da Ordem de Cristo (Secretary of the Masters of the Order of Christ)
- Secretaria do Mestrado da Ordem de Santiago da Espada (Secretary of Masters of the Order of Saint James of the Sword)
- Secretaria do Mestrado da Ordem de São Bento de Avis (Secretary of Masters of the Order of Saint Benedict of Aviz)
- Contos da Mesa e Contadorias dos Mestrados (Finances of the Chamber and Finances of the Masters)
- Secretaria das Arrematações e Tombos das Comendas (Secretary of Revenue and Archives of the Commanderies)
- Chancelaria das Ordens Militares (Chancellery of the Military Orders)
- Juízo Geral das Ordens (General Court of the Orders)
- Juízo dos Cavaleiros (Court of the Knights)
- Executória das Dívidas das Comendas (Enforcement of the Comendas Debts)

== See also ==
- Supreme Military Council and of Justice
- Desembargo do Paço
- Council of Finance
- Royal Junta of Commerce, Agriculture, Factories and Navigation of this State and Overseas Domains
