= Desembargo do Paço =

Court of Appeal of Paço
- Tribunal do Desembargo do Paço
- Established: 1477
- Dissolved: August 3, 1833
- Jurisdiction: Portuguese Empire
- Location: Lisbon, Rio de Janeiro
- Authorised by: King of Portugal
- Appeals from: Câmara do Cível and Câmara da Suplicação
- Language: Portuguese

Tribunal do Desembargo do Paço (Court of Appeal of the Palace), Mesa do Desembargo do Paço (Chamber of Appeal of the Palace) or Desembargo do Paço (Appeal of the Palace) was one of the highest courts of the Kingdom of Portugal, being active from the 15th century to the 19th century. Besides its judicial attributions, it also had some roles today attributed to the Executive branch of the Ministry of Justice.

== History ==
Desembargo do Paço was created in 1477 during the reign of D. João II, being subordinated to Casa da Suplicação. It became independent in 1521, when the 2nd. edition of the Manueline Ordinances renamed it as Tribunal dos Desembargadores do Paço and gave it more attributions. It was further regulated in 1533, with the creation of its subdivisions. From there on, it was renamed as Tribunal do Desembardo do Paço. It became the biggest appellate court of the Portuguese Empire, with its highest authority being the king himself. The ordinances were kept up until the rule of D. Sebastião.

On 27 July 1582, Filipe II created new regulations and on 9 March 1605 authorized it by letter to emit processions in urgent cases even though they were still not signed by the king. In 1604 Filipe II also renewed some of the court attributions through the Filipine Ordenances.

On 22 April 1808, after the transfer of the Portuguese court to Brazil, D. João VI created Mesa do Desembargo do Paço in Rio de Janeiro, extinguishing the previously established Mesa do Rio de Janeiro. On 10 September 1811, due to the great distances amongst the Brazilian territory, the Portuguese court established Juntas de Desembargo in every captaincy, maintaining only the old Mesas established in the Captaincy of Bahia and Captaincy of Maranhão. Up until the independence of Brazil in 1822, only two other juntas were created: In Vila Bela, Captaincy of Mato Grosso (13 September 1813), and in the Captaincy of Goiás (25 May 1818). They further decentralized the old system and were responsible for most of the legal resolutions in the United Kingdom of Portugal, Brazil and the Algarves. During this period, court was criticized for being excessively bureaucratic and corrupt.

The Brazilian Desembargo do Paço was extinguished by law on 22 September 1828, being substituted by the Supreme Court of Justice. Its documents were collected by the Empire of Brazil on 6 August 1845 and classified in one year. The Portuguese Desembargo do Paço was extinguished by decree on 3 August 1833, with its attributions being passed to the secretariats of state and several other courts.

== Attributions ==
From 1521 on, Desembargo do Paço was responsible for:

- issuing legal actions in the name of the king;
- reviewing legal actions judged by Câmara do Cível and Câmara da Suplicação;
- emitting bail permits and letters of privilege, habitation and legitimacy;
- receiving and emitting petitions and pardons;
- commuting and confirming convictions and sentences;
- deliberating about petitions;
- confirming the election of magistrates, profiling actions and donations;
- gathering documents related to commerce.

From 1582 on, the court was given permission to emit processions in urgent cases even though they were still not signed by the king, solving conflicts between Casa do Cível and Casa da Suplicação and proceeding with legal actions about property changeover. The Filipine Ordenances took away the court attributions of emitting letters of privilege and others and emitting orders to financial organs and other courts.

From 1811 on, the court was decentralized with the establishment of local courts in all the captaincies of the Portuguese Empire. They were responsible for finding a resolution for most judicial issues and other matters of the kingdom.

== Structure ==
Up until mid-17th century, the court was ruled by the king. It was composed by a Justice Ruler, a main chancellor, doctors-in-law, desembargadores, prosecutors and three ombudsmen. The peripheral courts were ruled by the Governors. It was subdivided into three main instances:

- Mesa dos Desembargadores (Chamber of the Judges): Responsible for emitting processes when consulted;
- Repartição das Justiças e do Despacho da Mesa (Division of Justices and Chamber Emissions): Responsible for emitting and administering processes and proceeding with issues related to the progress of royal servants;
- Repartição das Comarcas (Division of the Districts): Responsible for issues related to peripheral Portuguese territories. It was subdivided into the Secretariats of the Court; Estremadura and Islands; Beira, Alentejo and Algarve; and Minho and Trás-os-Montes. In the end of the 18th century, the Secretariat of the Revision of Books was created. It was responsible for economic matters.

After the transfer of the court to Brazil in 1808, it was ruled by a president, from four to six judges, and from three to five deputies. The Juntas de Desembargo were presided over by the governor, captain-general, an ombudsman, a desembargador and others, if the governor deemed necessary.

== See also ==
- Supreme Military Council and of Justice
- Mesa da Consciência e Ordens
- Council of Finance
- Royal Junta of Commerce, Agriculture, Factories and Navigation of this State and Overseas Domains
