= Board of Maritime Dispatch =

Mesa do Despacho Marítimo (Board of Maritime Dispatch) was an organ created in Rio de Janeiro on 3 February 1810 by the Portuguese Crown to control the increasing maritime commerce in the State of Brazil after the end of the trade monopoly with the Kingdom of Portugal.

It was substituted on 10 September 1830 by the Board of Several Incomes.

== History ==
The Board of Maritime Dispatch was created in Rio de Janeiro by D. João VI by the Decree of 3 February 1810. The organ was created to control the ever-increasing maritime commerce in the State of Brazil due to the Decree of the Opening of Ports for Friendly Nations, that ended the colony's trade monopoly with the Kingdom of Portugal. It substituted the recently created Vessels Dispatcher. The organ was not initially successful, which led to the introduction of dispatch stowage by the Decree of 12 April 1810.

It was extinguished by the Decree of 10 September 1830, being partly substituted by the Board of Several Incomes and other local dispatch stations.

== Attributions ==
The Board of Maritime Dispatch was created to centralize and control the dispatch of vessels and flux of goods at the Port of Rio de Janeiro. As the dispatch process was complex and of the responsibility of several people, the organ removed and corrected losses caused by delays by collecting emoluments, taxes and contributions.

== Structure ==
The organ was initially composed of an inspector, a treasurer, a registrar and an office boy. A second registrar was stipulated by the Decree of 10 October 1810 and a gatekeeper was stipulated by the Decree of 14 August 1819.

The Decree of 30 January 1811 established the organ in the captaincies of Bahia, Maranhão and Pernambuco.

== See also ==
- Royal Junta of Commerce, Agriculture, Factories and Navigation of this State and Overseas Domains
