= Captaincy of Cumã =

Former territorial division of Brazil (1627–1754)

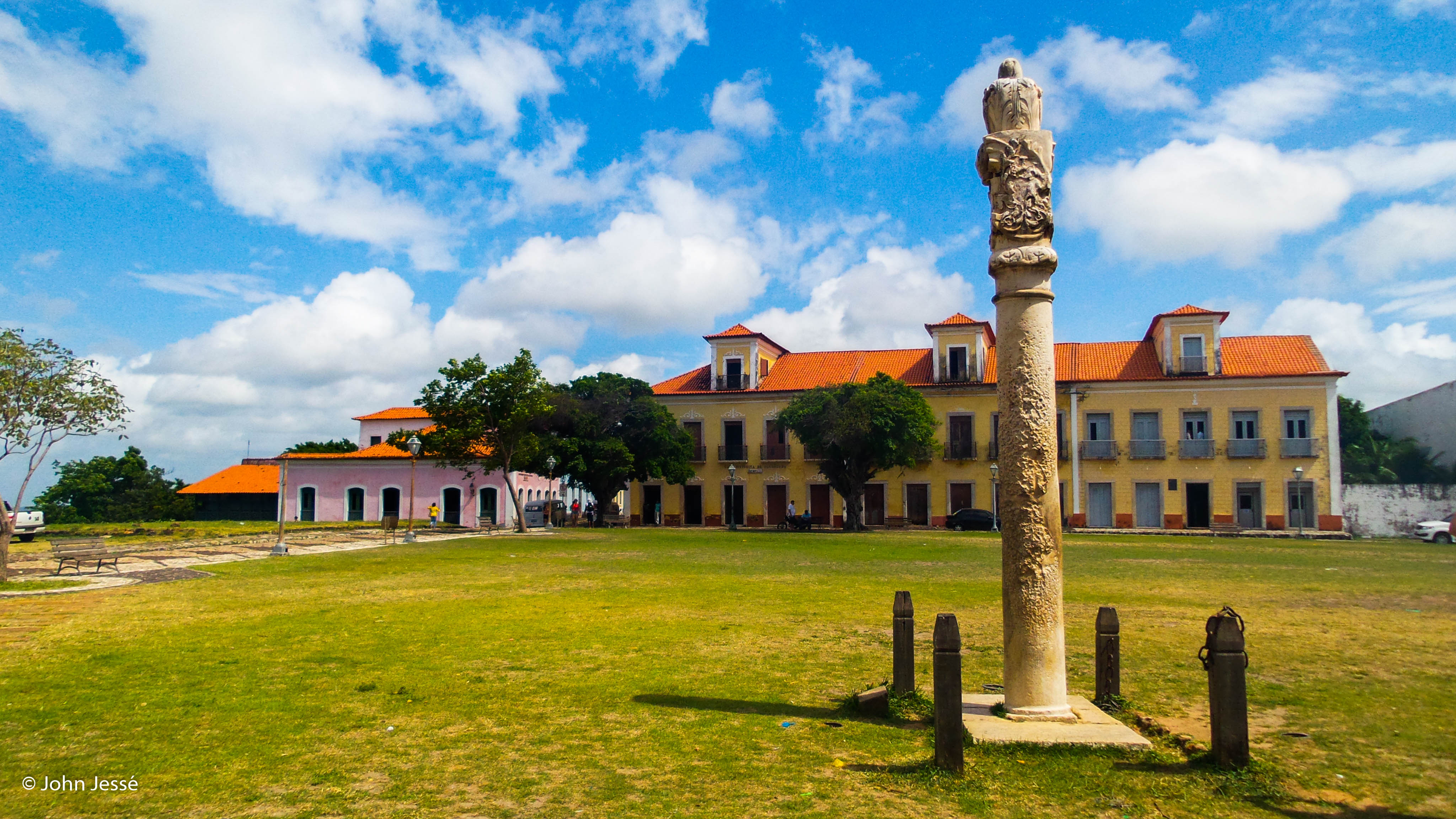
Alcântara's pillory

The Captaincy of Cumã (Portuguese: Capitania de Cumã) was one of the administrative subdivisions of the Brazilian territory during the colonial period in Portuguese America. Created in 1627 and donated to Antônio Coelho de Carvalho, it was also called the Captaincy of Tapuitapera or Alcântara.

== History ==
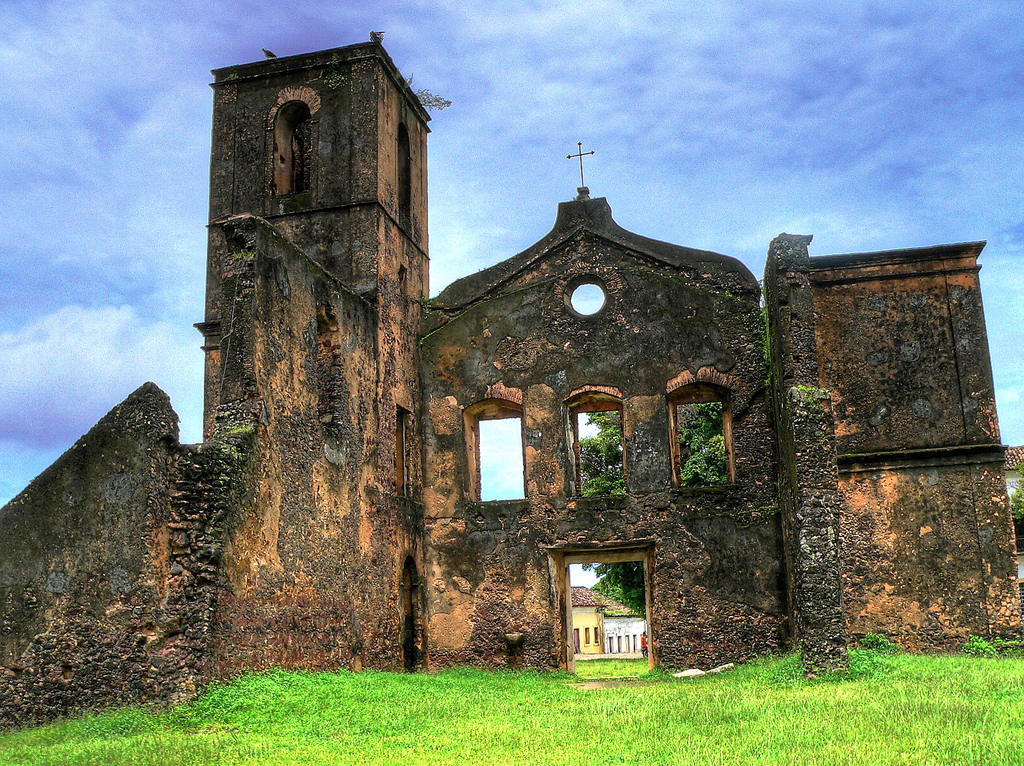
Ruins of the Mother Church of Saint Matthias, a symbol of Alcântara. The church was allegedly built in 1622 and struck by lightning in 1875, which caused the collapse of the roof and condemned its structure, although there is no historical consensus.

Until 1612, the region of the Captaincy of Cumã was inhabited by a group of villages called Tapuitapera. The French who arrived there, led by Daniel de La Touche, established friendships with these communities and built the first chapel a short time later. Between 1616 and 1618, the Portuguese began the process of occupying the region after the expulsion of the French. With the division of territories in the area, Tapuitapera became the seat of the Captaincy of Cumã.

During the Dutch invasion of 1641, the Portuguese lost possession of the land. In 1646, after reclaiming the area, Tapuitapera was elevated to the town of Santo Antônio de Alcântara and began to be active with sugar mills and cotton production. The site also had a town hall, a pillory and a parish church. In the second half of the 18th century, Portuguese policy consisted of the repossession of the hereditary captaincies to the Crown. A Royal Letter from 1753 found in the Resgate Project mentions that the Captaincy of Cumã was bought and reincorporated into the Kingdom of Portugal. However, subsequent documents mention the area as a captaincy, without specifying if it was a royal or private territory, which creates doubts about when the incorporation took place and whether this resulted in the extinction of the captaincy or not. Geographically, the Captaincy of Cumã occupied the region between the mouths of the Mearim, Pindaré and Turiaçu rivers.

Later, Alcântara became the largest production center in Maranhão, rivaling São Luís when the local economy was based on cotton and slave labor. In 1836, Alcântara was elevated to city status and reached its economic peak.

== Historical Center of Alcântara ==
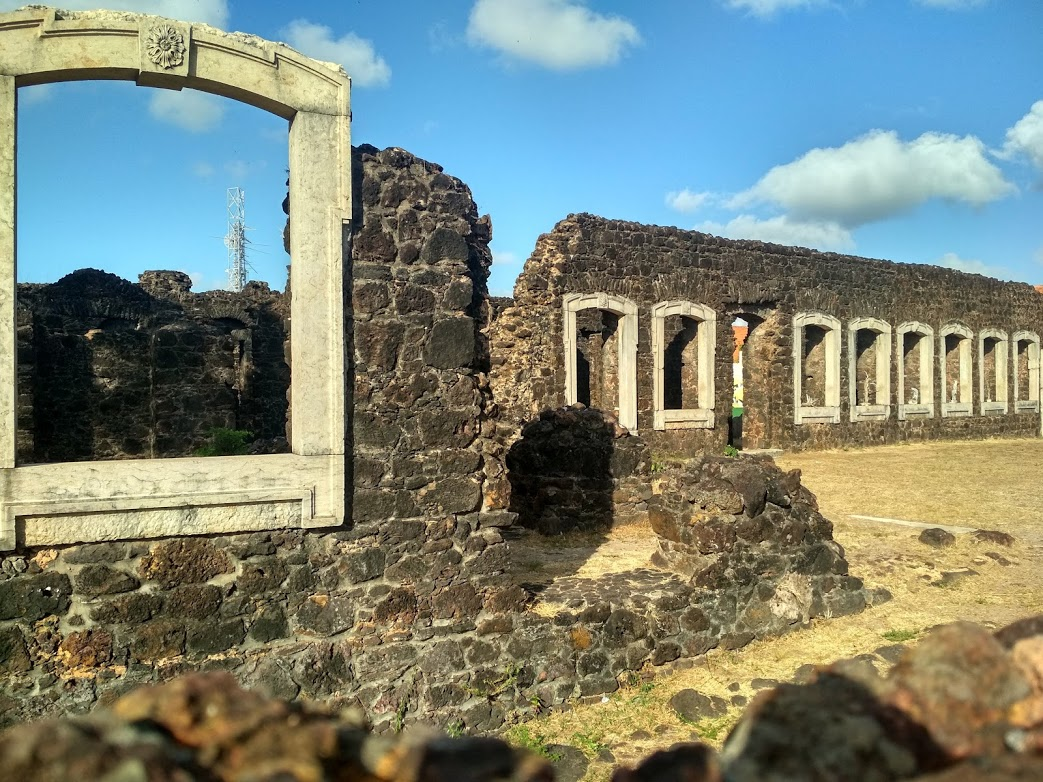
Ruins of the Royal Palace of Alcântara

In 1948, IPHAN listed the architectural and urban complex of Alcântara, composed of approximately 400 buildings, because of its important Portuguese-Brazilian colonial architecture, consolidated throughout the 17th century. The collection includes buildings such as the Church of Our Lady of the Rosary of Black Men, the Church and ruins of the Convent of Mount Carmel, the ruins of the Mother Church of Saint Matthias, the Ladeira do Jacaré, the Chapel of Our Lady of Desterro (now the Church of Saint Joseph), the Stone Fountain, the Alcântara Historical House Museum, the Alcântara Historical Museum, the ruins of the São Sebastião Fort, the Town Hall and Jail, the House of the Divine and the Cavalo de Troia Manor House.

== See also ==
- Captaincy of Maranhão
