= HMS Chatham (1812) =

Ship of the line of the Royal Navy

- Chatham

History

United Kingdom
- Name: HMS Chatham
- Ordered: 1810
- Builder: Woolwich Dockyard
- Laid down: June 1810
- Launched: 14 February 1812
- Completed: By 25 April 1812
- Fate: Sold on 10 September 1817

General characteristics
- Class & type: 74-gun third-rate ship of the line
- Tons burthen: 1,860 25/94 bm
- Length: 177 ft 9 in (54.2 m) (overall); 146 ft 8 in (44.7 m) (keel)
- Beam: 48 ft 10 in (14.9 m)
- Depth of hold: 21 ft 6.5 in (6.6 m)
- Propulsion: Sails
- Sail plan: Full-rigged ship
- Complement: 590
- Armament: Lower deck: 28 × 32-pdrs; Upper deck: 28 × 24-pdrs; Quarter deck: 4 × 12-pdrs + 10 × 32-pdr carronades; Forecastle: 2 × 12-pdrs + 2 × 32-pdr carronades; Roundhouse: 6 × 18-pdr carronades

HMS Chatham was a 74-gun third-rate ship of the line of the Royal Navy. She had been planned as Royal-Hollandais for the French Navy, but was captured while under construction during the Walcheren Campaign.

Royal-Hollandais had been planned as one of the smaller variants of the Téméraire-class ships of the line, and was under construction at Flushing when the town fell in 1809 to a British expeditionary force. The frames were discovered on the slipway, and were packaged up and shipped back to London, where the Admiralty authorised her completion for the Royal Navy. She was duly launched in 1812, and spent a relatively short career in British waters, particularly the North Sea, including some time as a flagship. Poor quality timber used in her construction curtailed her career, and she was reduced to a hulk towards the end of the Napoleonic Wars, was laid up, and finally sold in 1817, five years after having been launched.

== Construction and capture ==
The ship was first laid down for the French Navy at Flushing in the Kingdom of Holland. She was to be a member of the Pluton type, a smaller variant of the Téméraire-class ships of the line, and would have been named Royal-Hollandais on completion. She was still under construction on the stocks when the town fell to the British on 17 August 1809 during the Walcheren Campaign. The frames were taken down, shipped to London and were re-laid at Woolwich Dockyard in June 1810. Also found under construction on the ways were a frigate and a brig, which were destroyed, and the newly built 38-gun Pallas-class frigate Fidèle, which had been launched in June but had not yet been completed. Fidèle was sailed to England and completed there as HMS Laurel. Chatham was launched from Woolwich on 14 February 1812 and had been completed by 25 April 1812.

As completed Chatham was 1,860 25/94 tons burthen, 177 ft 9 in (54.2 m) long on the gun deck, and 146 ft 8 in (44.7 m) at the keel. She was 48 ft 10 in (14.9 m) on the beam, and 21 ft 6.5 in (6.6 m) deep in the hold. She was crewed by 590 men, and carried twenty-eight 32-pounder guns on her lower gundeck, twenty-eight 24-pounders on her upper and four 12-pounders and ten 32-pounder carronades on her quarterdeck. On her forecastle she mounted two 12-pounders and two 32-pounder carronades, with a further six 18-pounder carronades on her roundhouse.

== Career ==
The poor quality timber used in her construction meant that her service life was short. She was commissioned in March 1812 under the command of Captain Graham Moore, and his being promoted to rear-admiral, was succeeded by Captain Robert Maunsell in September that year. Chatham was serving at this time as the flagship of Rear-Admiral Matthew Scott, in the North Sea. She was reduced to a sheer hulk by July 1814, when she came under David Lloyd's command. She was finally laid up at Chatham Dockyard in November 1815, after the end of the Napoleonic Wars, and was sold for breaking up to Joshua Crystall on 10 September 1817 for the sum of £5,110.
