= Colonial pact =

Economic pact between colonizing nations and their colonies

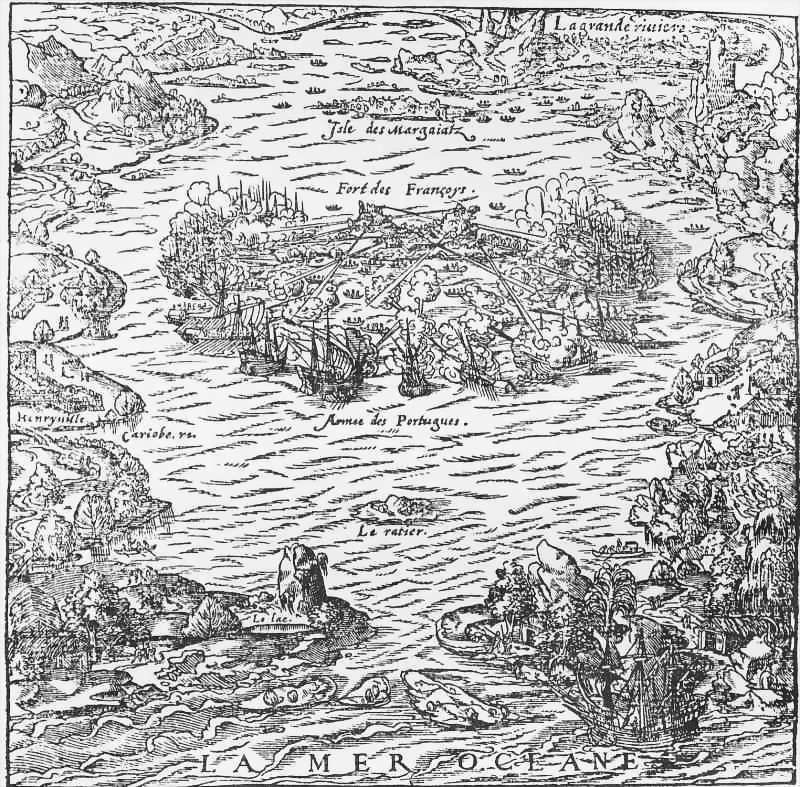
Illustration showing the Portuguese attack on Fort Coligny in 1560: French trade with Indians along the Brazilian coast in the 16th century was seen by the Portuguese as a breach of the colonial pact.

The Colonial Pact, or Metropolitan Commercial Exclusive, was a system of laws and regulations that the colonizing nations imposed on their colonies, meaning: The colonizers were the countries that benefited from the products and economic activity of their colonial territories.

The laws introduced in the pact were mainly aimed at ensuring that the economic activities of the colonies would generate profits for the colonizers and that the colonies would have to buy from and sell products only to the colonizing nations.

This pact system not only controlled the economy between colonizer and colony but also regulated the political activity, military and legal arrangements between them. Examples of known pacts are the one between Portugal and Brazil (colony), and countries in Europe that had colonies in America.

The colonial pact limited the economic activities of the colonial elite. On the one hand, the colonized could only sell their products to merchants approved by the colonizing nation, which did not guarantee them good prices. On the other hand, the prohibition of manufacturing in the colonies prevented the colonial elite from investing in a different sector than the agrarian.

== Brazil ==
In Brazil, an example of a colonial pact occurred with the exploitation of brazilwood. Sebastian, then king of Portugal, declared brazilwood exploitation a monopoly of the Portuguese, meaning that no one could extract brazilwood without permission from the Portuguese crown and the payment of taxes. This monopoly lasted until the Portuguese royal family came to Brazil in 1808. Soon after they docked, John VI, prince regent, opened the Brazilian ports to friendly nations.
