= Graham Moore Bay =

Bay in Nunavut, Canada

- Location within Nunavut
- Location: Viscount Melville Sound
- Coordinates: 75°26′N 101°25′W
- Ocean/sea sources: Arctic Ocean
- Basin countries: Canada
- Settlements: Uninhabited

Graham Moore Bay is an Arctic waterway in Qikiqtaaluk Region, Nunavut, Canada. Located off northern Bathurst Island, the bay is an arm of Viscount Melville Sound.

It was named by Sir William Edward Parry in honour of Vice-Admiral Sir Graham Moore.
