= Chamber of Deputies of Portugal =

Portugal has had two legislative bodies styled the Chamber of Deputies:

- Chamber of Deputies of Portugal (1822–1910), modeled after the UK House of Commons
- Chamber of Deputies of Portugal (1910–1926), modeled after the US House of Representatives
