= Council of Finance =

Conselho da Fazenda (Council of Finance) was a governmental organ of the Portuguese Empire. Established on 20 November 1591, its attributions varied significantly over time, changing from an administrative organ to a court of finances. It was extinguished on 16 May 1832.

== History ==
The Council of Finance was established by the Statute of 20 November 1591, during the reign of Filipe I. It sought to simplify and centralize the administration of the Portuguese Empire, unifying the Courts of the Kingdom, India, and Africa and Auditors and substituting the Chamber of Vedores of Finance and the House of Auditors of Goa.

The Charter of 17 December 1790, the Council of Finance and the Royal Treasury were united under the Secretary of State of Businesses of Finance.

Shortly after the transfer of the Portuguese court to Brazil, João Alvares de Miranda Varejão established both Council of Fiance and Royal Treasury in the State of Brazil through the Chart of 28 June 1808. Both had the same attributions as their Portuguese counterparts.

In Brazil, the Council was extinguished by the Law of 4 October 1831, with its attributions being distributed in local courts and the National Public Treasure.

The Council was extinguished in Portugal by the Decree no. 22, of 16 May 1832, being deactivated de facto by the Decree of 31 July 1833, that established the Court of the Royal Treasury.

Part of its documents were transferred to the Torre do Tombo National Archive on 25 September 1833. Other part was retained by the Partition of the National Particulars and transferred to the archive in January 1854. A third part was stored at the Partition of National Particulars Archive on 14 May 1894. A fourth part was retained by the General-Direction of the National Particulars, being incorporated into the Historical Archive of the Ministry of Finances by Decree-Law no. 28,187, of 17 November 1937, being later incorporated into the Torre do Tombo by Decree-Law no. 106-G, of 1 June 1992. The series "Justifications of the Kingdom" was part of the Relations of Lisboa until it was transferred to Torre do Tombo by the Decree no. 1,659, of 15 June 1915.

== Structure ==
The Council was composed of one Vedor, four counselors and four scribes. Since 1788, after the unification of the Council of Finance with the Royal Treasury, both organs were presided over the Minister of State for Businesses of the Finance.

It was initially subdivided into four partitions:

- Kingdom and Settlement
- India, Mina, Guinea, Brazil, Islands of São Tomé and Cape Verde
- Islands of Azores and Madeira and of the Masters of Military Rank
- Africa, Auditors and Terças (Third Part)

After the creation of the Overseas Council on 14 July 1642, the second partition became the Partition of India and Warehouses. The Charter of 27 August 1770 extinguished the fourth partition, with its attributions passing to the Partition of Islands and Masters of Military Rank. The Decree of 23 January 1804 fused the Partitions of India and Warehouses and of Islands and Masters of MIlitary Rank into the Partition of India and Orders. The Resolution of 30 October 1824 created the Partition of the General Inventory of the Kingdom, and the Decree of 11 December 1830 created the Partition of Chapels of the Crown.

== Attributions ==
In general terms, the Council of Finance inherited the broad attributions of the Vedores da Fazenda, defined by the Statutes and Ordenances of Finances, of 17 October 1516. It rented, leased, transferred, and described all royal goods and revenue, both from the Kingdom and overseas domains, made payments, gave assistance to businesses in India, gave provisions to armed forces, ordered improvements and repairs of lezírias, palaces and fortresses, fiscalized the public bookkeeping, made decisions over goods and rights detained or contested by the Crown and despatched all State expenses regarding their staff, except the graces and mercies of royal goods.

With the promulgation of the Filipine Ordenances, legal matters over finances were transferred to the Court of Feats of Finances, subordinated to the House of Supplication. The Council then became an administrative organ.

Its attributions were limited by a series of administrative reforms made during the 17th century. In 1601, a local Partition of Auditors in Madrid was created, followed by a series of others that descentralized the Portuguese financial system. The Statute of Auditors, of 3 September 1627, gave more juridical autonomy to the House of Accounts of the Kingdom. The Statue of 14 July 1642 created the Overseas Council, taking away almost all the jurisdiction of the Council of Finance from overseas territory, except for the Azores, Madeira and the Portuguese territories in North Africa. The Charter of 18 January 1643 created the Junta of the Three States, that oversaw important Court revenues, including rights over taxes, of the royal waters, of the sugar crates, and of the Chancellery-mor of the Court and the Kingdom.

Followed by the administrative reforms made by Sebastião José de Carvalho e Melo, through the Law of 22 December 1761, the Royal Treasury was created, diminishing the attributions of the Junta of the Three States. The Council then became once again a court, ruling over the revenue, goods and rights of the Crown. Later, both the Council and the Treasury were united under the Secretary of State of Businesses of Finance. With the Decrees of 15 December 1788 and 8 October 1812, the Council became almost exclusively a superior court of finances.

== See also ==
- Mesa da Consciência e Ordens
- Supreme Military Council and of Justice
- Desembargo do Paço
- Royal Treasury (Portugal)
- Royal Junta of Commerce, Agriculture, Factories and Navigation of this State and Overseas Domains
