= Sir Graham Moore Island (Western Australia) =

Island in Western Australia

Coordinates: 13°53′23″S 126°32′58″E

Location of Sir Graham Moore Island

Sir Graham Moore Island is located off the Kimberley coast of Western Australia.

The island encompasses an area of 2,746 hectares (6,786 acres). It is situated within the Sir Graham Moore Islands group, about 45 kilometres (28 mi) north of Kalumburu.

The Juarinanda people were recorded as early inhabitants of the island, but they were decimated by disease in the 19th century, with the remainder of the population moving to Drysdale River Mission. Wunambal, Gaambera and Kwini people made journeys to islands in the area by dugout canoes originally bought from Makassan traders, who began visiting the Kimblerley coast sometime between 1669 and 1763. Both Aboriginal and Makassan peoples harvested and processed sea cucumber. The Juarinanda incorporated several Malay words into their language.

Today, by succession, the traditional owners of the island are the Balanggarra (a.k.a. Kwini) people, of the Worrorran language group, whose name for the island is Niiwalarra. They have visited the island for millennia. Traditional owners have been assisting with archaeological assessments of the island in 2021, for the first time since Ian Crawford did his research in the 1960s. Evidence of pottery and other artefacts from new excavations on the island are being complemented by the oral histories of the Kwini people. A number of hearths are a record of where the trepang was cooked on the beach in large iron pots, with activity especially picking up around 1800.

The group and island were named in 1819 by Phillip Parker King, after Sir Graham Moore, who was then First Naval Lord.

A LORAN radar site was established on the north west corner of the island during World War II by American and Australian forces. The site consisted of a radar building, radio building, a powerhouse and a campsite. The concrete pad for the main building are all that remain today.

There were unsuccessful attempts at cotton farming on the island.

The island once supported a population of feral pigs, but by 2009 they had died out, apparently from the only fresh water source becoming saline following erosion from a cyclone.
