= Sir Graham Moore Islands (Western Australia) =

Island group in Western Australia

Coordinates: 13°52′54″S 126°36′11″E

The Sir Graham Moore Islands are located off the Kimberley coast of Western Australia, at the mouth of Napier Broome Bay.

The group was named in 1819 by Phillip Parker King after Sir Graham Moore (1764–1843), who was then First Naval Lord.

The main island in the group is Sir Graham Moore Island. The group also includes Scorpion Island, Kim Island, and three islets named the Geranium Islands.
