= Graham Moore (Royal Navy officer) =

Royal Navy Admiral (1764–1843)

Admiral Sir Graham Moore GCB GCMG
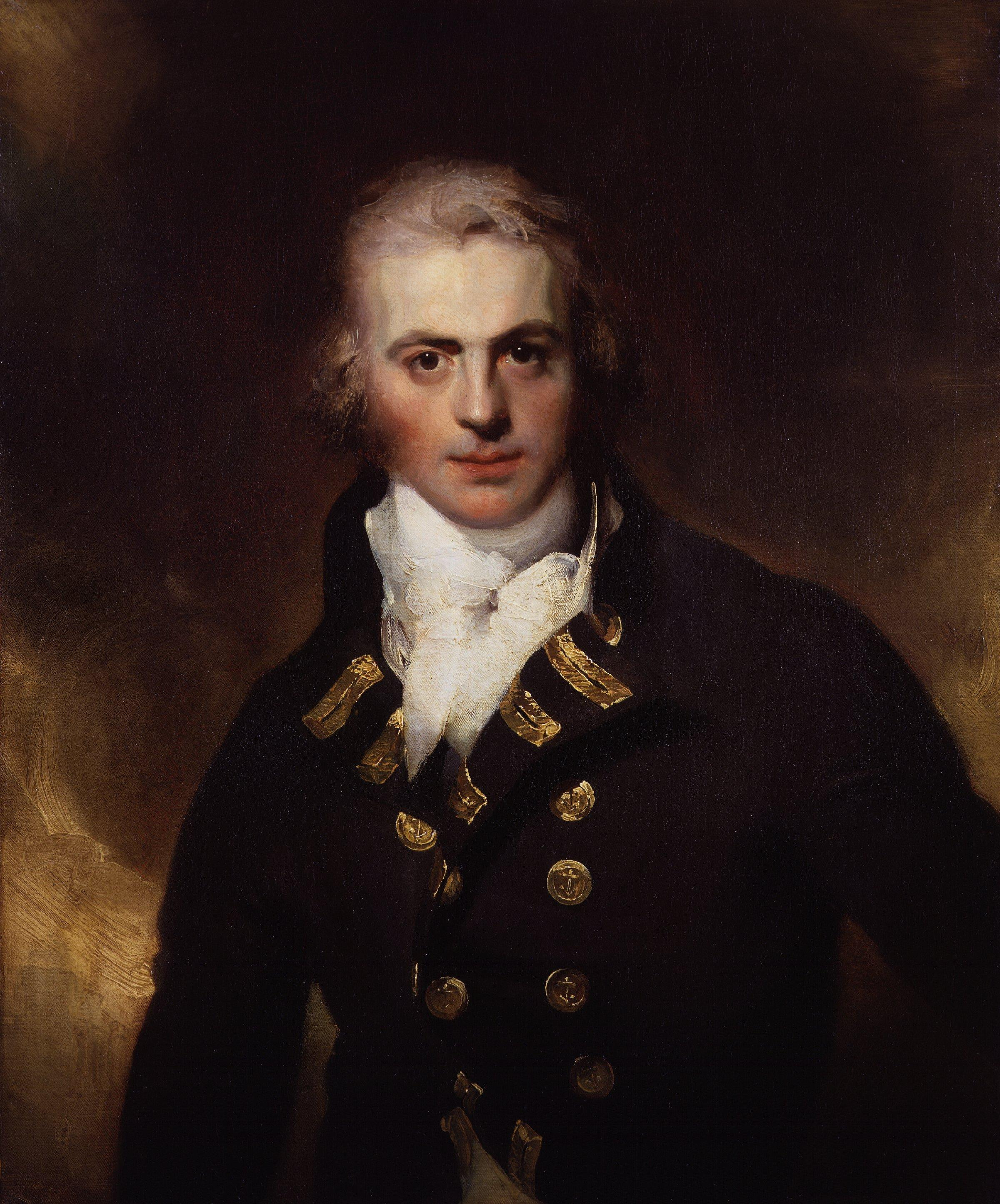
- Portrait of Graham Moore by Sir Thomas Lawrence, 1792
- Born: 1764; Glasgow, Scotland
- Died: 25 November 1843 (aged 78–79); Cobham, Surrey
- Relatives: Dr. John Moore (father); General Sir John Moore (brother); Harriet Jane Moore (niece)
- Military career
- Allegiance: Great Britain; United Kingdom
- Branch: Royal Navy
- Service years: 1777–1839
- Rank: Admiral
- Commands: HMS Bonetta; HMS Syren; HMS Melampus; HMS Indefatigable; HMS Marlborough; HMS Chatham; HMS Fame; Mediterranean Fleet; Commander-in-Chief, Plymouth
- Conflicts: American Revolutionary War; Relief of Gibraltar; Battle of Cape Spartel; Battle of Tory Island; French Revolutionary Wars; Napoleonic Wars; Action of 5 October 1804; Walcheren Campaign
- Awards: Order of the Tower and Sword (1808); Knight Commander of the Order of the Bath (1815); Knight Grand Cross of the Order of St Michael and St George (1832); Knight Grand Cross of the Order of the Bath (1836)

Admiral Sir Graham Moore, GCB, GCMG (1764 – 25 November 1843) was a Royal Navy officer. As a junior officer he took part in the Great Siege of Gibraltar during the American Revolutionary War. As captain of the frigate Melampus, he took part in the Battle of Tory Island in October 1798, capturing the Résolue two days later, during the French Revolutionary Wars. He went on to be First Naval Lord, then Commander-in-Chief, Mediterranean Fleet, and finally, Commander-in-Chief, Plymouth. He was the younger brother of General Sir John Moore.

== Naval career ==
Moore was born in Glasgow, Scotland, the son of Jean Simson and John Moore, doctor and author. He entered the Navy in 1777 at the age of 13. He was promoted to lieutenant on 8 March 1782 to serve aboard Crown, taking part in the relief of Gibraltar under Lord Howe, and the subsequent battle of Cape Spartel in October. During the peace he travelled through France, but was recalled to serve aboard Perseus, Dido, and then Adamant, the flagship of Sir Richard Hughes on the North American Station. On 22 November 1790 he was promoted to commander in the sloop Bonetta, before finally returning to England in 1793.

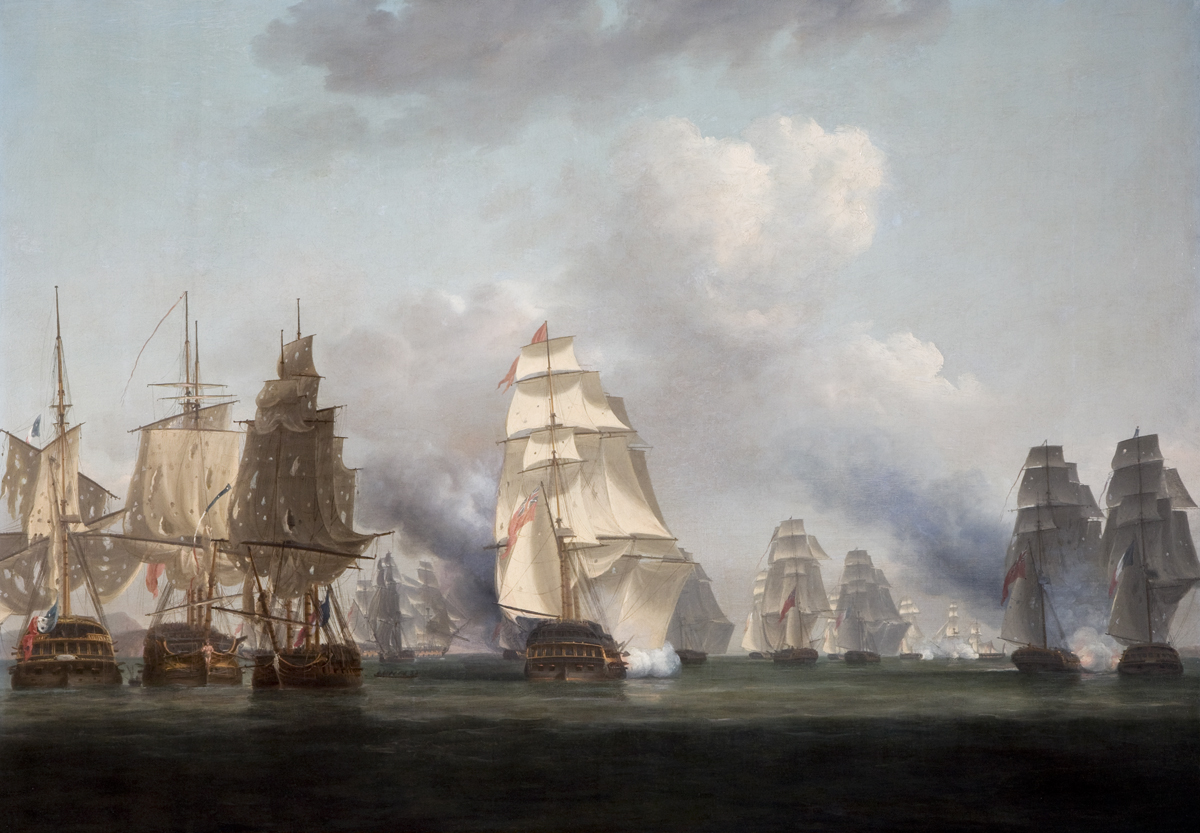
Battle of Tory island on 12 October 1798 by Nicholas Pocock; Moore took part in the action

Moore was promoted to post-captain on 2 April 1794, soon after the start of the Revolutionary War, with command of the 32-gun frigate Syren, in the North Sea and the coast of France. He then commanded the 36-gun frigate Melampus from September 1795. In her he took part in the Battle of Tory Island on 12 October 1798, capturing the Résolue two days later. In February 1800 he went out to the West Indies, but was invalided home after eighteen months.

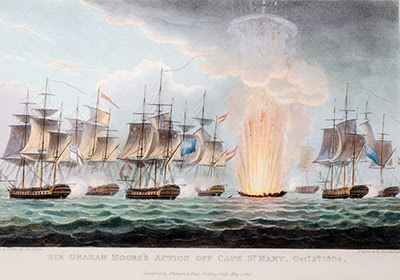
Sir Graham Moore's action off Cape St. Mary, 5 October 1804

On the renewal of the war in 1803 he was appointed to Indefatigable (44), and with three other frigates – Medusa (32), Lively (38) and Amphion (32) – under his command, captured a Spanish treasure fleet of four frigates – Medea (40), Clara (34), Fama (34) and Mercedes (36) – carrying bullion from the Caribbean back to Spain off Cádiz in the action of 5 October 1804.

Moore was then attached to Sir Robert Calder's squadron blockading Ferrol. In 1808, he served as commodore, flying his broad pennant in the new ship Marlborough assisting Admiral Sir Sidney Smith with the Portuguese royal family's escape to Brazil, and was subsequently made a Knight of the Order of the Tower and Sword.

He later served as part of the North Sea fleet for several years. At the close of the Walcheren campaign in December 1809, he was entrusted with destroying the basin, arsenal, and sea defences of Flushing (Vlissingen).

Moore commanded Chatham from March 1812, until promoted to rear-admiral on 12 August 1812, and served as Commander-in-Chief in the Baltic for a short time, flying his flag in HMS Fame. In 1814 he served as captain of the fleet to Lord Keith in the Channel, and, having been appointed a Knight Commander of the Order of the Bath on 2 January 1815, he became second-in-command, Mediterranean Fleet in 1815. He joined the Board of Admiralty as First Naval Lord in the Liverpool ministry in May 1816.

Promoted to vice-admiral on 12 August 1819, he left the Board of the Admiralty in March 1820. He was Commander-in-Chief, Mediterranean Fleet between 1820 and 1823 and was advanced to Knight Grand Cross of the Order of the Bath on 11 March 1836. Promoted to full admiral on 10 January 1837, he served as Commander-in-Chief, Plymouth from 1839 to 1842 flying his flag in Impregnable.

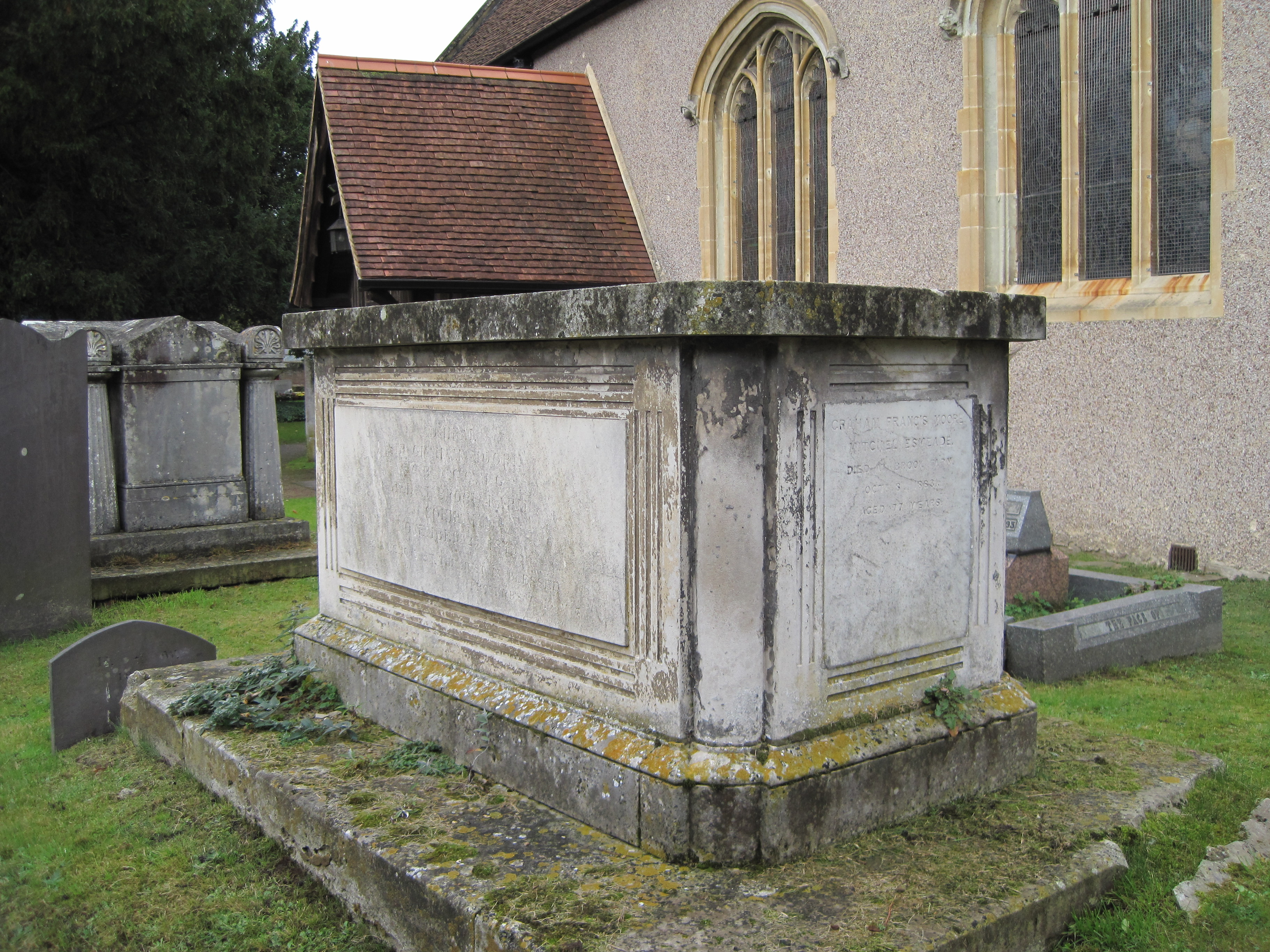
Tomb of Sir Graham Moore at St. Andrew's Church, Cobham, Surrey

Moore died at his home, Brook Farm, Cobham, Surrey, on 25 November 1843, and was buried at St. Andrew's Church.

== Family ==
In 1812 he married Dora Eden, daughter of Thomas Eden, and niece of William Eden, 1st Baron Auckland; they had one son, Captain John Moore, RN (d. 1866).

== Diary ==
Moore kept a detailed diary from 1784 until 1843, comprising thirty-four volumes, which provide a unique account of his service as a lieutenant, commander and captain. The diary is held at Cambridge University Library.

== Namesakes ==
Several places were named in his honour: the Sir Graham Moore Islands, Cape Graham Moore, and Graham Moore Bay, in northern Canada were named by William Parry, while the Sir Graham Moore Islands, Western Australia, were named by Phillip Parker King.

== Sources ==
- Fulton, Henry L. (2015). Dr. John Moore, 1729-1802 : a life in medicine, travel, and revolution. Newark: University of Delaware Press. ISBN 978-1-61149-493-8.
- Rodger, N.A.M. (1979). The Admiralty. Offices of State. Lavenham: T. Dalton Ltd. ISBN 0900963948.

Military offices
Preceded by Sir Joseph Yorke	First Naval Lord; 1816–1820	Succeeded by Sir William Johnstone Hope
Preceded by Sir Thomas Fremantle	Commander-in-Chief, Mediterranean Fleet; 1820–1823	Succeeded by Sir Harry Burrard-Neale
Preceded by Lord Amelius Beauclerk	Commander-in-Chief, Plymouth; 1839–1842	Succeeded by Sir David Milne
