= Transfer of the Portuguese court to Brazil =

1807 escape of the Portuguese royal family and court from invading French forces

- Part of the invasion of Portugal
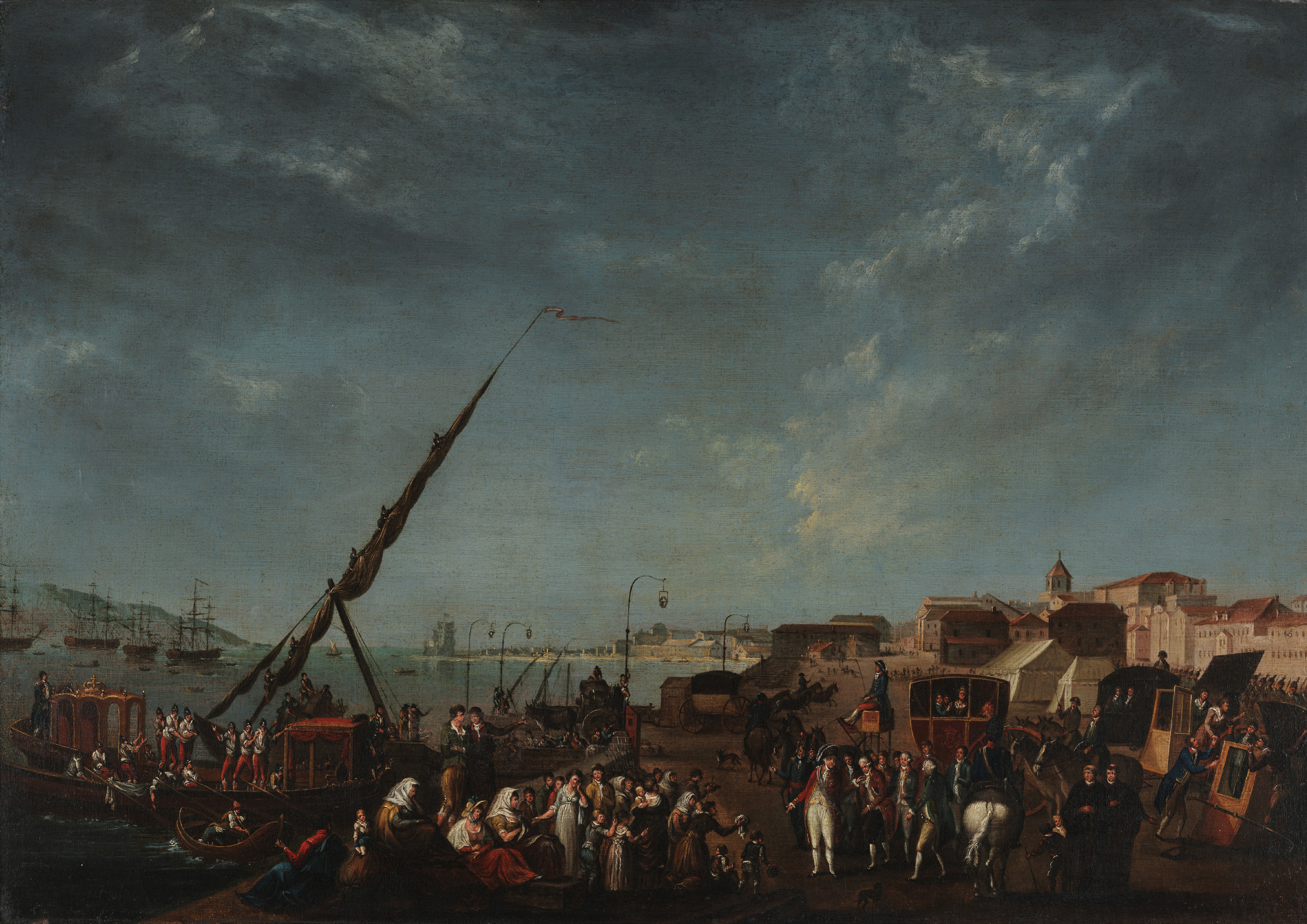
- 19th-century painting of the transfer
- Date: 29 November 1807; 218 years ago
- Participants: Maria I of Portugal; John of Braganza; Graham Moore; Pedro of Braganza
- Outcome: The Portuguese royal family and court move to Brazil

The Portuguese royal court transferred from Lisbon to the Portuguese colony of Brazil in a strategic retreat of Queen Maria I, Prince Regent John (the future King John VI), the Braganza royal family, its court, and senior officials, totaling nearly 10,000 people, on 27 November 1807. The embarkment took place on 27 November, but due to weather conditions, the ships were only able to depart on 29 November. The Braganza royal family departed for Brazil just days before Napoleonic forces invaded Portugal on 1 December 1807. The Portuguese crown remained in Brazil from 1808 until the Liberal Revolution of 1820 led to the return of John VI of Portugal on 26 April 1821.

For thirteen years, Rio de Janeiro functioned as the capital of the United Kingdom of Portugal, Brazil and the Algarves in what some historians call a metropolitan reversal (i.e., a colony exercising governance over the entirety of an empire). The period in which the court was located in Rio brought significant changes to the city and its residents, and can be interpreted through several perspectives. It had profound impacts on Brazilian society, economics, infrastructure, and politics. The transfer of the prince regent and the royal court "represented the first step toward Brazilian independence, since the prince regent immediately opened the ports of Brazil to foreign shipping and turned the colonial capital into the seat of government."

== Background ==
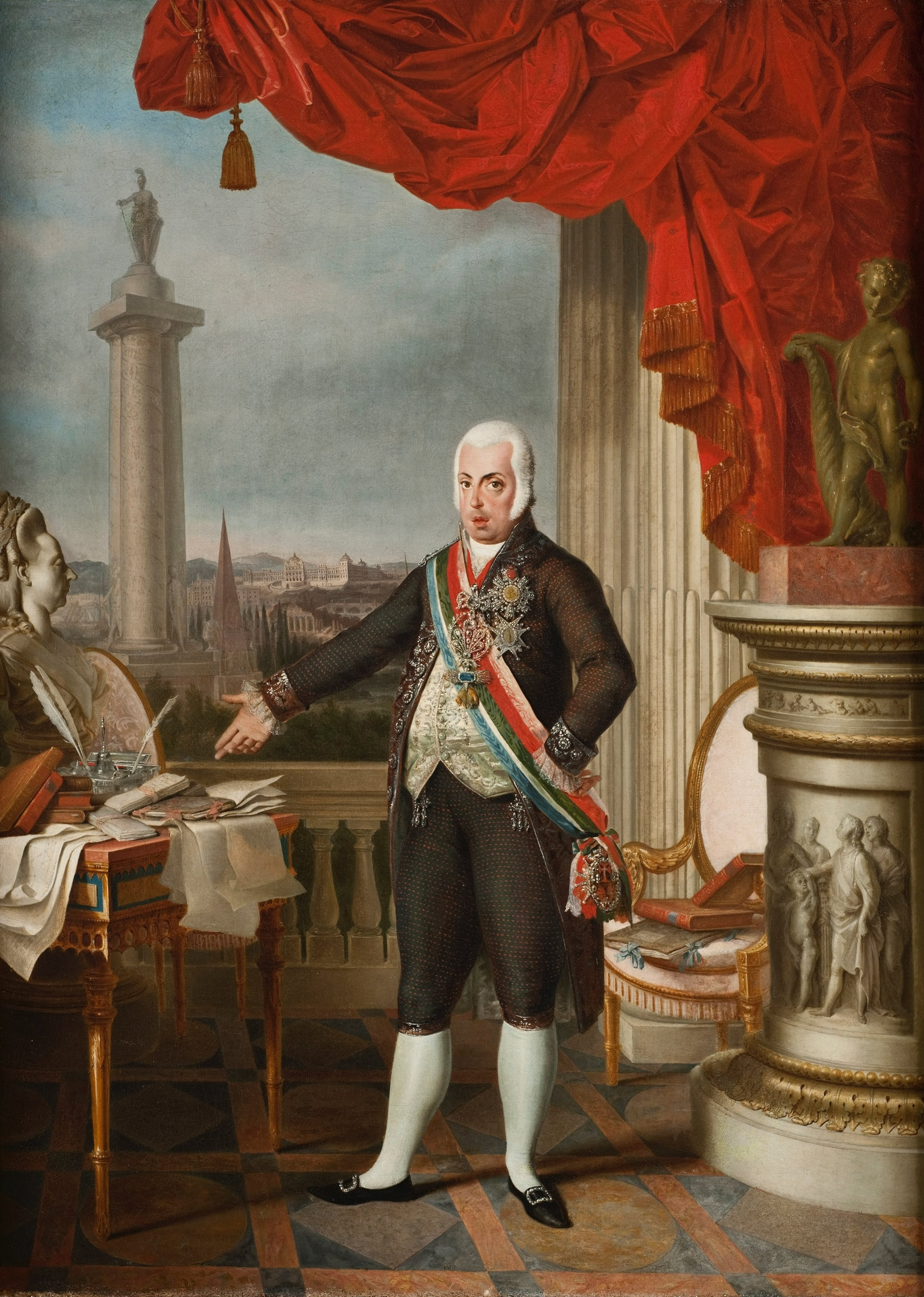
1802 portrait of John, Prince Regent by Domingos Sequeira. The portrait depicts a bust of his mother Maria I, who was judged incapable of handling state affairs due to mental instability in 1799.

On 19 November 1807, French and Spanish forces invaded Portugal, which was one of Britain's last allies in Continental Europe. At the time, John, Prince Regent had been the de facto ruler of Portugal on behalf of his mentally unstable mother Maria I since 1799. Anticipating the invasion, John ordered the Portuguese court to be transferred to Brazil before he could be deposed. On 27 November, the court embarked on a joint Anglo-Portuguese fleet, whose Portuguese Navy contingent consisted of eight ships of the line, five frigates and four smaller warships led by the 90-gun Príncipe Real, and set sail for Brazil on 29 November. On 5 December, part of the fleet's Royal Navy contingent, under Rear-Admiral Sir Sidney Smith, returned to Europe halfway between Lisbon and Madeira; Britain's ambassador to Portugal Lord Strangford was among those who returned. Commodore Graham Moore continued escorting the Portuguese court to Brazil with the British ships of the line Marlborough, London, Bedford, and Monarch.

In 1807, Brazil was a sparsely populated colony, with a little over three million inhabitants. Over a million of Brazil's inhabitants were slaves as a result of the Atlantic slave trade to Brazil. The colony's indigenous population numbered approximately 800,000 people, having been dramatically reduced and marginalised during three centuries of Portuguese colonisation. Brazil's population density was concentrated along the coastline, and during the start of the 19th century Rio de Janeiro experienced a population boom. Over the 18th century, the colony's population had increased tenfold due to the discovery of gold and diamonds, which played a major role in attracting 800,000 Portuguese colonists. During the same century, approximately two million African slaves were imported to Brazil, mostly working in mines or the colony's valuable sugar industry. Most Brazilians were illiterate, poor and lacked access to public utilities and adequate healthcare, with only 2.5% of free men in the colony being literate.

== The transfer ==
=== Arrival in Brazil and first transformations ===
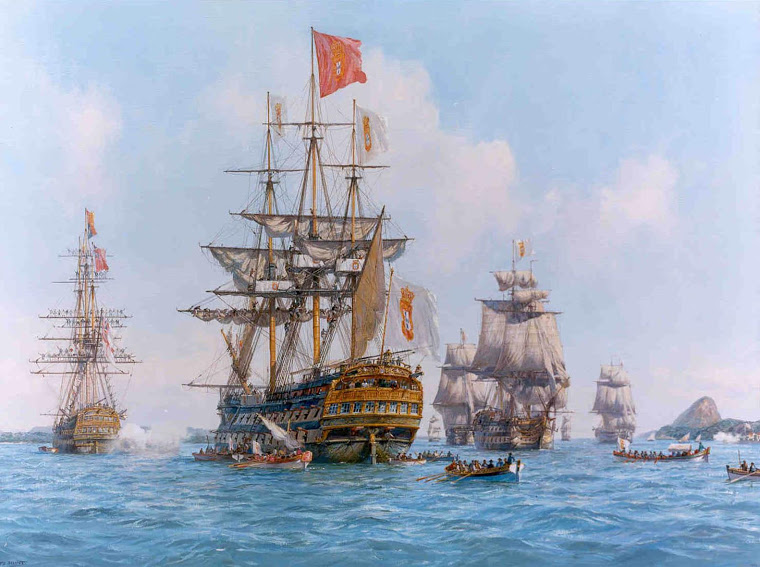
Painting of the Anglo-Portuguese squadron transporting the Portuguese court arriving at Guanabara Bay in 1808 by Geoff Hunt

Boney Stark Mad or More Ships Colonies & Commerce. 1808 political cartoon by Isaac Cruikshank on the transfer of the Portuguese court to Brazil.

On 22 January 1808, Prince John and his court arrived in Salvador, Brazil. There, John signed a decree which opened Brazil's ports, allowing commerce between Brazil and "friendly nations". This was particularly beneficial for Great Britain and can be seen as one of many ways Prince John found to reward Britain for its assistance. This new law, however, broke the colonial pact that had forced Brazil to maintain direct commercial relations with Portugal only. This transformed the Brazilian economy, and subsequently, its demographics and society. Secret negotiations at London in 1807 by Portuguese ambassador Domingos António de Sousa Coutinho guaranteed British military protection in exchange for British access to Brazil's ports and to Madeira as a naval base. Sousa Coutinho's secret negotiations paved the way for John's law to come to fruition in 1808.

On 1 April 1808, in attempts to modernize the economy and diversify the production of the colony, John allowed for the establishment of manufacturing industries through the signing of the Alvará de Liberdade para as Indústrias. This meant that Brazil would no longer only be an agricultural producer. In this decree, John said that in an attempt to promote national wealth and recognize that manufacturing, industrial labor, and multiplication of labor promote means of subsistence for subjects, Brazil should heavily invest in those sectors effective immediately. He abolished any prohibition to industrial development; which expanded the need for labor in the colony, along with attracting foreign investment.

=== The court in the colony ===
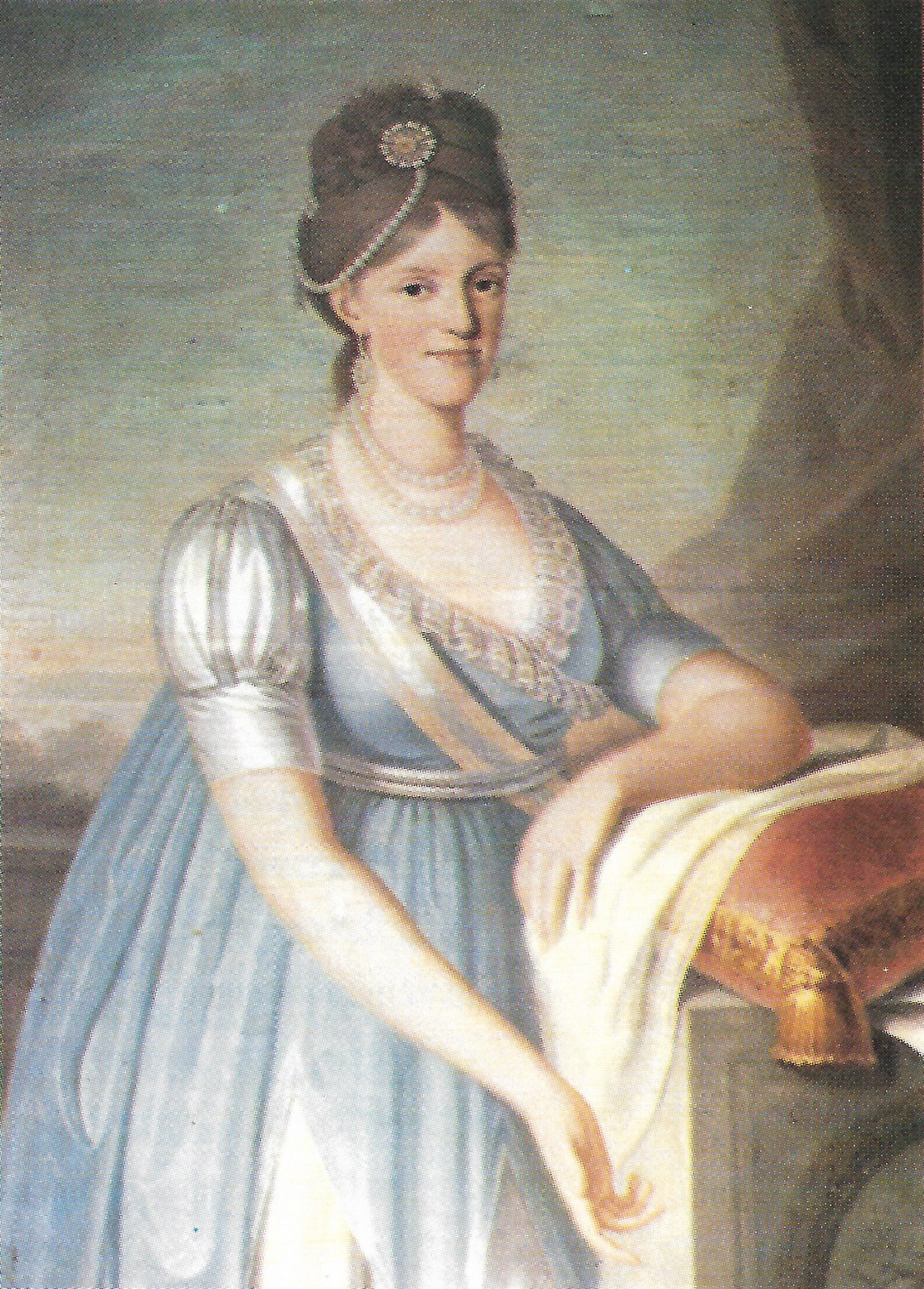
Portrait of Princess Carlota Joaquina, around of the time of the transfer of the court to Brazil

Between 1808 and 1821, John of Braganza, serving as prince regent until 1816 and then as king from 1816 onwards, granted 145 titles of nobility. During the time that the court was located in Brazil, the Portuguese royal family collectively granted more titles of nobility than it had in its past 300 years of existence in Portugal. Much can be said about the motivations for ennobling so many people, and these titles had consequences for the political scene of Brazil, including the systematic isolation of Brazilians from politics. Between 1811 and 1821, a vast majority of noble titles were granted to those who had travelled with the court in 1807 or had fought the French in Portugal and somehow had made their way to Brazil.

As an additional way to thank Great Britain for their efforts to protect the Portuguese Empire and their expanding economic relationship with the colony, titles of nobility were also given to British individuals. Furthermore, the titles of nobility served as a means to consolidate the rule of the Portuguese court and confirm the power status of the monarchy in the colony. When John elevated the status of Brazil from colony to a co-kingdom as the United Kingdom of Portugal, Brazil and the Algarves to participate in the Congress of Vienna away from Europe, there was a sharp increase in the number of titles granted. Not only did this change affect titles of nobility, it also increased the power of the Portuguese in Brazilian affairs. Rio became an important center for world trade and grew immensely, having its demographics changed incessantly. The monarchy, as expected, favored the Portuguese to be in command of political offices, and with the creation of new government positions, departments, and military branches, almost every official was Portuguese.

Out of all 145 titles of nobility granted during this time period, only six were granted to Brazilians. Consistently, Brazilians were given the lowest royal title, that of baron. To somewhat make up for the fact that the Portuguese not only got more titles but also got more prestigious titles that made them more influential with the nobility, Brazilians were also granted land and seats in the Conselho da Fazenda. These were surreptitious ways to keep Brazilians content with the monarchy and appease the population without jeopardizing Portuguese high society, both in Brazil and in Portugal. The first title of nobility granted to a Brazilian was in 1812 to the Baroness of São Salvador de Campos dos Goytacazes. Out of the 26 titles of nobility granted in 1818, only three Brazilian men were graced: José Egídio Álvares de Almeida, Pedro Dias Paes Leme, and Paulo Fernandes Carneiro Viana.

The reason so many noble titles were granted in 1818 is most likely because that was the year John was crowned king, with 17 noble titles being granted on the day of his coronation. As it can be expected, these titles did not benefit Brazilians much and did not create tight bonds between Brazilians and the new nobility. It was a reality unknown to many, even the wealthiest Brazilians. An argument can be made of this: titles of nobility were made exclusively for Europeans to preserve the contrast in power and superiority of Europeans in Brazil. By granting titles to Portuguese individuals and those with close ties with Portugal, the court guaranteed the financial support to sustain themselves halfway across the Atlantic.

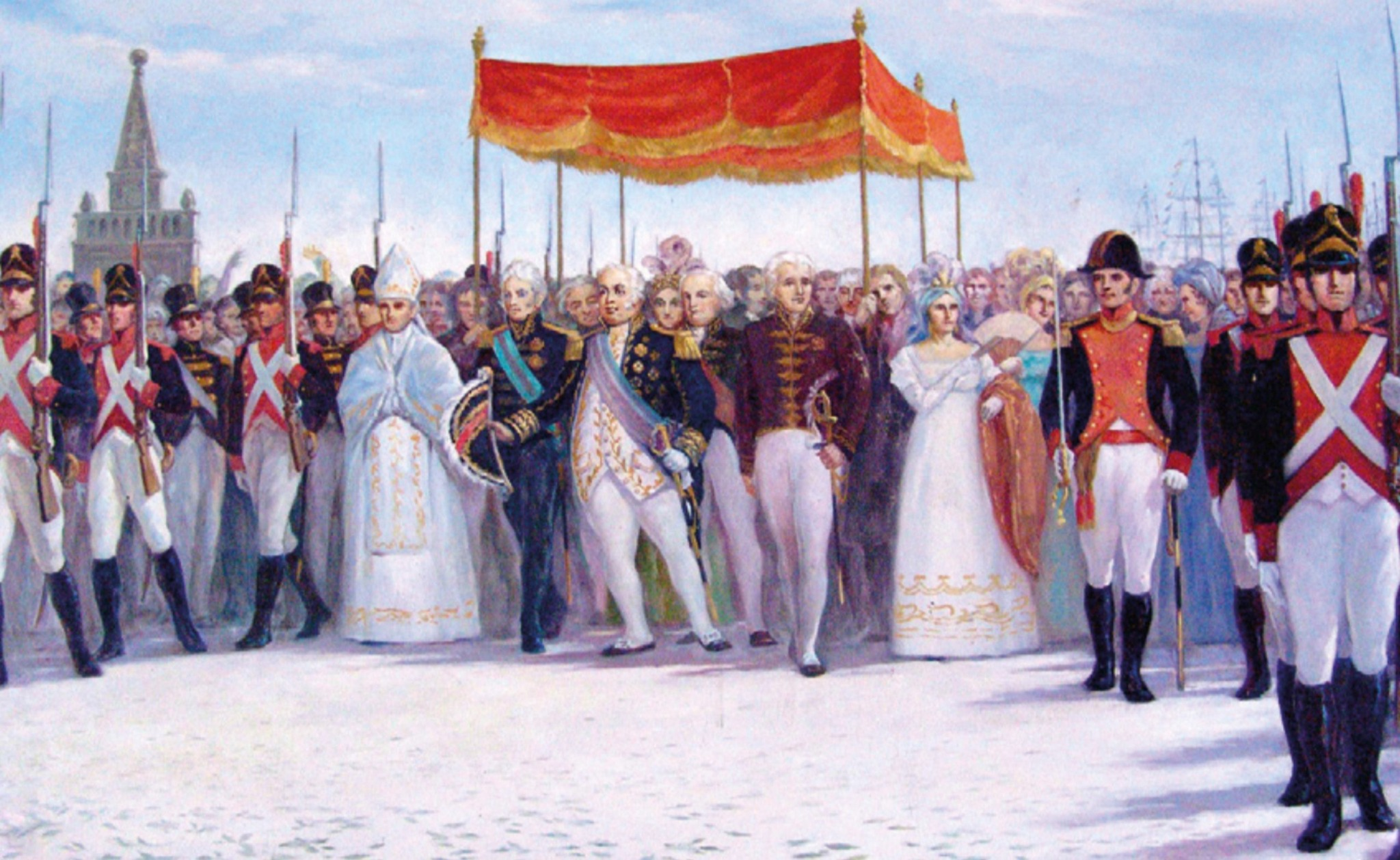
Illustration of the Portuguese court's arrival in Rio de Janeiro on 7 March 1808

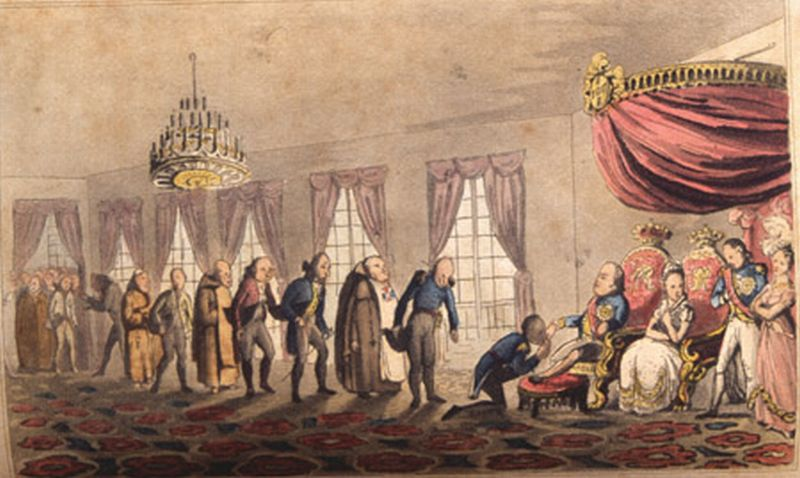
Illustration of the beija-mão ceremony

Importantly, this meant an increase in the demand for slave labor. With the end of the colonial pact, the coffee industry boomed and the sugar industry continued to flourish. Now, being able to manufacture goods, the naval and iron industries started to develop. The arrival of enslaved individuals increased dramatically during the period that the court was in Brazil and then during the decade following their absence, with the arrival of approximately 328,000 enslaved individuals to Brazil. This drastically changed the demographics of Brazil and of Rio, where most of these enslaved individuals would arrive and remain. It is estimated that the enslaved population in Rio, at its height, was more than half of the total population. After the successful slave revolution that took place in Haiti a few years before, the court started to worry about the small elites regarding potential rebellion and revolution. This led to the creation of the Military Division of the Guarda Real de Polícia, or Royal Police Guard, in charge of urban policing that before the arrival of the royal family consisted of informal guards, watchmen, and sentinels. This further isolated and oppressed enslaved peoples and was the beginning of a phenomenon that proceeded in the 19th and 20th centuries of the criminalization of poverty. It reemphasized racial discrimination on an official level and associated disorder with lack of money and social ascension. This is also when King John VI decreed the establishment of a mounted guard.

In addition, the penal system was used to take control of lower classes by using minor infractions considered public disorder; for example, "disrespecting curfew, playing games of luck, drinking alcohol and begging" could be punishable with prison. Furthermore, while attempts to "civilize" the city were made, it also meant that the biggest difference between the old court and the one in Brazil was that half of it now consisted of enslaved peoples. Slavery was not legal in Portugal but allowed in the New World, and continued for several decades even after Brazil achieved independence from Portugal.

Imperial relocation also meant the stratification of hierarchy. Those who were already rich, usually because of their connections to nobility, got richer (usually for the same reasons they had been rich in the first place) and the poorer got even poorer, now having to compete for resources, services, and physical space. With the Portuguese government now in Brazil, Portuguese immigration retention increased and this led to further disapproval of Cariocas (the term given to those native to the city of Rio de Janeiro). While the court and nobility wanted to portray itself as open to hearing the critiques and desires of the Brazilian population, only a select few could attend audiences with King John. He implemented the ceremony of beija-mão, a daily ritual where subjects got the chance to go to the royal residence, kiss the king's hand, and express their grievances. This practice to supposedly stay in touch with common people allowed for the social elites to voice their agendas, including white men, the nobility, and the clergy.

== Brazil as a kingdom ==
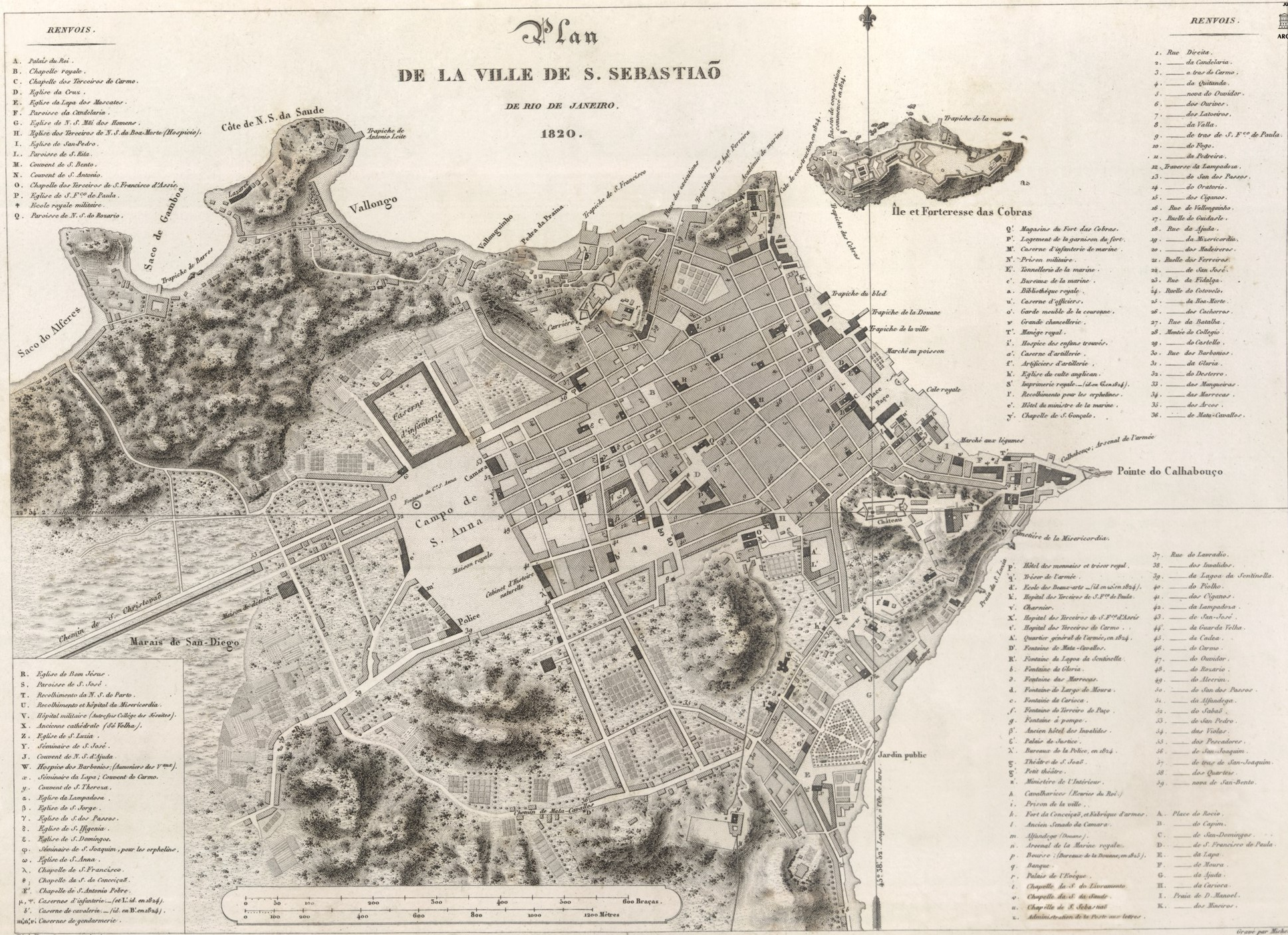
Map of the city of Rio de Janeiro in 1820, then capital of the Kingdom of Portugal, with the transfer of the court to Brazil.

On 16 December 1815, John created the United Kingdom of Portugal, Brazil and the Algarves (Reino Unido de Portugal, Brasil e Algarves), elevating Brazil to the same rank as Portugal and increasing the administrative independence of Brazil. Brazilian representatives were elected to the Portuguese Constitutional Courts (Cortes Constitucionais Portuguesas). In 1815, in the aftermath of Napoleon's defeat and the meeting of the Congress of Vienna, convened to restore European political arrangements, the Portuguese monarch declared Brazil a co-equal to Portugal to increase Portugal's bargaining power. In 1816, with the death of Queen Maria, Prince John became king of the United Kingdom of Portugal, Brazil and the Algarves. After several delays, the ceremony of his acclamation took place in Rio de Janeiro in 1818.

Beyond having to go through infrastructural expansion to accommodate for the arrival of 15,000 people, Rio continued to be modified and upgraded in the early stages of the transferring of the court. The city lacked basic sanitation and structured sewer systems. There were very few roads. The goal was to "construct an ideal city; a city in which both mundane and monumental architecture, together with its residents’ social and cultural practices projected an unequivocally powerful and virtuous image of royal authority and government." The city had to reflect the flourishing of the empire and institutions like public libraries, botanic gardens, opera houses, palaces and government buildings were created. Rio was to be modern and secure. Architecture physically changed to reflect modern times.

Furthermore, before the arrival of the royal family and court, Brazil consisted of very disconnected conglomerates of people. Vast amounts of empty land and dense tropical forest separated cities like Rio de Janeiro, São Paulo, Salvador, Pernambuco, Rio Grande, and Porto Alegre. Needing to create a unified way to control the state and effectively manage territory, the government put in efforts to connect city centers through road development. The monarchy also encouraged internal trade. The isolation of cities had once been used by the Portuguese Empire to keep Brazilians subordinate and unable to organize against the crown. Now, having to manage the territory directly, that was no longer useful. All of these infrastructural developments came at the cost of slaves’ hard work and lives. It is estimated that between 1808 and 1822, "Rio’s slave population increased by 200 percent. As a consequence, remaking Rio de Janeiro into the court meant reconciling the larger quest to metropolitanise the city with slavery and with the African and African-Brazilian residents who made up the majority of its population."

Among the important measures taken by John VI (in attempts to Europeanize the country) were creating incentives for commerce and industry, allowing newspapers and books to be printed, even though the Imprensa Régia, Brazil's first printing press was highly regulated by the government, establishing two medical schools, establishing military academies, and creating the first Bank of Brazil (Banco do Brasil). In Rio de Janeiro, he also established a powder factory, a botanical garden, an art academy, and an opera house. All these measures advanced Brazil's independence from Portugal. Less beneficial were the crown's policies continuing the Atlantic slave trade, attacks on indigenous peoples, and land grants to court favorites. He blocked the entry of ideas of political independence expressed in the U.S. and the former Spanish American colonies, now independent republics. Britain's influence in Brazil increased, with favorable terms of trade, but also extraterritoriality for British merchants.

Owing to the absence of the King and the economic independence of Brazil, Portugal entered a severe political crisis that obliged John VI and the royal family to return to Portugal on 25 April 1821; otherwise he risked loss of his Portuguese throne. The heir of John VI, Pedro I, remained in Brazil. The Portuguese Cortes demanded that Brazil return to its former status as a colony and the return of the heir to Portugal. Prince Pedro, influenced by the Rio de Janeiro Municipal Senate (Senado da Câmara), refused to return to Portugal during the Dia do Fico (9 January 1822). Brazil declared its independence on 7 September 1822, forming the Empire of Brazil and ending 322 years of colonial dominance of Portugal over Brazil. Pedro was crowned the first emperor in Rio de Janeiro on 12 October 1822, taking the name Dom Pedro I.

== Aftermath ==
The Portuguese court's tenure in Rio de Janeiro created the conditions which led to Brazil's independence. With the court's arrival, Rio de Janeiro saw an immediate increase in its population. This, coupled with increases in trade and subsequent immigration, transformed the city into a major economic center in the New World. In 1815, this resulted in Brazil being declared a co-kingdom with Portugal, raising it from its former colonial status. This was an embodiment of Brazil's growing independence from Portugal, which intensified after the royal family's return to Europe in 1821.

The relocation of the Portuguese nobility and administrative core to Brazil in 1808 had tremendous ramifications and resulted in a multi-faceted approach to change. Brazilian politics were initiated and affected, society and demographics were altered, the economy developed, and the city of Rio de Janeiro physically changed. The impact was felt in different ways and degrees by different sections of the population: nobility, wealthy families, Brazilians, indigenous peoples, and enslaved Africans. The stability and prosperity of the Brazilian state, resulting from the royal court's presence, allowed for it to declare independence from Portugal without the violence and destabilization characteristic of similar movements in neighboring countries.

This was in part because its burgeoning independent identity had had an effect on Pedro, King John's oldest son and first emperor of Brazil. Pedro was nine years old when the family fled Portugal, meaning he was raised in Rio de Janeiro. Coming of age in Brazil rather than Portugal led to Pedro identifying as a Brazilian, a sentiment which influenced his defiance of the Cortes in 1821. Due to his position as heir of the Portuguese crown, Pedro was able to prevent any serious efforts on the part of the Portuguese to retake Brazil. The relatively smooth transition into independence, along with the economic and cultural strides made since the royal court's first arrival, resulted in a thriving time for the young nation. Throughout the royal court's stay in Rio de Janeiro and during the early part of its independence, Brazil saw a huge influx of immigrants and imported slaves.

The immigrants were largely young Portuguese, the majority of whom elected to stay in Brazil permanently, rather than return to Portugal. This migration also mirrored a period of political upheaval in Portugal, wherein the loss of Brazil started a series of revolts. The retention of immigrants demonstrated the newfound economic opportunities of the newly independent Brazil, while waves of anti-Portuguese sentiment among the masses of Rio de Janeiro revealed the nation's lingering resentment towards its former rulers.

== See also ==
- Free French Africa
- Timeline of the Peninsular War
- Secret Convention on the Transfer of the Portuguese monarchy to Brazil
