= Captaincy of Maranhão =

Former territorial division of Brazil (1534-1621)

Captaincy of Maranhão Capitania do Maranhão
- 1534-1621
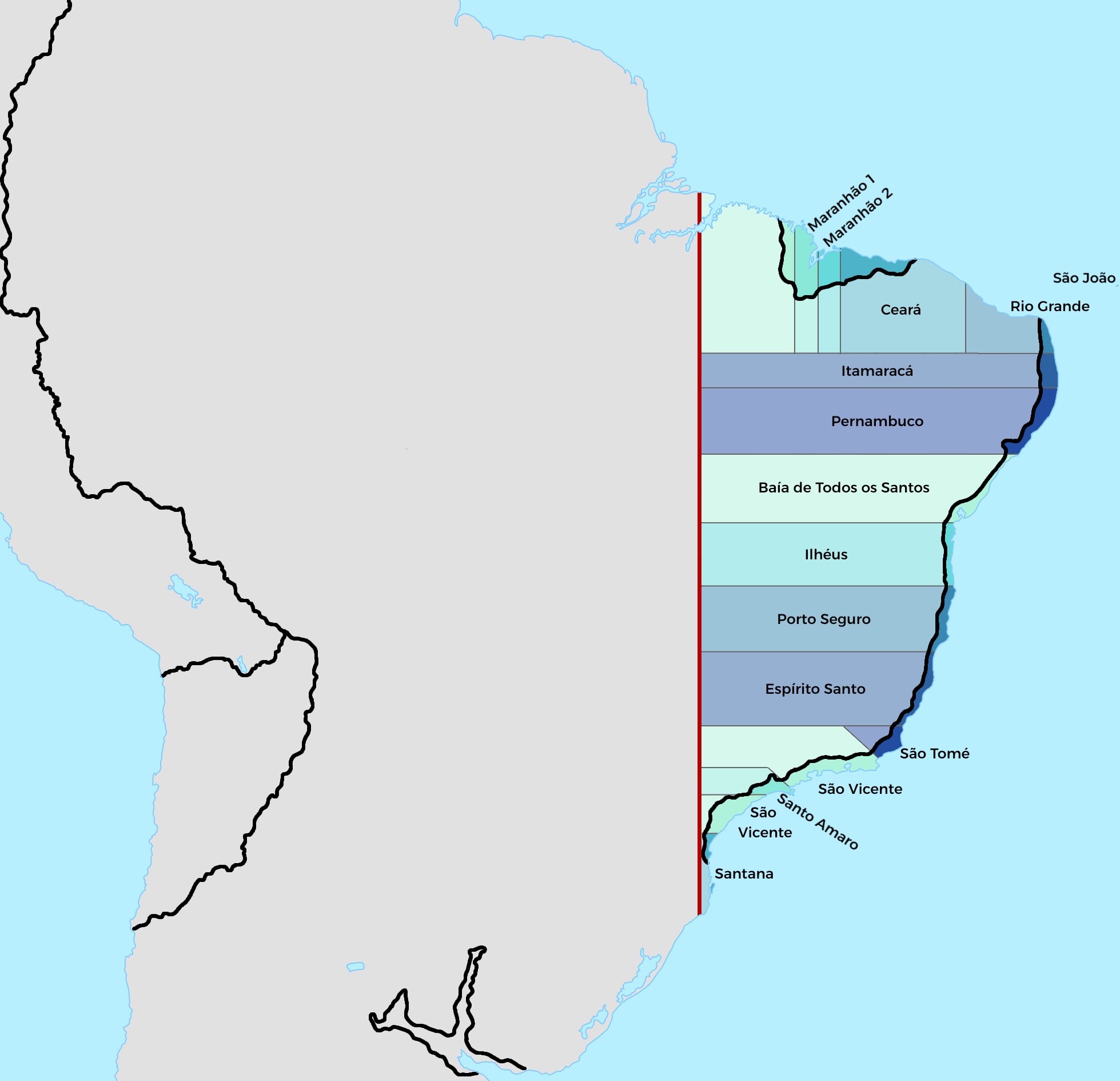
- Map of Brazil in 1534
- Official languages: Portuguese
- Religion: Catholicism
- Government: Absolute monarchy
  - First donatários: João de Barros and Aires da Cunha (1st section); Fernando Álvares de Andrade (2nd section)
- Today part of: Brazil

The Captaincy of Maranhão (Portuguese: Capitania do Maranhão) was one of the administrative subdivisions of the Brazilian territory during the colonial period in Portuguese America. It was created in 1534 along with thirteen other hereditary captaincies and granted by John III, King of Portugal, to the so-called donatários.

The Captaincy of Maranhão included the northeast of the current state of Maranhão, the eastern part of the state of Pará (now Belém) and the island of Marajó, and was divided into two sections, with Aires da Cunha and João de Barros holding the first and Fernando Álvares de Andrade the second.

== History ==
=== Background ===
European colonization in America effectively began in 1534, when King John III divided the territory into fourteen hereditary captaincies and gave them to twelve donatários, who could exploit the land's resources, but in exchange had to populate and protect the regions. Since the 15th century, the system of captaincies had been used by the Portuguese Empire on the islands of Madeira and Cape Verde. In a letter addressed to Martim Afonso de Sousa in 1532, John III announced the decision to divide the Portuguese territory, beginning the donations in 1534.

There are three possible factors for the adoption of the captaincy system in Brazil: a response by the Portuguese monarchy to France's threat to its project of domination in America; the transfer of expenses with colonization from Portugal to the donatários, favoring the Crown in a situation of limited resources; and the conversion of the native population to Christianity, continuing the ideal of the Crusades.

=== Origins ===
In 1535, João de Barros and Aires da Cunha were honored with the possession of two captaincies: the Captaincy of Rio Grande and the Captaincy of Maranhão. In November 1535, a fleet of ten ships, with 900 men and over a hundred horses, commanded by Aires da Cunha, experienced in the conquests of the Orient, set sail from the Tagus for Brazil. João de Barros, Aires' partner in the expedition, sent two of his sons, Jerónimo and João, as his representatives. The large fleet headed first for Pernambuco, where Duarte Coelho welcomed the expeditionaries and provided them with information and interpreters, as well as a rowing boat to survey the coast, in order to prevent the ships from crashing into shallows or reaching deep anchorages.

On the way from Cape São Roque to the Maranhão River, the ship Capitania was shipwrecked and Aires da Cunha died, but the remaining ships reached the estuary and landed on the island of Trindade. There, they built a castle and established a colony which they named Nazareth. In 1538, the territory was abandoned by the donatários, who tried to occupy the area again in 1554, under the command of Luís Melo. The French privateers, however, frequently visited the region, which forced the Crown to reconquer the region at the beginning of the 17th century, expelling the invaders in 1615.

The first 100 leagues north of the border of the Captaincy of Itamaracá, corresponding to the Captaincy of Rio Grande, belonged to Aires da Cunha and João de Barros and included the current states of Paraíba and Rio Grande do Norte. The next 40 leagues belonged to Antônio Cardoso de Barros, donatário of the Captaincy of Ceará, and covered the current state of Ceará and part of Piauí. The following 75 leagues covered the 2nd section of the Captaincy of Maranhão, which belonged to Fernando Álvares de Andrade and included part of Piauí and Maranhão. The last 50 leagues referred to the 1st section of the Captaincy of Maranhão that had been granted to Aires da Cunha and João de Barros and covered parts of Maranhão and Pará.

=== Dissolution ===
In 1621, the territory of Portuguese America was divided by Philip III of Spain into two autonomous administrative units: the State of Maranhão to the north, with its capital in São Luís, covering the Captaincy of Grão-Pará, the Captaincy of Maranhão and the Captaincy of Ceará, in order to secure possession of the territory and promote development; and the State of Brazil to the south, whose capital was Salvador, and included the other captaincies.

== See also ==
- Captaincy of Grão-Pará
- State of Grão-Pará and Maranhão
- Captaincy of Cumã
