= Louis Henri Loison =

French general (1771-1816)

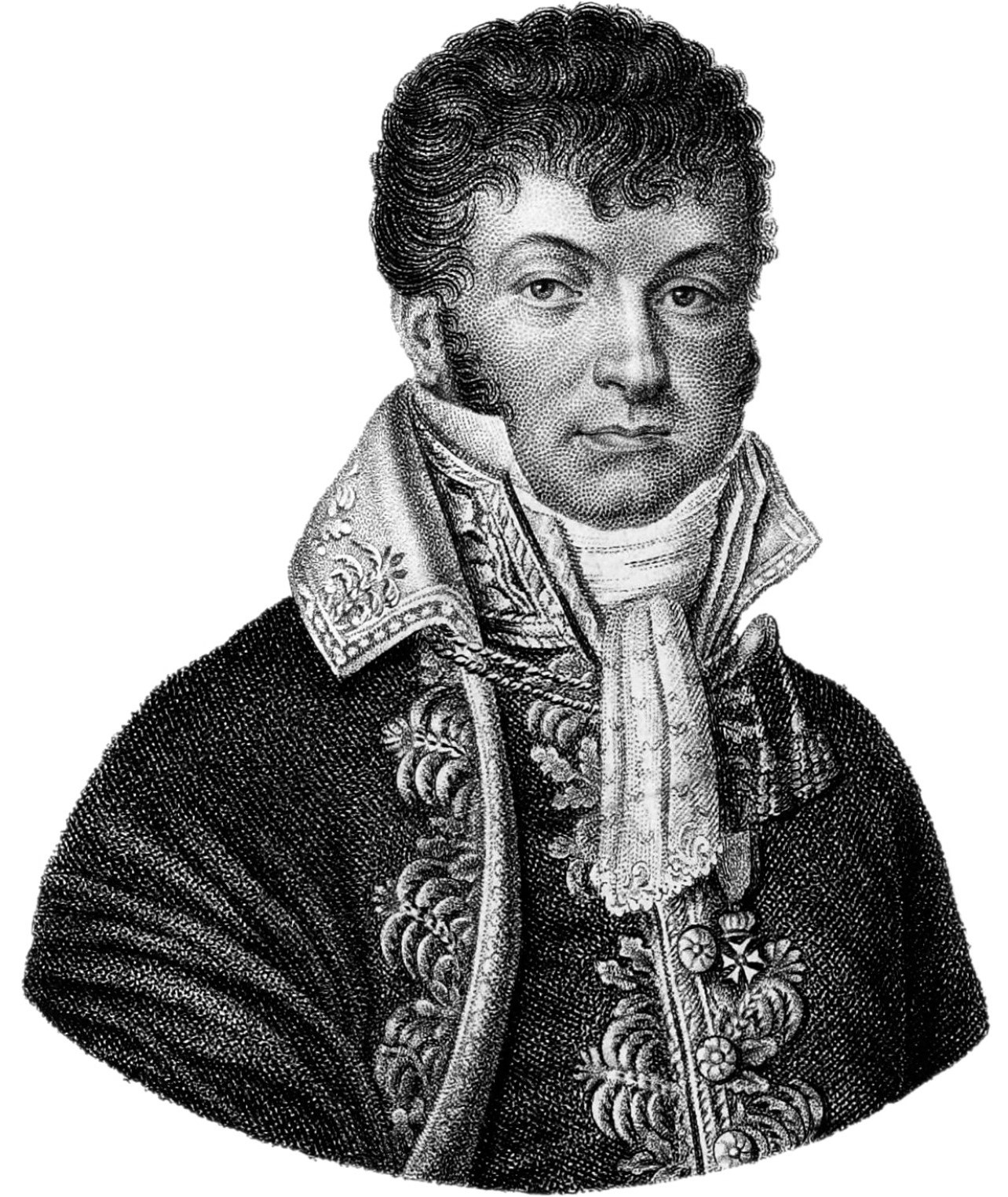
- Louis Henri Loison
- Nickname: "Maneta"
- Born: 16 May 1771; Damvillers, France
- Died: 30 December 1816 (aged 45) Chokier, present-day Belgium
- Allegiance: France
- Branch: Infantry
- Service years: 1791–1815
- Rank: General of Division
- Conflicts: French Revolutionary Wars; Napoleonic Wars; • Siege of Kolberg; • Combat of Padrões de Teixeira; • Battle of Évora; • Battle of the Bridge of Amarante; • Battle of the Côa
- Awards: Légion d'Honneur, Grand Officer

Louis Henri Loison (French pronunciation: [lwi ɑ̃ʁi lwazɔ̃]; 16 May 1771 – 30 December 1816) briefly joined the French Army in 1787 and after the French Revolution became a junior officer. Blessed with military talent and courage, he rapidly rose to general officer rank during the French Revolutionary Wars. He got into difficulties because of his fondness for plundering. In late 1795 he helped Napoleon Bonaparte crush a revolt against the government. After a hiatus, he returned in 1799 to fight in Switzerland where he earned another promotion. In 1800 he commanded a division under Napoleon in the Marengo campaign.

In 1805, Loison led a division in Napoleon's Grande Armée during the Ulm campaign and served in the War of the Fourth Coalition in 1806 and 1807. He saw much action in the Peninsular War including all three invasions of Portugal, though not always with distinction. In Portugal he earned a bad name for his harshness and the inhabitants called him Maneta or One-Hand. For a brief period, he commanded Michel Ney's famous VI Corps. During the French invasion of Russia he assembled a reserve division, which was later destroyed by the extreme cold weather. He served in the War of the Sixth Coalition before a harsh rebuke from the emperor effectively ended his military career. Loison is one of the names inscribed under the Arc de Triomphe.

== Revolution ==
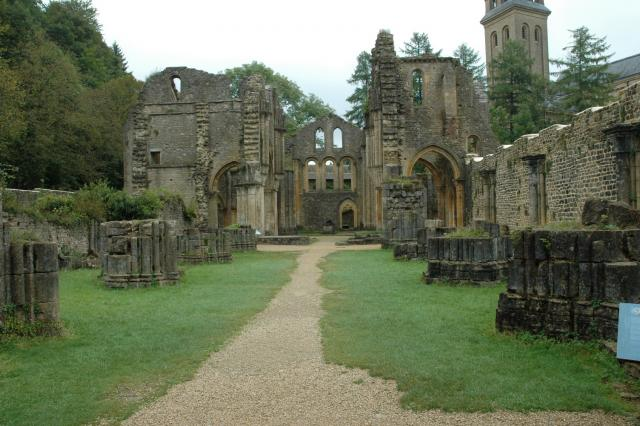
Ruins of Orval Abbey

Born on 16 May 1771 in Damvillers, France in what later became the department of Meuse, Loison briefly enlisted in a colonial battalion on 29 June 1787. However, he left the unit in September and when he returned on 25 January 1788, he was immediately granted leave. After the outbreak of the French Revolution, his father served as a Deputy in the Constituent Assembly. He was appointed sous-lieutenant in the Meuse Volunteer Battalion on 15 September 1791 and became lieutenant in 1792. Several months later, he emerged as captain of hussars in the Légion du Nord. In May 1793, the Representative-on-mission of the Army of the North promoted him to adjutant general (a rank equivalent to colonel) for bravery. This appointment was later confirmed.

On 16 October 1793 at the Battle of Wattignies, he accompanied the 3,500-man column of Jacob Job Élie on the far right flank of the army. In the middle of the night, the outposts were attacked by the Austrians and the untried foot soldiers took to their heels. Élie managed to rally his men but Johann Andreas Benjowski's Austrians launched an assault in a heavy fog at dawn. The second line panicked and fired into the backs of the first line, whereupon the infantry bolted again, throwing away their muskets in order to run faster. They might have been butchered but for Loison who led the cavalry to the rescue and fought off the pursuit. French losses were 400 soldiers and 12 artillery pieces while the Austrians lost 138 men in the clash. French historian Charles Mullié noted that while Loison was a talented soldier who exhibited extreme bravery, he also had a dark side. Mullié suggested that Loison was an avid plunderer. Notorious for the sacking and destruction of the Orval Abbey in the Grand Duchy of Luxemburg and other acts, Loison was arrested by agents of the government. However, he escaped trial when one of the commissioners allowed him to return to military service.

On 26 August 1795, he was promoted to brigade general in the Army of Rhin-et-Moselle. When royalist sympathizers tried to overthrow the French Directory on 13 Vendémiaire (5 October 1795) and Napoleon Bonaparte dispersed them with his cannon, Loison supported his colleague. After the revolt was put down, he served on the court convened to try the rebel leaders. He was unemployed for a few years then re-entered military service in January 1799. Serving under André Masséna and Claude Lecourbe, Loison commanded a brigade in numerous small actions in Switzerland. He led a brigade at Maienfeld on 6 March 1799, Chur on 7 March, La Punt on 12 March, Martinsbruck on 14 and 17 March, Nauders on 25 March, Ramosch on 30 April, and Susch on 2 May. In independent command of his brigade, he received a drubbing at the hands of Franz Xaver Saint-Julien's numerically superior Austrian division at the valley called Urseren on 29 May. The defeat was avenged by Lecourbe and Loison two days later at Wasen.

After two months of inaction, Loison again led his command in actions at Schwyz on 14 August, Silenen (Amsteg) on 15–16 August, the Gotthard Pass on 23–27 September, and Schwanden on 5 October. His temporary appointment as general of division was confirmed in October 1799. In 1800, Loison was posted to the Army of the Reserve to command a 5,300-man division and crossed the Great St Bernard Pass with Napoleon. He was wounded leading a failed assault on Fort Bard on 25 May 1800. Quickly recovering, he led his division in Guillaume Philibert Duhesme's corps in driving back Josef Philipp Vukassovich's command. He missed the Battle of Marengo because his men were busy capturing Milan and Cremona, while pursuing the Austrians eastward.

== Early Empire ==
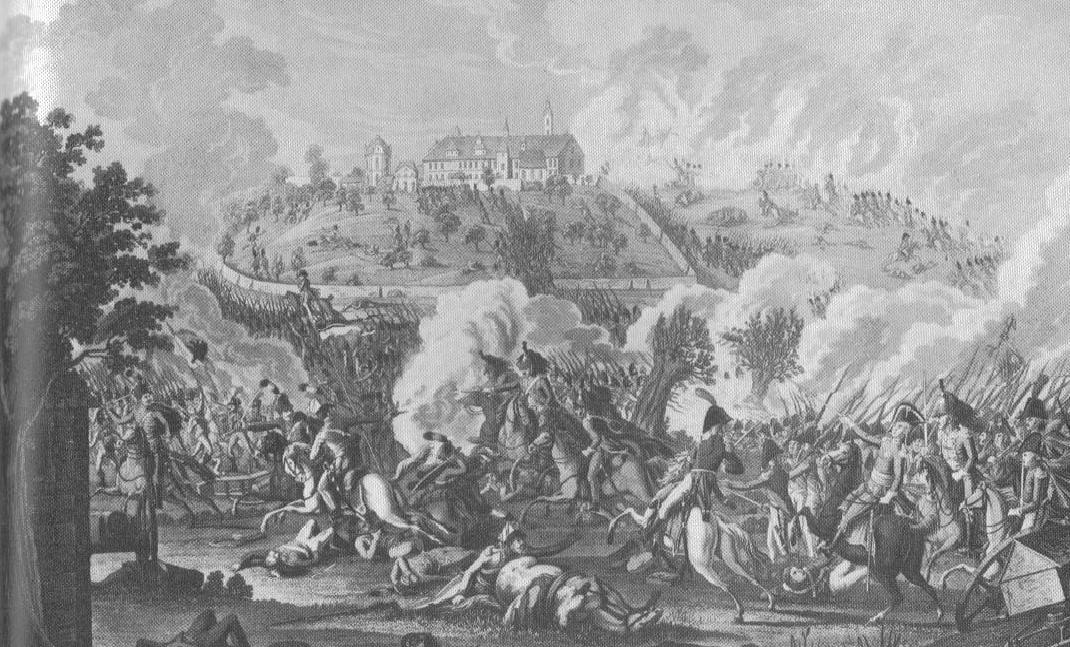
Battle of Elchingen from an engraving by Johann Lorenz Rugendas (1775–1826). French infantry storm the abbey while dragoons chase fleeing Austrians.

Loison became a Grand Officer of the Légion d'honneur on 14 June 1804. During the Ulm campaign in 1805, he served in the VI Corps under Marshal Michel Ney at the Battle of Elchingen. Austrian general Johann Sigismund Riesch held Elchingen with a force numbering 8,000 soldiers, including 14 battalions, 11 squadrons, and 12 guns.

The Austrians deployed on a ridge on the north bank of the Danube River, overlooking a partially destroyed bridge. At 8:00 AM, Ney sent Loison's division into the attack from the south bank. Loison ordered the elite companies of Eugène-Casimir Villatte's brigade to seize the span, which was quickly accomplished. An Austrian attempt to drive back the French with two battalions and four guns failed. After the engineers repaired the bridge, three French battalions from Loison's division rushed across and hurled themselves at Riesch's defenses, supported by ten guns. The 6th Light Infantry Regiment captured the abbey and Ober-Elchingen, but the 1st Battalion of the 39th Line Infantry Regiment was defeated by Austrian cavalry. The French light cavalry entered the fray, charging the enemy cavalry and infantry, and allowing Loison to bring up his second brigade, which was led by François Roguet.

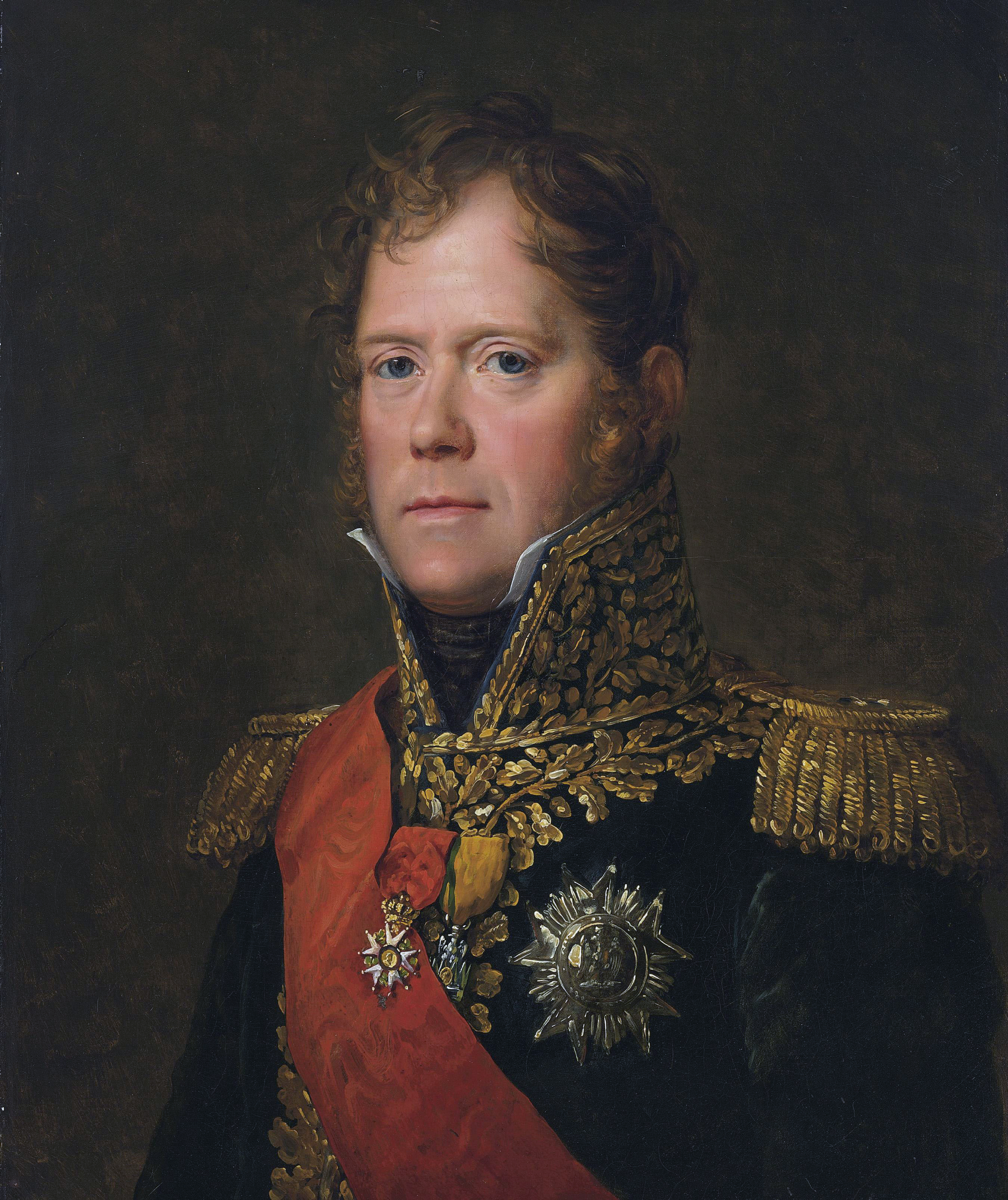
Marshal Michel Ney

Loison's 69th Line Infantry Regiment attacked the Austrian right flank, driving the Austrians back into the woods and seizing some cannons. Meanwhile, the 76th Line Infantry and 18th Dragoon Regiments crushed an Austrian square and captured two guns. Riesch threw all his remaining cavalry into a grand charge, but it was repulsed by Roguet's brigade. The remnants of Riesch's wrecked corps fled back to Ulm after sustaining losses of 6,000 men killed, wounded, or captured. The French casualties totalled 54 officers and 800 rank and file.

After destroying the Austrian army of Karl Mack von Leiberich, Emperor Napoleon directed the VI Corps south to prevent Archduke Charles from crossing from Italy to the Danube valley. Accordingly, Ney attempted to fight his way through the mountain passes on 4 November. At Scharnitz the Austrian defenders repelled the French with 800 casualties. However, Loison's 69th Line redeemed the situation at Leutasch, capturing 600 of their enemies and outflanking the position at Scharnitz. The VI Corps reached Innsbruck on 7 May. Together with Auguste Marmont's II Corps at Leoben, Ney's position dissuaded Archduke Charles from attempting to push northward.

On 5 February 1806 while resting at Venetian estates Loison was involved in a hunting accident, which resulted in his left arm being amputated

During the War of the Fourth Coalition, Loison assumed command of a division in Marshal Édouard Mortier's VIII Corps. Napoleon planned for Mortier and his brother King Louis Bonaparte of Holland to wipe out the small state of Hesse-Kassel because he knew its ruler was hostile to France. Mortier advanced from the south with Loison's three French light infantry regiments which numbered 5,500 men. On 1 November 1806, the French seized the city of Kassel without resistance and were soon joined by Louis' troops. Leaving Louis' Dutch division to undertake the Siege of Hameln, Mortier went on to occupy the city of Hanover. In 1807 Loison participated in the unsuccessful Siege of Kolberg. During the siege he commanded the 1st Battalion of the 3rd Light Infantry Regiment, five battalions divided between the 19th, 72nd, and 93rd Line Infantry Regiments, eight squadrons of the 3rd and 15th Chasseurs à Cheval, one Dragoon squadron, and two companies of Gensdarmes.

== Later Empire ==
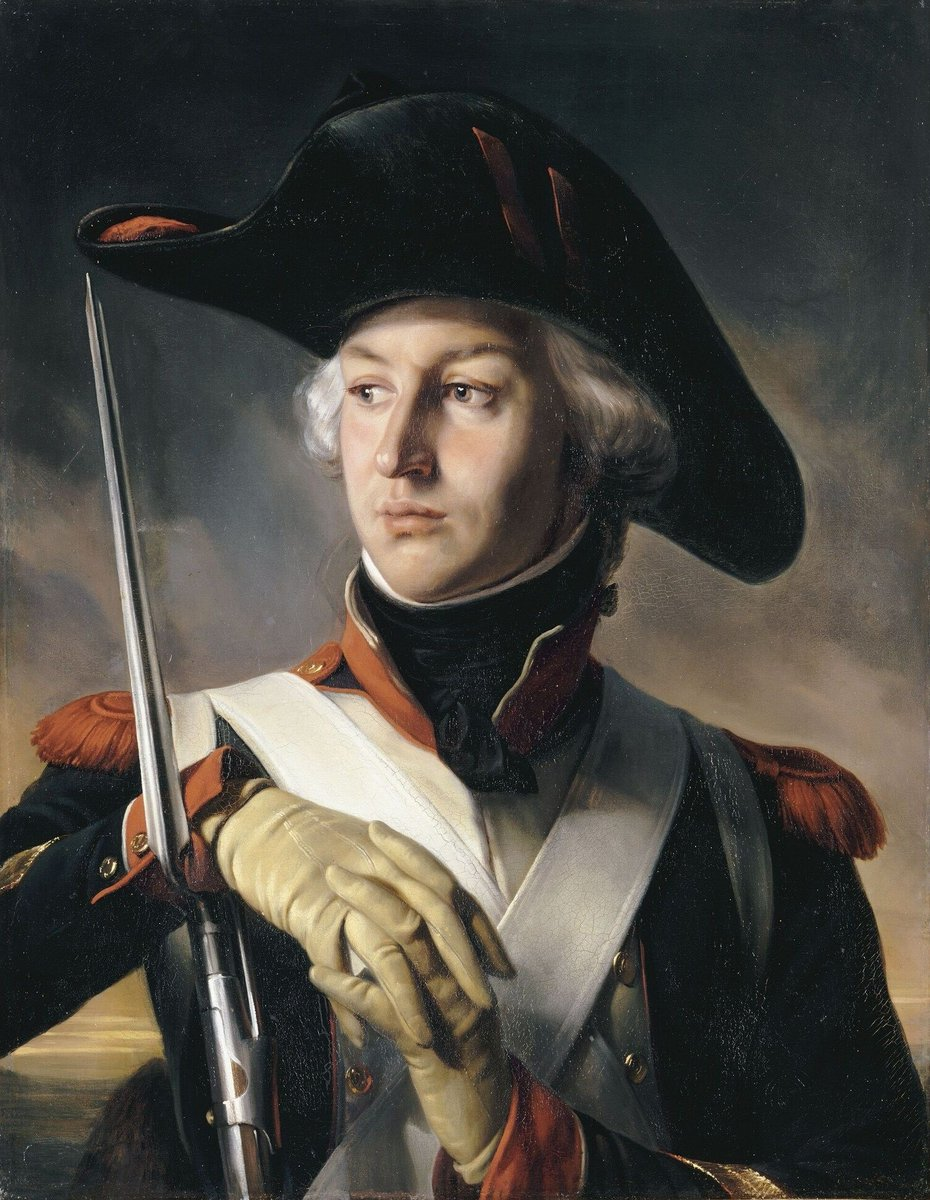
Jean-Andoche Junot

Loison commanded a division in Jean-Andoche Junot's Invasion of Portugal in 1807. After first Spain and then Portugal rose in revolt, the position of Junot's 26,000 French troops became difficult. Ordered by Napoleon to send troops to Almeida, Portugal and open communications with Marshal Jean-Baptiste Bessières, Junot sent Loison with a brigade on this mission. Loison occupied Almeida and marched against Ciudad Rodrigo, chasing off the small Spanish garrison of Fort Conception. But on 12 June 1808 he found Ciudad Rodrigo held by a powerful force and the Spanish countryside in revolt against the French. He quickly fell back on Almeida, reaching there on the 15th. Hearing that the revolt had spread to northern Portugal, he set out for Porto with 2,000 men. On his way there he was severely harassed by Portuguese guerillas and had to turn back.

In view of the situation, Junot decided to abandon the north and south of the country and concentrate his army in central Portugal. He ordered Loison to leave a garrison in Almeida and march to Lisbon. Maximilien Sébastien Foy claimed that only one of twenty messages got through. Culling from his ranks all the troops unfit to march, he made up a garrison of 1,200 men to hold Almeida. Leaving the garrison behind, he put the rest of his men on the road on 4 July. He successfully fought his way through partisan ambushes for a week and lost 200 men. When Guarda resisted, the place was sacked and partly burned down. His troops left such a path of destruction that Loison became feared and hated in Portugal as Maneta or One-Hand. That Loison was missing one hand is shown by an incident that occurred before the First Battle of Porto in March 1809. The day before the battle Foy was captured by a Portuguese outpost and led into the city. Believing he was the reviled Loison, the mob was about to murder their prisoner when Foy held up both hands, proving he was not Maneta and was spared. (Note: The sources do not state when or how Loison lost one hand.)

On 25 July 1808, Junot sent Loison to relieve Elvas with more than 7,000 troops. His command included two grenadier battalions, the 3rd Battalions of the 12th and 15th Light and the 58th Line Infantry Regiments, the 1st Hanoverian Legion, 12 companies of the 86th Line, the 4th and 5th Provisional Dragoons, and eight artillery pieces. On 29 July 1808, Loison and his small army crushed a Portuguese-Spanish force in the Battle of Évora. General Francisco de Paula Leite de Sousa's Portuguese troops included one and one-half battalions of raw regular infantry and one squadron cavalry. Leite was joined by Colonel Moretti Spanish troops, one-half battalions of regular foot soldiers and the Maria Luisa Hussar Regiment. Altogether, Leite controlled 2,900 soldiers and seven guns. Leite and Moretti unwisely drew up their outnumbered troops in the open in front of the town. Behind them, townsmen and country people armed with pikes and hunting guns manned the crumbling old walls of Évora.

In the face of Loison's first assault, Leite's and Moretti's men took to their heels. The Spanish hussars bolted without even attempting to stop the French charge. Leite fled, but most of his men ran back to the town and tried to defend the place. The French troops were able to fight their way into the town at a number of places. In the butchery that followed, at least 2,000 Portuguese and Spanish fell, including many townspeople. French losses were 90 killed and 200 wounded. After the killing stopped, the French soldiers thoroughly sacked Évora. According to one account, the French massacred the town's entire population. Whatever the exact truth, the atrocity made it easier for the proud Portuguese to accept British aid in their struggle. Loison continued east to drive the Portuguese away from Elvas before being ordered back to Lisbon to face a new threat.

Arthur Wellesley landed with a British army at Figueira da Foz near the end of July and pressed south. On 21 August 1808, Junot attacked Wellesley's numerically superior army in the Battle of Vimeiro. Loison's division included three battalions of Jean-Baptiste Solignac's brigade and two battalions of Hugues Charlot's brigade, a total of 4,140 bayonets. The French commander planned to hurl Loison's division and Jean Guillaume Barthélemy Thomières' brigade of Henri François Delaborde's division at Vimeiro village while sending Delaborde's second brigade under Antoine François Brenier to envelop the British left flank. After reconsidering, Junot detached Solignac's men from Loison and also sent them against the British left, without bothering to inform Brenier. The French attacks were defeated one after another. Junot even committed his grenadier reserve and saw it repulsed as well. In the subsequent Convention of Sintra, the French agreed to evacuate Portugal if the British transported them back to France.

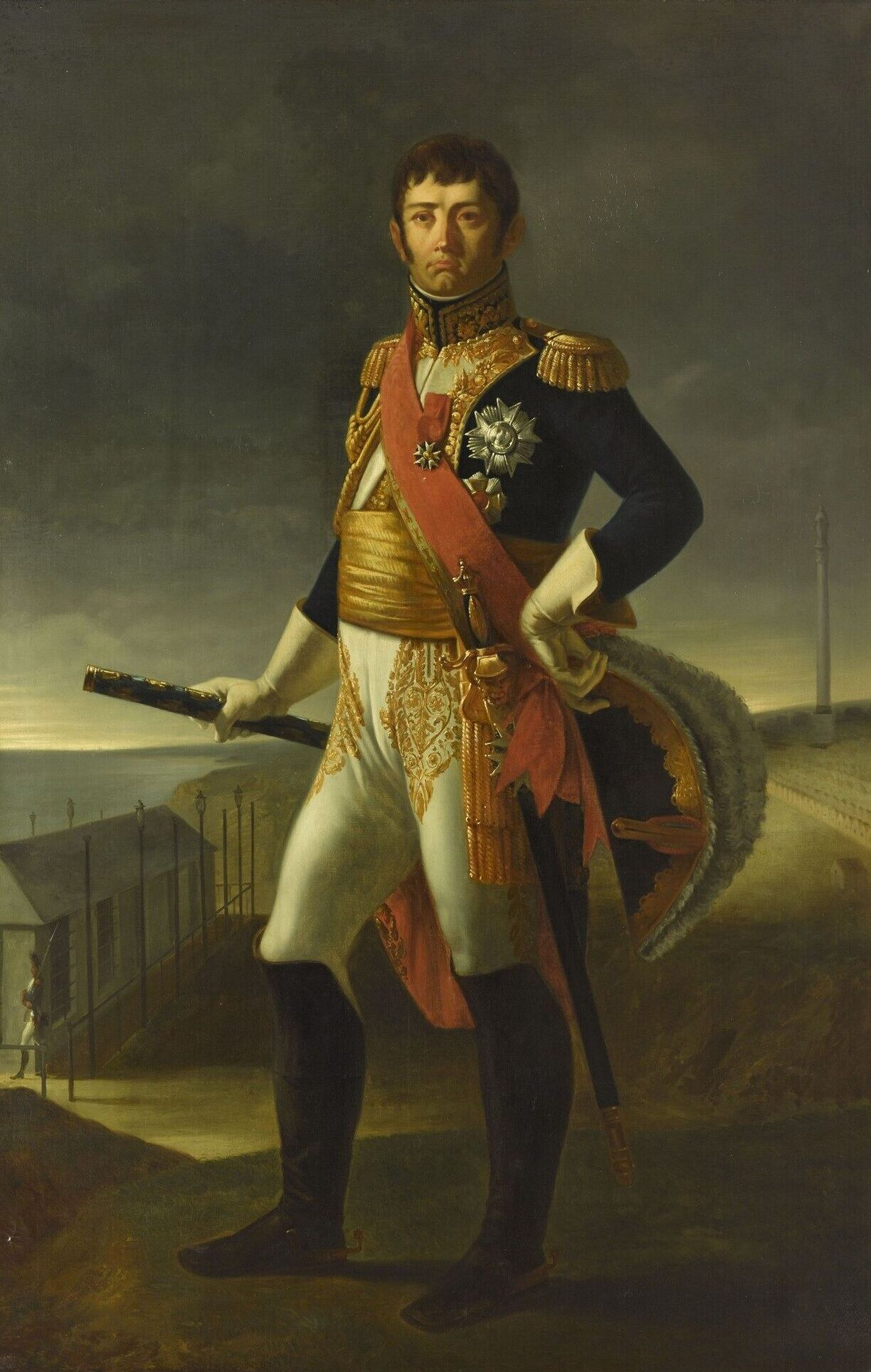
Marshal Jean-de-Dieu Soult

During Marshal Jean-de-Dieu Soult's second invasion of Portugal, Loison was detached to the east to make contact with Pierre Belon Lapisse's command in the west of Spain. He soon encountered 10,000 Portuguese under Francisco Silveira in the Tâmega River valley. Loison attacked, but after the Portuguese fended him off, he demanded reinforcements. Soult soon sent him 9,000 troops from his small army of 21,000. Historian David Gates stated that Loison was "lacking in initiative and unsuited for independent command". Finally on 2 May 1809, covered by a heavy fog, French sappers crept across the bridge at Amarante and cut the fuses on the demolition charges (Battle of the Bridge of Amarante). Loison sent a brigade charging across the span and Silveira's troops were routed. The Portuguese force, which consisted of two battalions of the 12th Line Infantry Regiment and militia, lost 1,600 casualties plus ten guns and five colors. Loison's force included Delaborde's division, three battalions each of the 17th Light, 70th Line, and 86th Line Infantry Regiments, and Jean Thomas Guillaume Lorge's 4th Dragoon Division, four squadrons each of the 13th, 15th, 22nd, and 25th Dragoon Regiments. The French reported only two killed and seven wounded. However, Silveira had stalled Loison's force since 18 April.

After his belated victory, Loison heard about enemy movements to his south and decided to investigate. He bumped into an 11,000-strong Anglo-Portuguese column under William Carr Beresford and retreated back to Amarante, arriving there on 12 May. Taking counsel of his fears, Loison abandoned a very strong position and fell back toward Braga. This represented a major strategic blunder, because on 12 May Wellesley defeated Soult at the Second Battle of Porto, forcing Soult to withdraw toward Amarante. When the French marshal found that he was trapped, he destroyed his vehicles and struck out across the mountains. By great exertions, he joined with Loison's force and managed to get away into Spain, but not before losing 4,000 men, his artillery, and all his equipment.

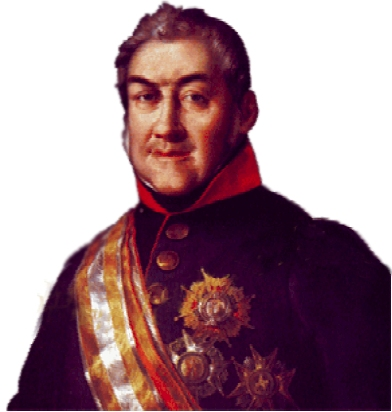
José Santocildes

In January 1810, Loison led the enormous 3rd Division numbering 12,250 men in 19 battalions in Marshal Michel Ney's VI Corps. He was ordered to capture the town of Astorga, but without a siege train, his troops had to blockade the place. Junot finally appeared with the VIII Corps and secured the heavy artillery needed to breach the walls. The siege lasted from 21 March to 22 April, when Colonel José María Santocildes surrendered 2,500 troops. The Spanish garrison suffered 51 killed and 109 wounded while inflicting 160 killed and 400 wounded on the French. Junot's two divisions were led by Bertrand Clausel and Solignac. The surrender occurred one day after the 47th and Irish Line Infantry Regiments of Solignac's division effected a lodgement in the town.

Under Ney's command, Loison participated in the successful Siege of Ciudad Rodrigo from 26 April through 9 July. When the VI Corps advanced into Portugal after its victory, it encountered Robert Craufurd's Light Division near the small Portuguese fortress of Almeida. Unwisely, Craufurd decided to resist the French with the Côa River at his back. Seizing his chance, Ney hurled Loison's division at the British and Portuguese light infantry in the Battle of the Côa on 24 July 1810. The French foot soldiers, with help from the 3rd Hussar Regiment, quickly crumpled Craufurd's left flank. Part of the Light Division stampeded, but the troops quickly rallied and the division barely managed to escape across the lone bridge. Ney then tried to storm the span, but the attack failed with heavy losses. The Allies reported 308 casualties, while French losses numbered 531. The Siege of Almeida lasted from 25 July to 27 August. On the latter day, a lucky hit blew up the main powder magazine, killing 600 Portuguese troops and wounding 300 more. The 4,000 surviving members of the garrison quickly surrendered.

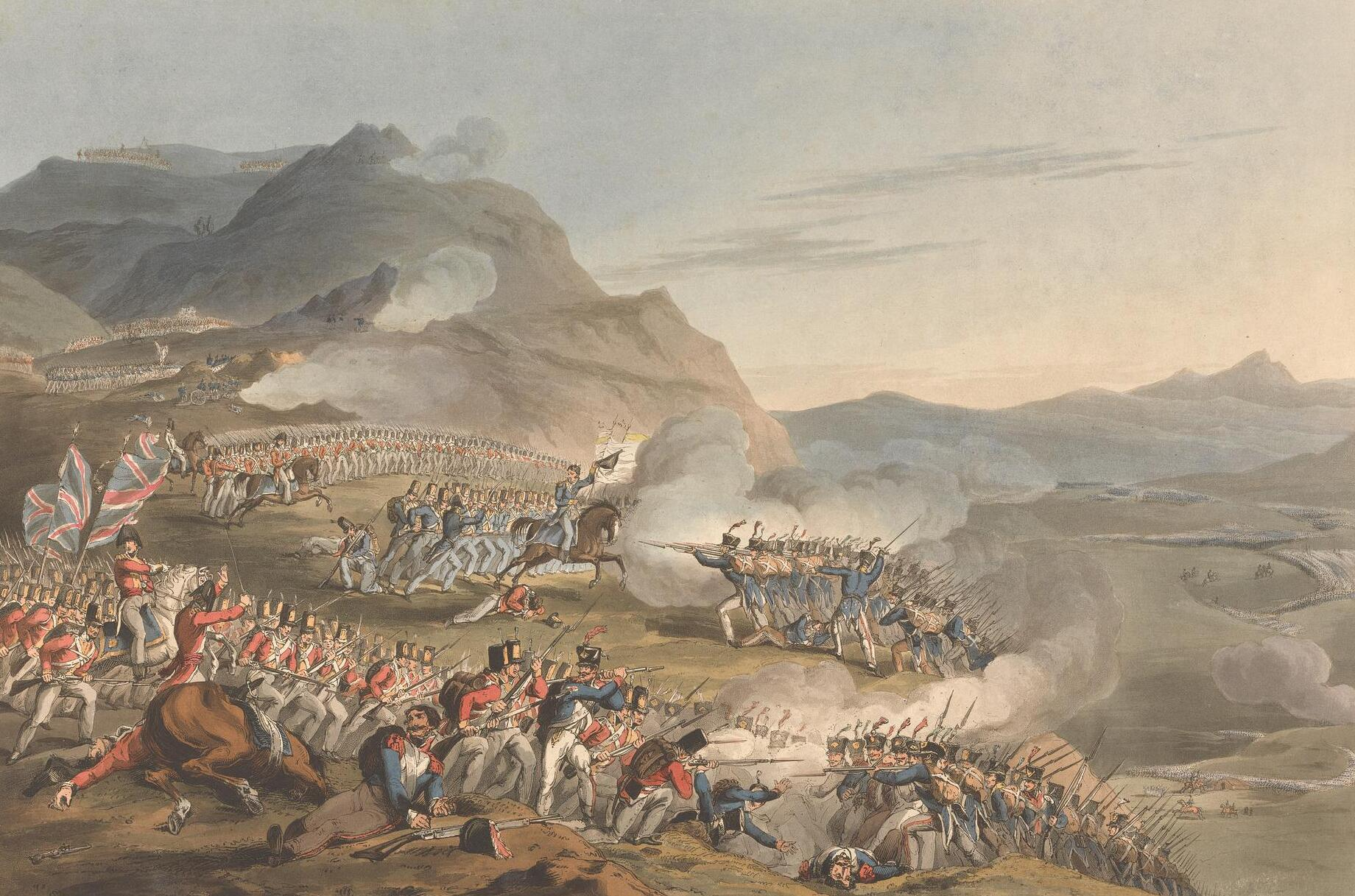
Battle of Bussaco

On 15 September, Loison's 3rd Division counted 239 officers and 6,587 rank and file. The 1st Brigade under Édouard François Simon consisted of the 1st Battalion of the Legion du Midi, the 1st and 2nd Battalions of the Hanoverian Legion, and the 5th, 6th, and 7th Battalions of the 26th Line Infantry Regiment. The 2nd Brigade led by Claude François Ferey included the 2nd Battalion of the 32nd Light Infantry Regiment, the 4th, 5th, and 6th Battalions of the 66th Line Infantry Regiment, and the 4th and 6th Battalions of the 82nd Line Infantry Regiment. During Marshal Masséna's third invasion of Portugal, Loison's division led the unsuccessful VI Corps attack at the Battle of Bussaco. His troops battled their way forward against a heavy Allied skirmish line and the fire of 12 artillery pieces. But when Loison's columns neared the crest of Bussaco Ridge, they were ambushed by the Light Division and chased off the heights with heavy losses. After being held up at the Lines of Torres Vedras all winter the French were compelled to retreat in March 1811 and Ney's corps formed the rear guard.

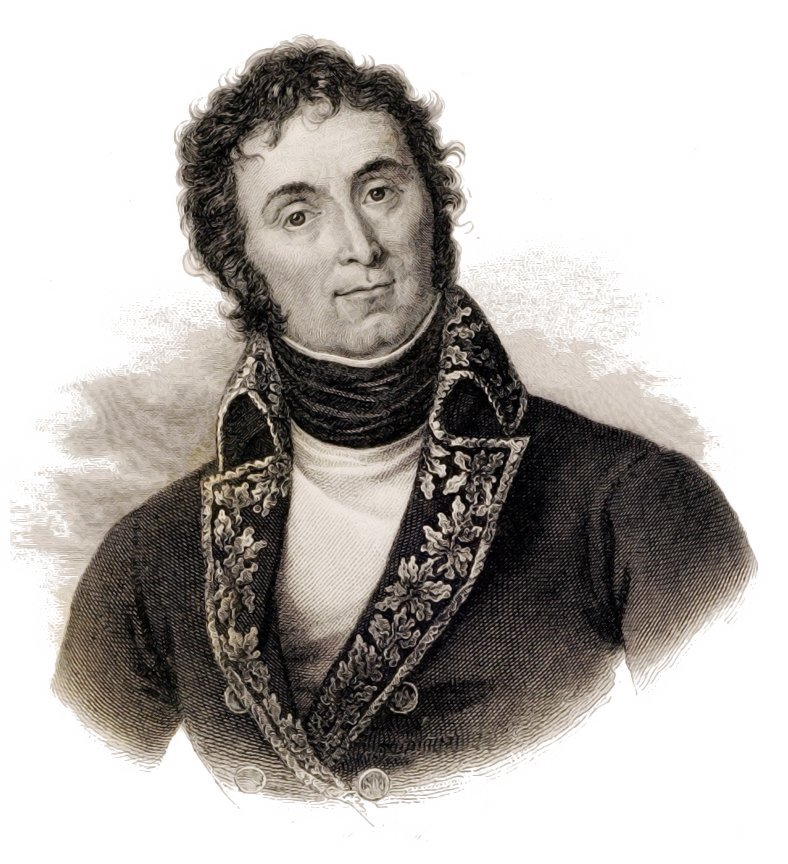
Marshal André Masséna

According to Jean Jacques Pelet, one of Masséna's staff officers, Loison was an intriguer. On at least one occasion Loison expressed his dissatisfaction with Ney, while another time the marshal unfairly blamed Loison for exposing his artillery to capture. On 22 March, when the army had nearly reached a safe position, Ney flatly refused to obey Masséna's orders and was dismissed. Command of the VI Corps passed to Loison, who led the corps at the Battle of Fuentes de Oñoro on 3 to 5 May 1811. During the battle he supervised 17,406 troops in three divisions led by Jean Gabriel Marchand, Julien Augustin Joseph Mermet, and Ferey. On 3 May Ferey battered at the village of Fuentes de Onoro in vain. After a day's pause in the action, Masséna ordered Ferey to attack the village again on the 5th, supported by IX Corps. Meanwhile, Loison's other two divisions, the bulk of the French cavalry, and a third infantry division attempted an envelopment of the Anglo-Portuguese right flank. After some tough fighting, the French attacks were stopped. Soon after the battle Marshal Auguste Marmont replaced Masséna and did away with the corps organization, leaving Junot, Marchand, Mermet, and other generals without employment.

In 1812, Loison was sent with a reserve division of 10,000 newly drafted German and Italian boys to help extricate the remnants of the Grand Army in its retreat from Russia. Either the governor of Vilnius Dirk van Hogendorp or Joachim Murat stupidly ordered him to defend the road to Smarhon'. Camping on the ground when the night-time temperature dropped to minus 35 degrees Celsius proved catastrophic for his untried soldiers. Within a few days, his division of 15.000 soldiers was wiped out of existence without a battle. (Note: According to Mullié, Loison was censured by Napoleon after the 1812 Vilnius incident. Chandler stated that the censure came in 1813 at Wesel.)

Loison was assigned to guard the fortress of Wesel in 1813. But Napoleon arrested him for not marching with his division to the front. After this severe reprimand, his military career was over except for a short-term assignment under Marshal Louis-Nicolas Davout. Unemployed after January 1815, he retired in November of the same year. On 30 December 1816 he died at Chokier near Liège in present-day Belgium. LOISON is inscribed on Column 35 of the Arc de Triomphe.

== Notes ==
Footnotes

Citations
