= Battle of Alcántara (1809) =

1809 battle of the Peninsular War

- Part of the Peninsular War
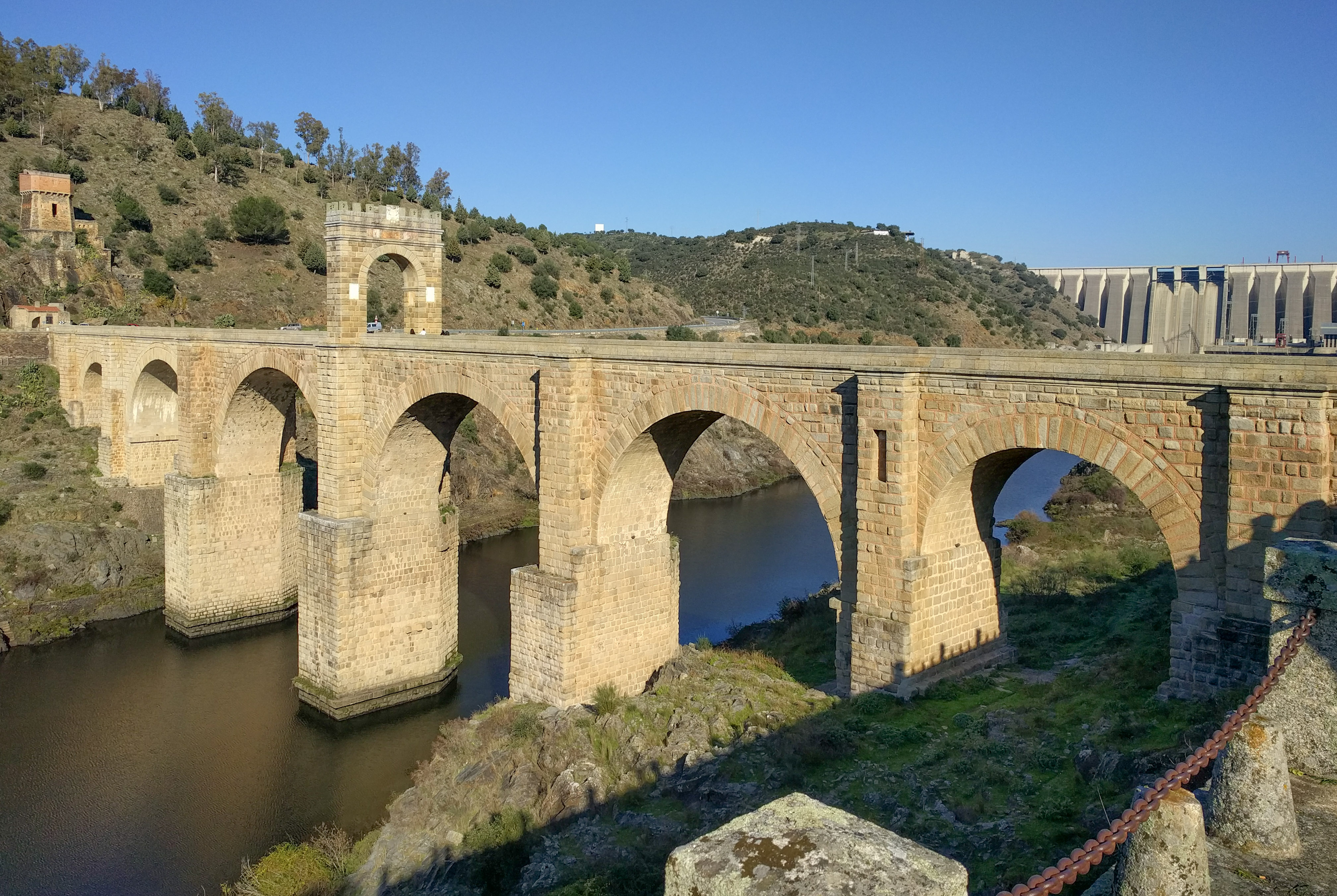
- The Alcántara Bridge, which was fought over during the battle
Date	14 May 1809
Location	Alcántara, Spain 39°43′20″N 06°53′23″W
Result	French victory

Belligerents
France	Portugal; United Kingdom

Commanders and leaders
(First French Empire) Claude Perrin Victor (First French Empire) Pierre Belon Lapisse	(United Kingdom of Great Britain and Ireland) William Mayne

Units involved
(France) I Corps	Loyal Lusitanian Legion; Portuguese militia

Strength
9,500; 12 guns	2,000; 2–6 guns

Casualties and losses
Light	Over 269; 1 gun captured

Peninsular War: Castile & Andalusia
current battle

The Battle of Alcántara was fought on 14 May 1809 during the Peninsular War. It saw a French division led by Marshal Claude Perrin Victor attack an Anglo-Portuguese force comprising the British Army's Loyal Lusitanian Legion (LLL) and Portuguese militia under Colonel William Mayne. After a three hours skirmish, the French stormed across the Alcántara Bridge and forced the Portuguese to retreat. The battle was fought near Alcántara, Spain, a city situated on the Tagus river near the Portuguese border, 285 kilometres (177 mi) west-southwest of Madrid.

While Marshal Nicolas Soult invaded northern Portugal in early 1809, two other French forces stood ready to cooperate in the subjugation of Portugal. Pierre Belon Lapisse's division lurked near Ciudad Rodrigo while Victor's I Corps operated in the Tagus valley. A weak force under Robert Wilson watched Lapisse while Alexander Randoll Mackenzie's Anglo-Portuguese corps kept an eye on Victor. After being outgeneraled by Wilson, Lapisse marched south to join Victor. When Sir Arthur Wellesley's Anglo-Portuguese army advanced to attack Soult's corps, the detachment under Mayne occupied Alcántara.

Believing Mayne's troops to be a serious threat, Victor marched against him. An LLL battalion defended the Alcántara Bridge for three hours. Then, the French artillery silenced their guns and a supporting battalion of militia took to its heels. The bridge was mined, but when Mayne ordered the charges to be detonated, its heavy construction withstood the explosion. Victor's infantry then rushed the incompletely demolished span. The French hung around the area for a few days but finally withdrew. The next action was the Battle of Talavera.

== Background ==
=== Second invasion of Portugal ===
The First invasion of Portugal in 1807 resulted in the French occupation of that nation. This episode came to an end on 21 August 1808 when the invaders were defeated by Sir Arthur Wellesley's British army at the Battle of Vimeiro. Anxious to quickly liberate Portugal, the victorious British generals concluded the Convention of Cintra in which the French occupying army was transported back to France by British ships.

Sir John Moore and his British army departed from Portugal in October 1808, intending to help the Spanish nation throw off Emperor Napoleon's yoke. Moore's expedition ended with his death at the Battle of Corunna on 16 January 1809. Nevertheless, his army won a tactical victory over the pursuing French, allowing the soldiers to be evacuated by the British navy.

Napoleon's strategy for early 1809 called for an invasion of Portugal by three columns. He ordered Marshal Nicolas Soult's 20,000 troops to advance from the north, General of Division Pierre Belon Lapisse's 9,000 men to come in from the northeast, and Marshal Claude Victor's soldiers to march from the east. Napoleon's plan called for Soult to capture Porto (Oporto) by 5 February 1809. From there, Soult was supposed to march to Lisbon and occupy it by the 16th of the same month. Meanwhile, Lapisse was directed to move from Salamanca to seize Ciudad Rodrigo and Almeida, Portugal as soon as Soult's II Corps got to Porto. Victor was ordered to be at Mérida by this time. He was instructed to detach a column from there to advance on Lisbon. The emperor expected that Soult, Lapisse, and Victor would readily be able to send messengers to each other, and easily coordinate their operations. This assumption ignored the likelihood that Portuguese and Spanish guerillas would prevent Soult's dispatches from reaching his colleagues.

Soult marched south on 30 January 1809, aiming for Portugal. After being repelled in his initial attempt to cross the Minho River in mid-February, his forces marched to Ourense and crossed the bridge there. Soult's cavalry crushed a Spanish brigade at La Trepa on 6 March and the II Corps entered Portugal on the 9th. At the Battle of Braga on 20 March, the French routed a Portuguese army consisting of a few regulars and 22,000 militia. The First Battle of Porto on the 29th was another lopsided French victory marked by terrible Portuguese loss of life. But despite being established in Porto, Soult found his communications cut by regular and irregular Portuguese forces under General Francisco Silveira and he had no idea of the whereabouts of Lapisse.

=== Other operations ===
Meanwhile, Marshal Victor won a resounding victory over General Gregorio García de la Cuesta's Spanish army at the Battle of Medellín on 28 March 1809. Though he went on to occupy Mérida, Victor complained in dispatches to King Joseph Bonaparte that he lacked the strength to invade Portugal. He requested the return of Lapisse's division, but was initially refused.

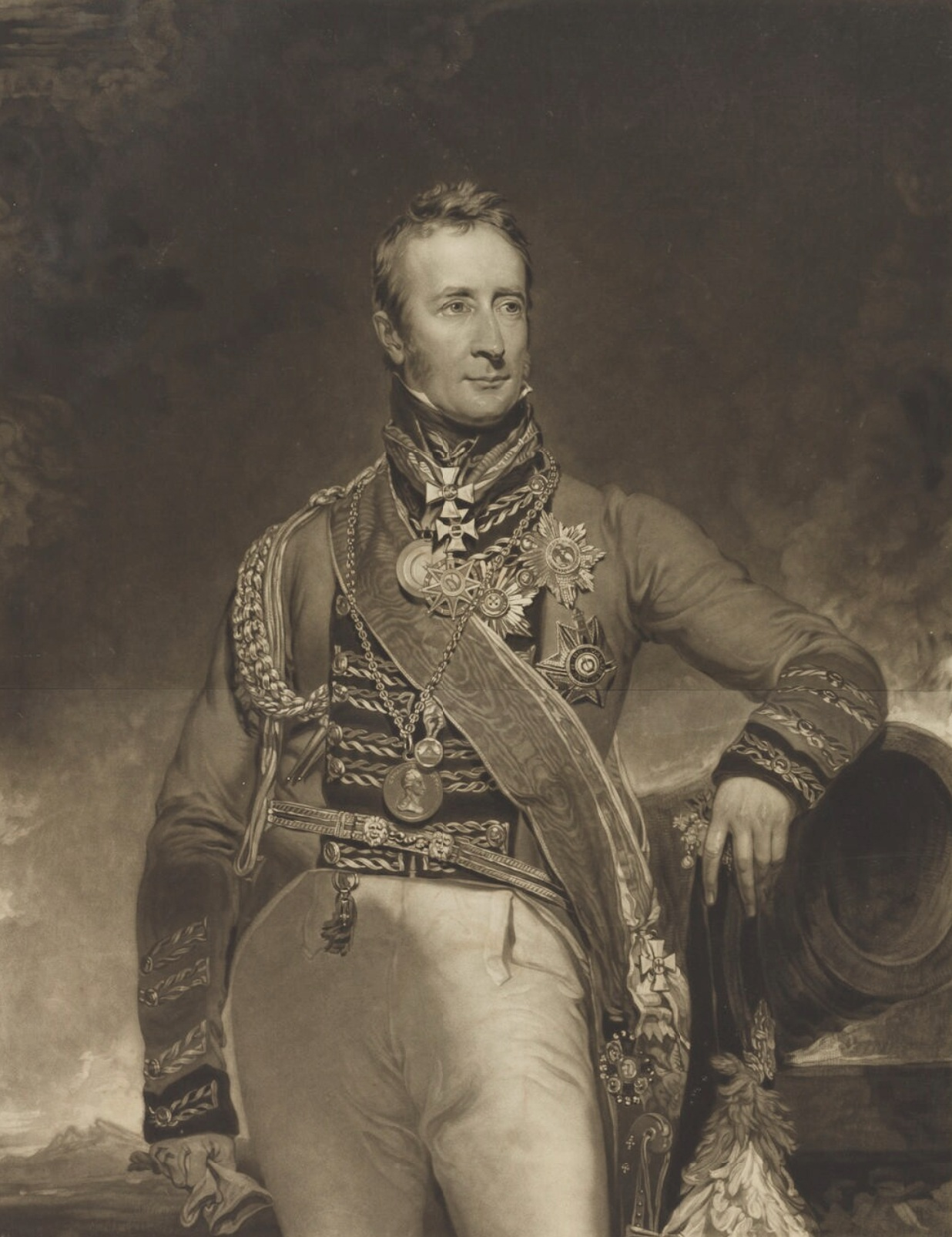
Robert Wilson

Moore's departure with the main British forces left Portugal defended by a scanty garrison under Sir John Cradock. As Cradock prepared to abandon Portugal, a number of his officers were outspoken in their desire to resist the French. Colonel Robert Wilson and 1,200 Portuguese regulars of the Loyal Lusitanian Legion were stationed in the northeast near Almeida. Wilson refused to obey Cradock's order to withdraw. Instead, he garrisoned Almeida with part of his force and, with the remainder, began to vigorously harass Lapisse's oncoming division. Believing that he faced 12,000 enemies, Lapisse's offensive ground to a halt. When Wilson occupied the Puerto de Baños, breaking communications between Lapisse and Victor, it was the last straw. Victor finally secured permission to take control of Lapisse's division. Victor ordered Lapisse to move south and join him. En route, the French soldiers pillaged Alcántara.

On 22 April, Wellesley assumed command of the British army in Portugal, which was quickly reinforced to 23,000 men. Facing widely separated French opponents, Wellesley decided to attack Soult first while observing Victor. The advance northward directly against Soult was allotted 18,500 troops. A 6,000-man flanking column under William Carr Beresford would cooperate with Silveira's force. To observe Victor to the east, Major General Alexander Randoll Mackenzie was given 12,000 soldiers.

Mackenzie watched the Portuguese frontier, based at Abrantes. The British element of this force included Brigadier General Henry Fane's 1,304-saber British cavalry brigade, Mackenzie's 2,709-man British infantry brigade, and Captain May's 315-strong Royal Artillery battery. The 3rd Dragoon Guards and the 4th Dragoons were the mounted units while the 2nd Battalion of the 24th Foot, 3rd Battalion of the 27th Foot, 2nd Battalion of the 31st Foot, and the 1st Battalion of the 41st Foot were the infantry. The Portuguese contingent consisted of a cavalry brigade, an infantry brigade, and two artillery batteries. Five squadrons of the 3rd and 4th Dragoons made up the cavalry brigade. The infantry brigade comprised the 1st and 2nd Battalions of the 3rd, 4th, 13th, and 15th Line Regiments, the 1st Battalion of the 1st Regiment, and the 1st, 4th, and 5th Caçadores Battalions.

== Battle ==
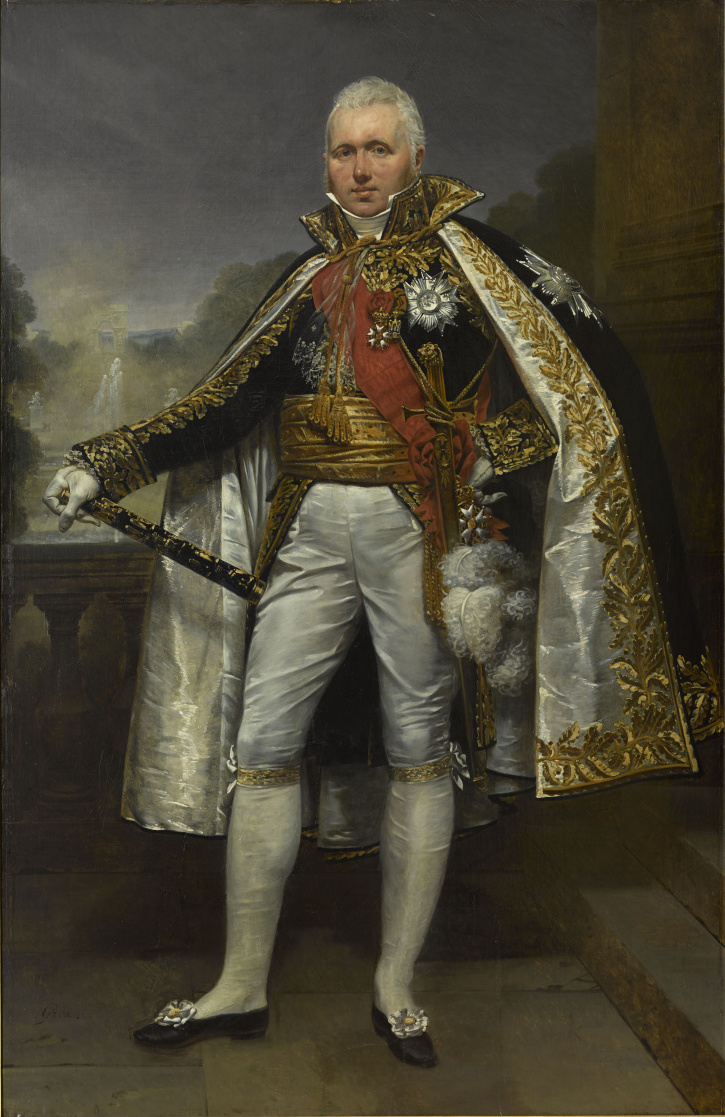
Claude Perrin Victor

Wellington ordered the 1st Battalion of the Loyal Lusitanian Legion under Colonel William Mayne, the Idanha Militia Battalion, and six Legion guns to serve as an outpost to Mackenzie's corps. The approximately 2,000 Portuguese came down from the mountains to the north, crossed into Spain and moved into Alcántara. The old Roman bridge across the Tagus River at Alcántara linked northern and central Extremadura. Believing that Mayne's detachment was the spearhead of an offensive, Victor set out on 11 May to deal with the presumed threat.

The division with Victor was commanded by Lapisse. The 2nd Division of the I Corps consisted of three battalions each of the 16th Light Infantry Regiment and the 8th, 45th, and 54th Line Infantry Regiments. Including eight squadrons in one brigade of dragoons, Victor's force numbered 9,500 men and 12 guns. The horsemen belonged to General of Division Marie Victor de Fay, marquis de Latour-Maubourg's 1st Dragoon Division, which consisted of the 1st, 2nd, 4th, 9th, 14th, and 26th Dragoons. One authority wrote that Mayne's total of 1,850 men included one squadron of Legion cavalry and only two artillery pieces.

On 14 May, Victor's column came into contact with Mayne's outposts at Brozas and rapidly drove them back. Mayne made no attempt to defend the town of Alcántara, which was located on the south bank of the Tagus. Rather, he entrenched his troops on the north bank, mined and barricaded the bridge. Taking in the situation, Victor decided to soften up his opponent's defenses before sending in his infantry. The French artillery and infantry began firing across the river at Mayne's Portuguese. The defenders resisted stoutly for three hours. Around noon, the Portuguese militia panicked and ran away. Mayne then ordered the charges on the bridge to be detonated.

After the smoke from the explosion cleared away it was discovered that the tough old bridge was still intact. One side of the arch was gone, but the span was still standing. By this time, the French artillery had succeeded in dismounting one of Mayne's cannons and silencing the rest. Victor ordered one of Lapisse's brigades to rush the bridge. When the French soldiers managed to brave the defensive fire and gain a foothold on the north bank, Mayne ordered a retreat to the Salvaterra Pass.

== Result ==
The 1,000-man battalion of the Loyal Lusitanian Legion sustained losses of three officers and 103 men killed, five officers and 143 men wounded, and 15 men missing. Militia losses were not stated. The dismounted gun was abandoned. French losses are unknown. Victor saw for himself that Mayne's small force was not the threat he had supposed. The French pressed only a few miles beyond Alcántara, but this alarmed Mackenzie who believed he was about to be attacked. Wellesley reassured his subordinate that he had nothing to worry about, that Victor could not spare enough soldiers to present a real threat to his position behind the Zêzere River. After spending three days near Alcántara, Victor withdrew to Torremocha. While Victor was away, Cuesta sent a force against Mérida. The raid failed to dislodge two battalions of Jean Francois Leval's German division from a fortified convent.
