= Portuguese Legion =

Portuguese Legion may refer to:

- Portuguese Legion (Napoleonic Wars), 1808–1814, military unit serving in concert with the forces of Napoleon
- Portuguese Legion (Estado Novo), paramilitary state existing from 1936–1974
- Loyal Lusitanian Legion, 1808, a unit of the British Army, composed of Portuguese volunteers.
