= Battle of the Bridge of Amarante =

1809 battle during the Peninsular War

- Part of the Peninsular War
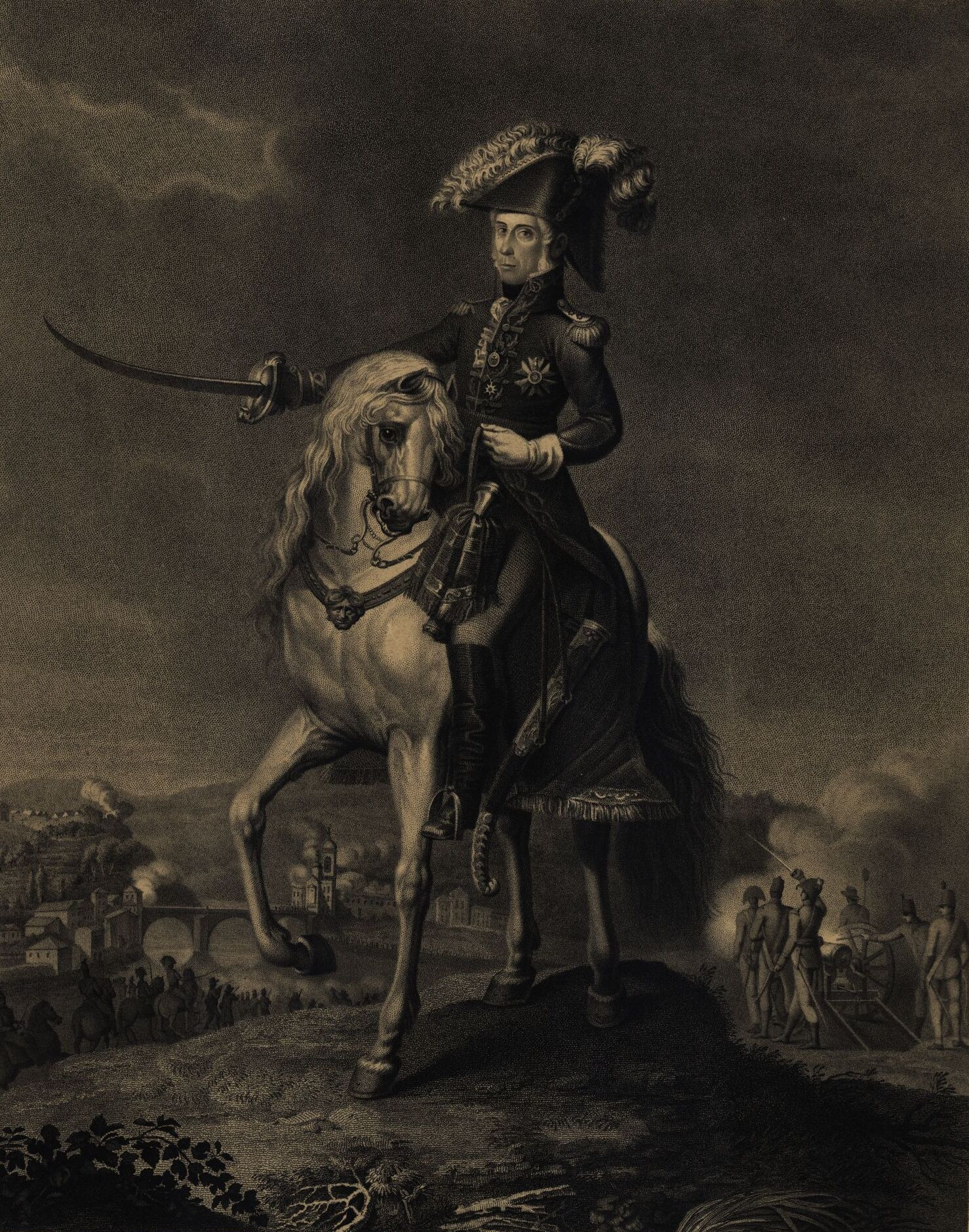
- An engraved portrait of Marshal Silveira with the battle in the background, by Raimundo Joaquim da Costa after a drawing by João Baptista Ribeiro
Date	18 April 1809 – 2 May 1809
Location	Amarante, Porto, Portugal 41°16′08″N 8°04′41″W
Result	French victory

Belligerents
Portugal	(France) French Empire

Commanders and leaders
Francisco Silveira	Louis Henri Loison

Strength
2,000 regulars, plus 7,000–8,000 half-armed militia and Ordenanças	9,000 men

Casualties and losses
300 captured 10 guns captured	Unknown

The Battle of the Bridge of Amarante (Note: Oman (1903, p. 250.) refers to it as the defence of Amarante.) (18 April 1809 – 2 May 1809) was fought during the Peninsular War between Portuguese regular troops and militia regiments under the command of Francisco da Silveira, on the one hand, and a force of French troops under Loison.

During the second French invasion of Portugal, and following Silveira's victory at Chaves in March, Marshal Soult, based at Porto, sent General Loison to the east to make contact with Pierre Belon Lapisse's command in the west of Spain.

However, Loison's path was blocked by a mixed force of some 10,000 regular and irregular Portuguese troops under Silveira at Amarante, on the banks of the Tâmega. Unable to proceed, Loison requested reinforcements and Soult then sent Generals Delaborde, Lorge, Heudelet, Sarrut and Lahoussaye to assist Loison in opening up the route back to Spain. By blockading the bridge at Amarante, (Note: There had been two other bridges above Amarante (at Mondim and Aroza), and one below it (at Canavezes), but all three been blown up, and Portuguese troops were watching over them to prevent any attempt to reconstruct them. (1903, p. 269.)) the Portuguese troops were able hold Loison, now with 9,000 French troops, nearly half of Soult's Army of Portugal, concentrated on the west bank of the river for almost two weeks, thereby giving the British troops the opportunity to march on Coimbra and Oporto.

Having discovered that the Portuguese had mined the bridge, Loison was faced with the dilemma of how to prevent the Portuguese from blowing it up if forced to retreat. Finally, a French captain of Engineers, Pierre-François Bouchard, suggested that an explosion at the French side of the bridge would likely sever the cord without causing the mine to go off, thereby giving the French troops the element of surprise and the opportunity to make a sudden assault on the Portuguese.

Once they had stormed the bridge, the French troops captured the ten guns in the Portuguese batteries, five standards, and took several hundred prisoners.

== See also ==
- Timeline of the Peninsular War
