= Charles Calvert (MP) =

English brewer and Member of Parliament

Charles Calvert (30 August 1768 – 8 September 1832) was a wealthy English brewer and Member of Parliament in the early 19th century.

Calvert was the third son of Southwark brewer Felix Calvert, and was educated at Tonbridge and Harrow Schools. In 1802, he inherited a half-share in his father's brewery, Calvert & Co.

A Whig, he stood for Parliament and was elected as MP for Southwark from 1812 to 1830 and then from 1830 until his death in 1832.

In Parliament, he allied himself with brewers' interests, often opposing taxes on tobacco, beer and tea for their impacts on the working classes and on manufacturers. He opposed the blockade of Norway in 1814 and the resumption of hostilities with Napoleon, and supported parliamentary reform.

He married Jane, youngest daughter of Sir William Rowley of Tendring Hall, Suffolk, in 1823, and lived at Ockley Court in Surrey and Kneller Hall in Twickenham, west London, up to his death from cholera in September 1832.

Parliament of the United Kingdom
Preceded by Sir Thomas Turton; Henry Thornton	Member of Parliament for Southwark; 1812–1830; With: Henry Thornton to 1815; Charles Barclay 1815–1818; Sir Robert Wilson from 1818	Succeeded by John Rawlinson Harris; Sir Robert Wilson
Preceded by John Rawlinson Harris; Sir Robert Wilson	Member of Parliament for Southwark; 1830–1832; With: Sir Robert Wilson to 1831; William Brougham from 1831	Succeeded by John Humphery; William Brougham
