= Combat of Padrões de Teixeira =

1808 battle during the Peninsular War

- Part of the Peninsular War
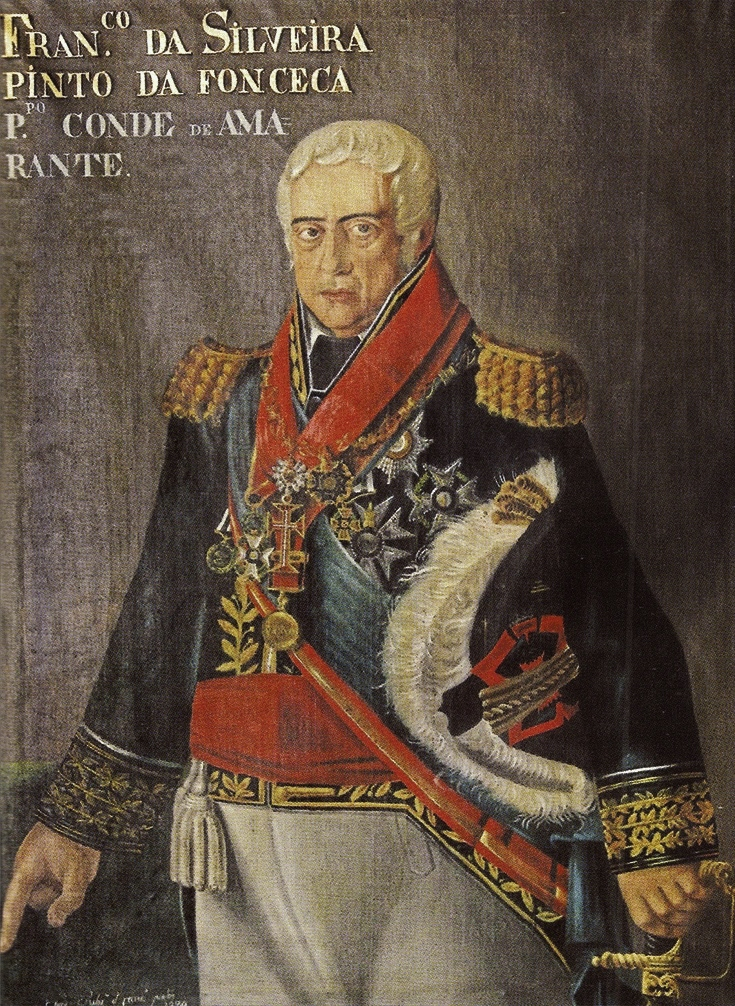
- 19th-century portrait of 1st Count of Amarante, Portuguese general
Date	End of June 1808
Location	Teixeira, Baião, Portugal
Result	Portuguese victory

Belligerents
Portugal	(France) French Empire

Commanders and leaders
(Portugal) Francisco da Silveira	(France) Louis Henri Loison

Strength
Numerous peasants	1,800 soldiers

Casualties and losses
-	Considerable losses

Peninsular War: French occupation

The Combat of Padrões de Teixeira took place at the end of June 1808, during the First French invasion of Portugal. The revolt against the French forces started in June 1808. Junot ordered General Loison to march on to Porto, with 1,800 soldiers from Almeida.

== Combat ==
On the 21 June, Loison crossed the Douro river. In the mountainous regions of northern Portugal, Francisco da Silveira assembled a force of numerous peasants ready to fight the French force. The combat inflicted considerable losses to the French force, Portuguese losses are unknown.

== Aftermath ==
After the combat, Loison decided to retreat to Almeida. He met resistance again at Castro Daire, between Lamego and Viseu, which ended with 400 dead and wounded on both sides. The next combat was the Battle of Évora (1808).
