= Battle of Puerto de Baños =

1809 battle of the Peninsular War

- Part of Peninsular War
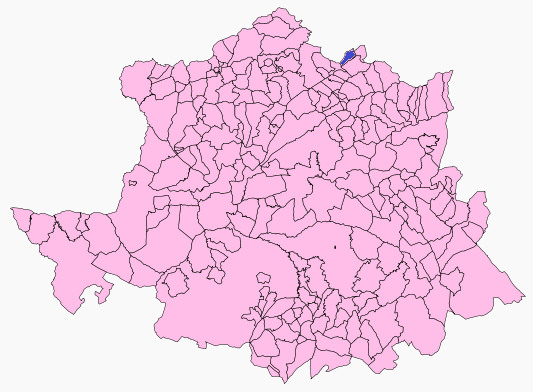
- Baños de Montemayor
| Date | 12 August 1809 |
| Location | Baños de Montemayor, Spain 40°19′6″N 5°51′26″W |
| Result | French victory |

Belligerents
| (France) French Empire | Portugal; Spain |

Commanders and leaders
| (France) Michel Ney (France) Maurice Mathieu | Robert Wilson |

Strength
| 12,500 | 3,500 |

Casualties and losses
| 185 | 400 |

Peninsular War: Castile & Andalusia 1809–1810

The Battle of Puerto de Baños (12 August 1809) saw a Portuguese-Spanish column led by Robert Wilson attempt to defend a mountain pass against Marshal Michel Ney's VI Corps. After a nine-hour combat, Wilson's force broke up and scattered into the mountains. Baños de Montemayor is located about 45 kilometres (28 mi) northeast of Plasencia, Spain. The clash occurred during the Peninsular War, part of a larger struggle known as the Napoleonic Wars.

== Background ==
In the summer of 1809, the British army of Arthur Wellesley, 1st Duke of Wellington marched into western Spain to join Gregorio García de la Cuesta's Spanish army. Wilson's 3,500-man Portuguese-Spanish force served as the left flank guard of this offensive. The Allied armies defeated King Joseph Bonaparte's Imperial French army at Talavera at the end of July. However, the threat of Marshal Nicolas Soult's large army to the north soon forced Wellesley and Cuesta to withdraw to the west.

== Battle ==
Having advanced to Escalona, Wilson found himself isolated by the sudden concentration of French forces. The Portuguese-Spanish force successfully dodged some French intercepting columns by taking to the mountains. At Puerto de Baños, Wilson found Ney's corps marching north to cross the pass and decided to fight. After a skillful defense, Wilson's troops were finally defeated, but they escaped into Portugal without further incident.
