= Loyal Lusitanian Legion =

- Leal Legião Lusitana
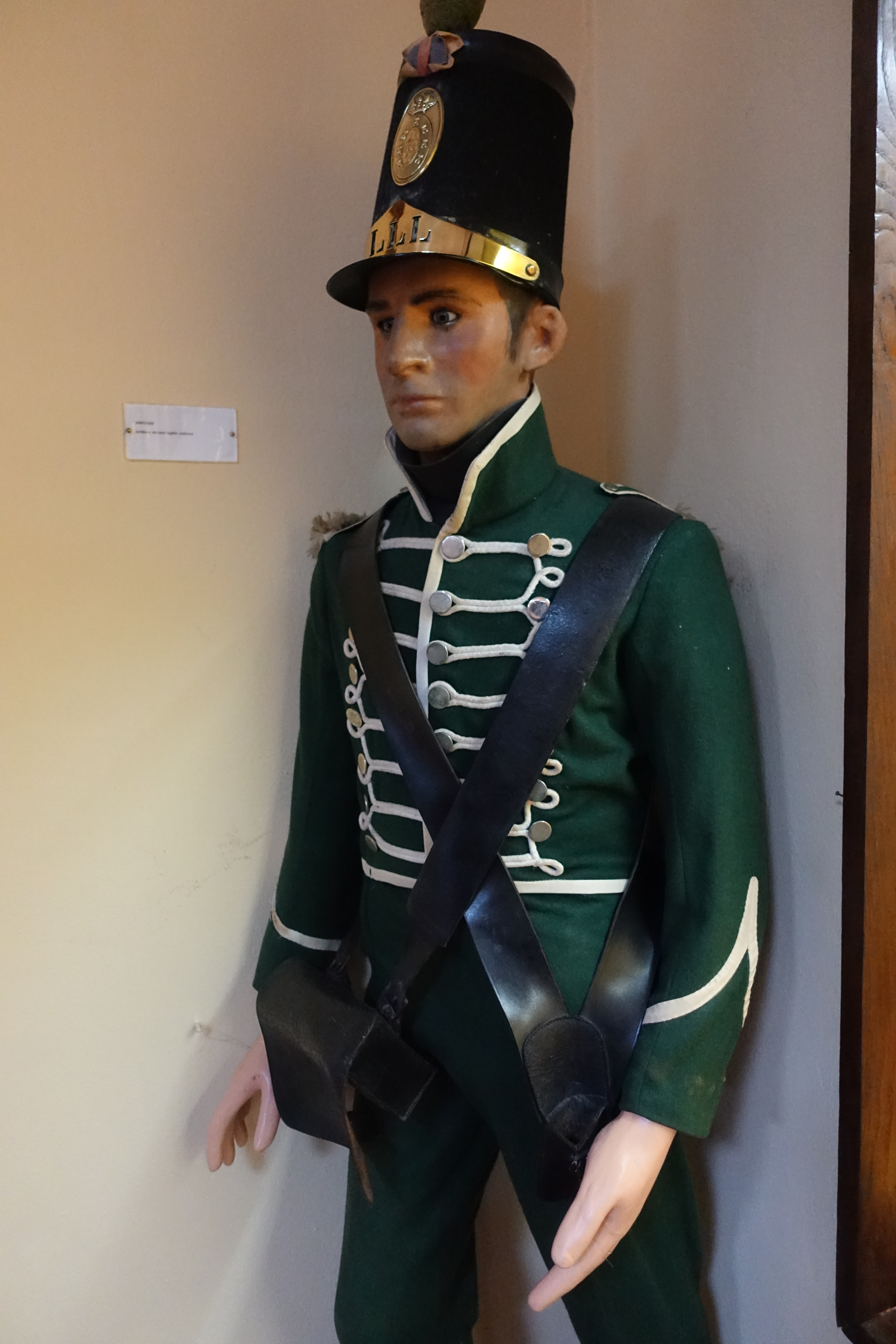
- Mannequin of a regimental soldier
- Active: July 1808 – 4 May 1811
- Country: Portugal
- Branch: Portuguese Army
- Type: Regiment
- Role: Light infantry and field artillery
- Size: 3,080+
- Engagements: Peninsular War; Battle of Alcántara (1809); Battle of Talavera; Battle of Bussaco

Commanders
- Colonel of the Regiment: Robert Wilson

The Loyal Lusitanian Legion (Portuguese: Leal Legião Lusitana) was a light infantry and field artillery regiment of the Portuguese Army. The regiment was raised on the initiative of José Maria de Moura and Carlos Frederico Lecor, two Portuguese army colonels who had gone into exile in England after the Franco-Spanish occupation of Portugal in 1807, along with Portugal's ambassador to Britain Domingos António de Sousa. The trio's idea met with a positive reception from the British government, which agreed to pay for the regiment. The regiment was named "Loyal" to distinguish it from the Portuguese Legion, a French Imperial Army formation consisting of former Portuguese Army troops.

In July 1808 the core of the regiment was raised at Plymouth from Portuguese émigrés in England and subsequently embarked for Portugal, landing at Porto in August where they recruited more men. Though the regiment's other ranks were Portuguese, its officers were mostly British or German, including the regimental colonel Robert Wilson. During the Peninsular War the regiment as part of the Anglo-Portuguese Army fought at the battles of Alcántara, Talavera and Bussaco along with carrying out irregular operations behind French lines or supporting Portuguese and Spanish militias. The regiment was disbanded in 4 May 1811, with its light infantry battalions becoming the 7th, 8th and 9th Caçadores Battalions.

== Organisation and uniform ==
The regiment was organised as a light infantry unit with an attached artillery battery. It comprised the following sub-units:

1. Regimental staff;
2. 1st Battalion;
3. 2nd Battalion;
4. 3rd Battalion;
5. Artillery corps.

Each battalion comprised 1,000 men divided into 10 companies, while the artillery corps consisted of an 80-man battery comprising six field guns; a cavalry arm was initially planned to be raised but such plans were ultimately dropped. When the regiment was disbanded the first regimental battalion became the 7th Caçadores Battalion, the second became the 8th Caçadores Battalion and the third became the core of the 9th Caçadores Battalion. The regiment was initially intended to wear red coats but as this proved unpopular among the regiment's Portuguese members they were instead issued dark green coats similar to those of the British Army's rifle regiments; green was also the royal livery of the House of Braganza. The regiment's troops wore black shakos and white facings on their uniforms.
