= Torremocha, Cáceres =

Torremocha
- municipality
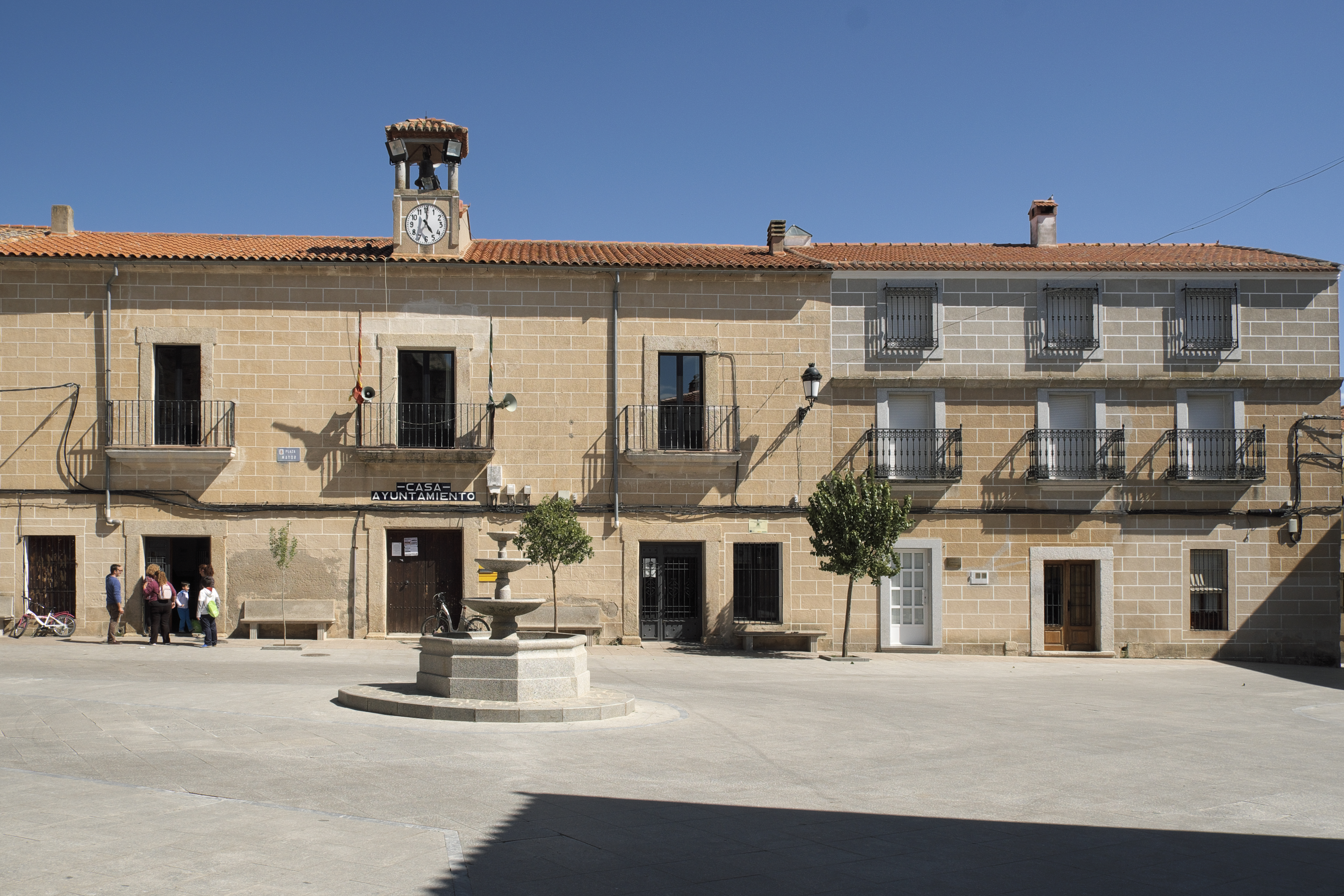

- Coat of arms

- Location in Extremadura Location in Spain
- Coordinates: 39°21′N 6°10′W
- Country: Spain
- Autonomous community: Extremadura
- Province: Cáceres

Area
  - Total: 63.83 km^{2} (24.64 sq mi)

Population (2025-01-01)
  - Total: 742
  - Density: 11.6/km^{2} (30.1/sq mi)
- Time zone: UTC+1 (CET)
  - Summer (DST): UTC+2 (CEST)
- Website: torremocha.es

Torremocha is a municipality located in the province of Cáceres, in the autonomous community of Extremadura, Spain. The municipality covers an area of 63.83 square kilometres (24.64 sq mi) and as of 2011 had a population of 992 people.

== See also ==
- List of municipalities in Cáceres
