= Calvert & Co =

English porter brewery

Calvert & Co was an English porter brewery in the eighteenth century. Calvert brewed at the City of London brewery. Between 1784 and 1791 it was the second largest brewery in the world in terms of production volume.

== History ==
The Hour Glass Brewery was founded at 89 Thames Street by 1431. The Calvert family acquired it in 1730. In 1805 a fire destroyed the premises. In 1860 the City of London Brewing Company was formed to acquire Calverts.
