= Robert Wilson (British Army officer, born 1777) =

British Army officer and politician (1777–1849)

General Sir Robert Wilson
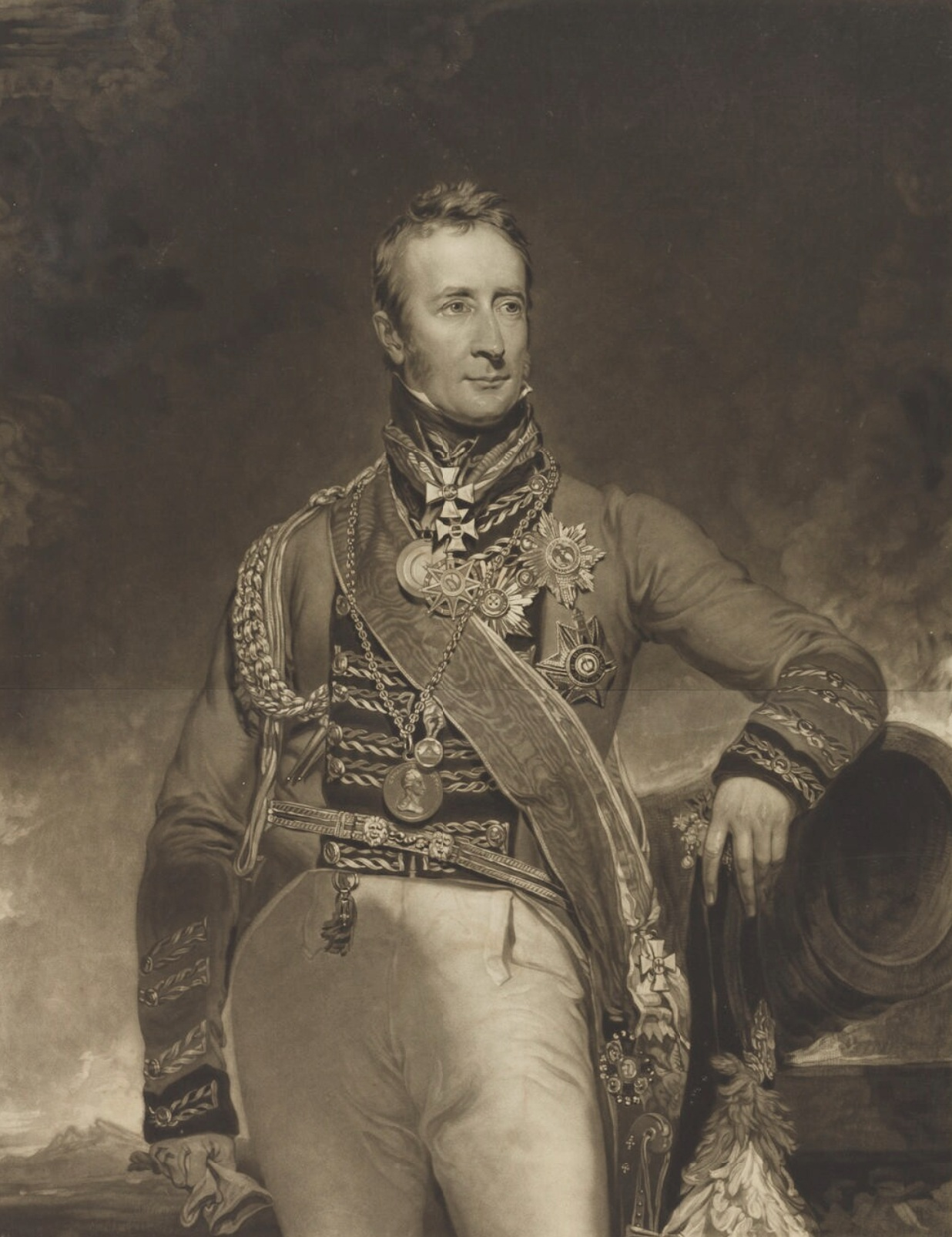
- Engraving by William Ward after a Henry William Pickersgill portrait, 1819
- Born: 17 August 1777; London, England
- Died: 9 May 1849 (aged 71)
- Military career
- Allegiance: Great Britain; United Kingdom; Portugal
- Branch: British Army; Portuguese Army
- Service years: 1794–1821; 1830–1849
- Rank: General (British Army); Brigadier general (Portuguese Army)
- Units: 15th Light Dragoons; 19th Light Dragoons; 20th Light Dragoons
- Commands: Loyal Lusitanian Legion
- Conflicts: French Revolutionary Wars; Flanders campaign; Battle of Le Cateau (1794); Battle of Villers-en-Cauchies; Battle of Boxtel; Irish Rebellion of 1798; Anglo-Russian invasion of Holland; Battle of Alkmaar (1799); French invasion of Egypt and Syria; Battle of Abukir (1801); Siege of Alexandria (1801); Napoleonic Wars; Battle of Blaauwberg; Battle of Eylau; Battle of Friedland; Peninsular War; Retreat to Corunna; Battle of Puerto de Baños; French invasion of Russia; Battle of Smolensk (1812); German campaign of 1813; Battle of Lützen (1813); Battle of Bautzen (1813); Battle of Leipzig; Italian campaign of 1813–1814
- Awards: Knight Bachelor

General Sir Robert Thomas Wilson (17 August 1777 – 9 May 1849) was a British army officer and Whig politician who served in French Revolutionary and Napoleonic Wars. He also represented Southwark in the House of Commons of the United Kingdom from 1818 to 1831 and served as the governor of Gibraltar from 1842 until his death in 1849.

== Early career ==
Born in London, he was the grandson of a Leeds wool merchant, and the fourth child of painter and portraitist Benjamin Wilson. Orphaned at the age of twelve he was raised and educated by his uncle and guardian, William Bosville, later attending Westminster School.

He eloped in his twenties with Jemima, the daughter of Colonel William Belford. They had thirteen children in the following 15 years.

== Military life ==
He had a distinguished career in the army and the diplomatic service. In 1794, as an ensign in the 15th Light Dragoons, Wilson fought in the celebrated Battle of Villers-en-Cauchies where a handful of cavalry smashed a much larger French force. He was made a Knight Bachelor in 1801. That year also saw him serving in Egypt under General Abercromby and later General Hely-Hutchinson as the French were driven out of Cairo and Alexandria. In 1804 he became a lieutenant-colonel in the 19th Light Dragoons. In 1805 as Lieutenant-Colonel of 200 from the 20th Light Dragoons he joined the forces for the invasion of the Cape of Good Hope, in January 1806. In 1806 he joined a diplomatic mission to Prussia led by Hutchinson, with whom he had served in Egypt. Wilson was present at the battle of Eylau and Friedland. He was briefly at Tilsit at the signing of the Treaty of Tilsit and claimed to have crossed to the French side of the river while disguised as a Cossack in the company of a friend who was also a Cossack general. After the treaty was signed he travelled to St Petersburg and unaware of the secret clauses, campaigned vigorously for continued friendship between Britain and Russia. When the British ambassador discovered that Russia was about to declare war, Wilson was despatched to Britain with the news. It was hoped that he could overhaul a Russian courier who had been sent ahead of him, which he did in Stockholm. Having left St Peterburg on the eighth of November, he arrived in Scarborough Yorkshire, England on the thirtieth. By four AM on the second of December he was waking up the British Foreign Secretary, George Canning, with the news. The early warning enabled Britain to detain a Russian warship then in its waters and unaware of the impending war declaration.

During the Peninsular War Wilson was appointed colonel of the Portuguese Army's Loyal Lusitanian Legion when it was raised in July 1808; he was also commissioned into the Portuguese army at the rank of brigadier general. During the British retreat from the Iberian peninsula in January 1809, Wilson refused to comply with the withdrawal and instead decided to oppose the incoming 9,000-man corps commanded by the French General Pierre Belon Lapisse. He installed half of his 1,200 Lusitanian Legion in the fortress of Almeida and arranged the rest in a thin screen. He then harried the opposition with such remorseless energy that Lapisse, convinced he was confronted by a far more numerous enemy, switched entirely to the defensive. In summer 1809, Wilson's Legion again formed an important part of the Anglo-Portuguese network of advance posts and was placed on the Spanish frontier to provide early warning of French moves while the British commander Wellington advanced on Oporto. In Wellington's advance on Talavera in spring 1809, Wilson's Lusitanians again formed a valuable flank guard. Although heavily outnumbered, they managed to stop Marshal Victor's advance into Portugal by partially blowing up the bridge at Alcantara. In the aftermath of the Battle of Talavera, when the French General Victor and his corps threatened to cut Wellington's forces off from the south, Wilson's small flank column of 1,500 men surprised Victor's 19,600 men from the north. In the face of this unclear threat, Victor panicked and precipitously withdrew to Madrid. On 12 August 1809, Wilson with 4,000 men, including two battalions of the Legion, was defeated by French forces under Marshal Michel Ney at the Battle of Puerto de Baños. Facing treble the number of French, Wilson nevertheless managed to maintain his position for nine hours. He lost nearly 400 men while inflicting 185 casualties on the French.

Wilson returned to Russia in 1812 as a liaison officer to the Imperial Russian Army, joining and describing in detail Kutuzov's campaign against Napoleon, showing that he was a sharp observer during the events of Napoleon's disastrous retreat from Moscow. In addition he assisted in the November 1815 escape of the Bonapartist Lavalette from Paris.

== Parliament ==
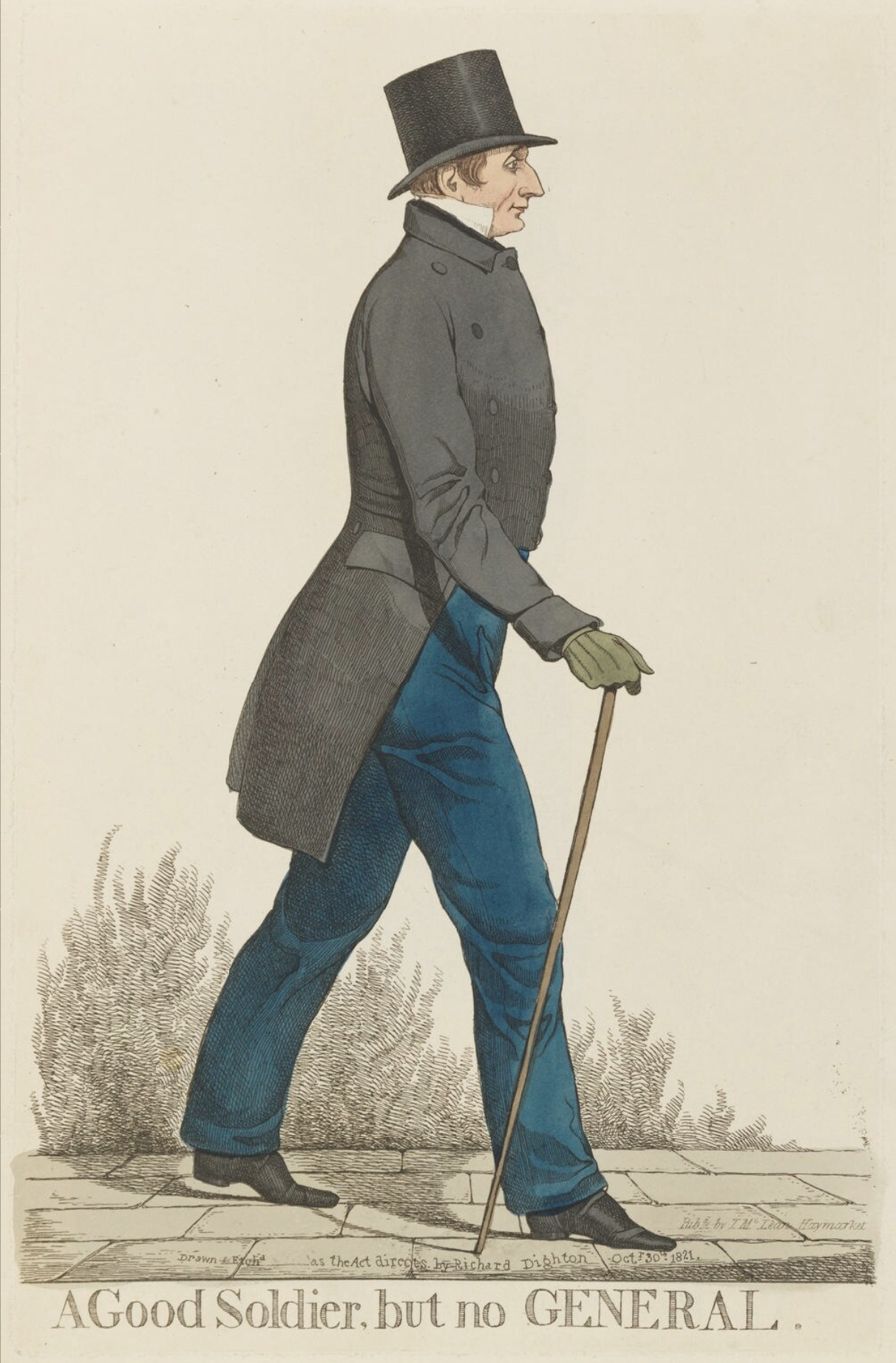
1821 illustration of Wilson by Richard Dighton

In 1817, near the start of the Great Game, he published the anti-Russian "A Sketch of the Military and Political Power of Russia".

In 1818, Wilson became an MP for Southwark. In 1821 and by now a Radical, he attended the funeral of Queen Caroline whose treatment by her husband George IV had made her popular. Her supporters became unruly, and soldiers fired over the heads of the crowd. Wilson intervened, stating that "It is quite disgraceful to continue firing in this manner, for the people are unarmed. Remember you are soldiers of Waterloo; do not lose your honours gained on that occasion. You have had cannon shot at your head, never mind a few stones." The firing ceased as the officer in charge recognised Wilson, and the troops backed off. A few weeks later Wilson was dismissed from the Army by the Duke of York.

== Later career ==
Wilson was reinstated in the Army and promoted to lieutenant-general in 1830. He reached the rank of full general in 1841 and was appointed Governor of Gibraltar in 1842. He wrote a great deal about history and politics.

== Death ==
Wilson died suddenly on 9 May 1849 at Marshall Thompson's Hotel in Cavendish Square, London. He is buried along with his wife in the north aisle at Westminster Abbey.

Parliament of the United Kingdom
Preceded by Charles Calvert; Charles Barclay	Member of Parliament for Southwark; 1818–1831; With: Charles Calvert to 1830; John Rawlinson Harris 1830; Charles Calvert from 1830	Succeeded by Charles Calvert; William Brougham
Government offices
Preceded by Sir Alexander Woodford	Governor of Gibraltar; 1842–1848	Succeeded by Sir Robert Gardiner
