= Chokier =

Section of Flémalle, Belgium

Coordinates: 50°35′25″N 5°26′32″E

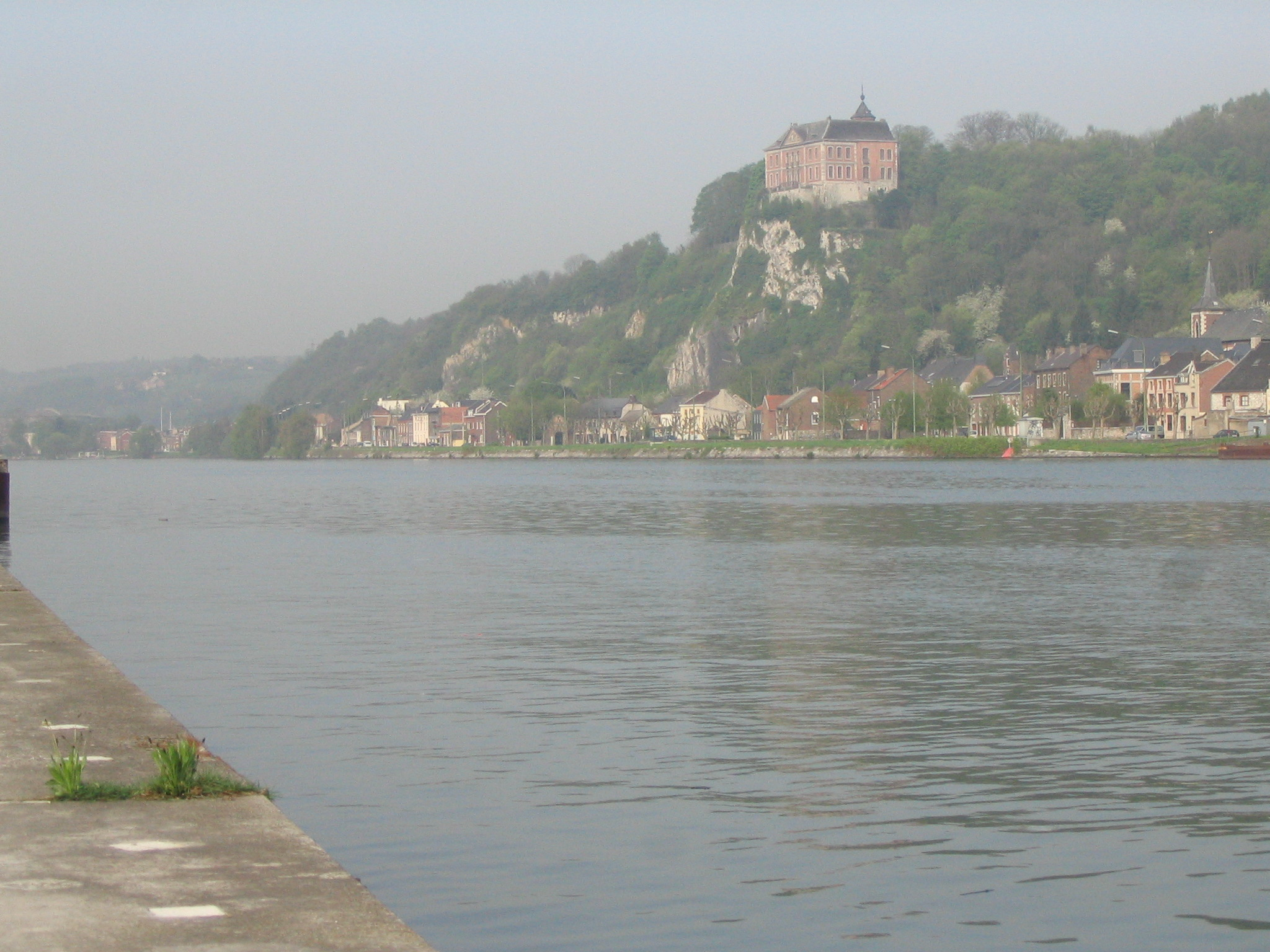
Chokier and its dominating château seen from the Meuse

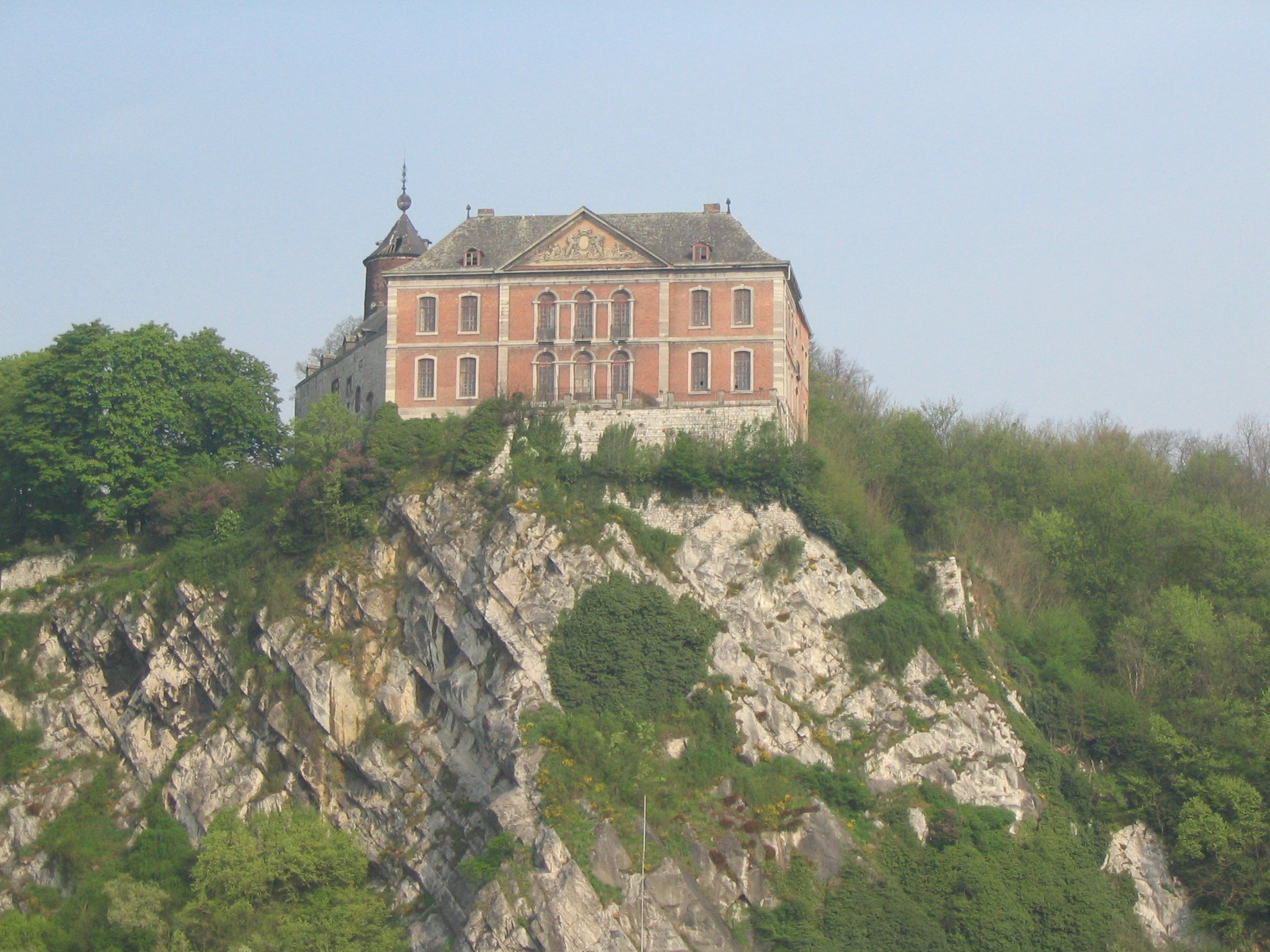
Château de Chokier

Chokier (Walloon: Tchôkire) is a village of Wallonia in the municipality of Flémalle, district of Flémalle-Haute, in the province of Liège, Belgium. It is located on the left bank of the river Meuse.

The village is dominated by the Château de Chokier, an 18th-century rebuild of a medieval castle, standing on a cliff overlooking the Meuse valley.

For centuries the castle was owned by the Surlet de Chokier family, which included the Baron Surlet de Chokier who was Regent of Belgium in 1831 before the Belgian Revolution.

There are traces of human habitation from the Palaeolithic period.
