= Pierre Belon Lapisse =

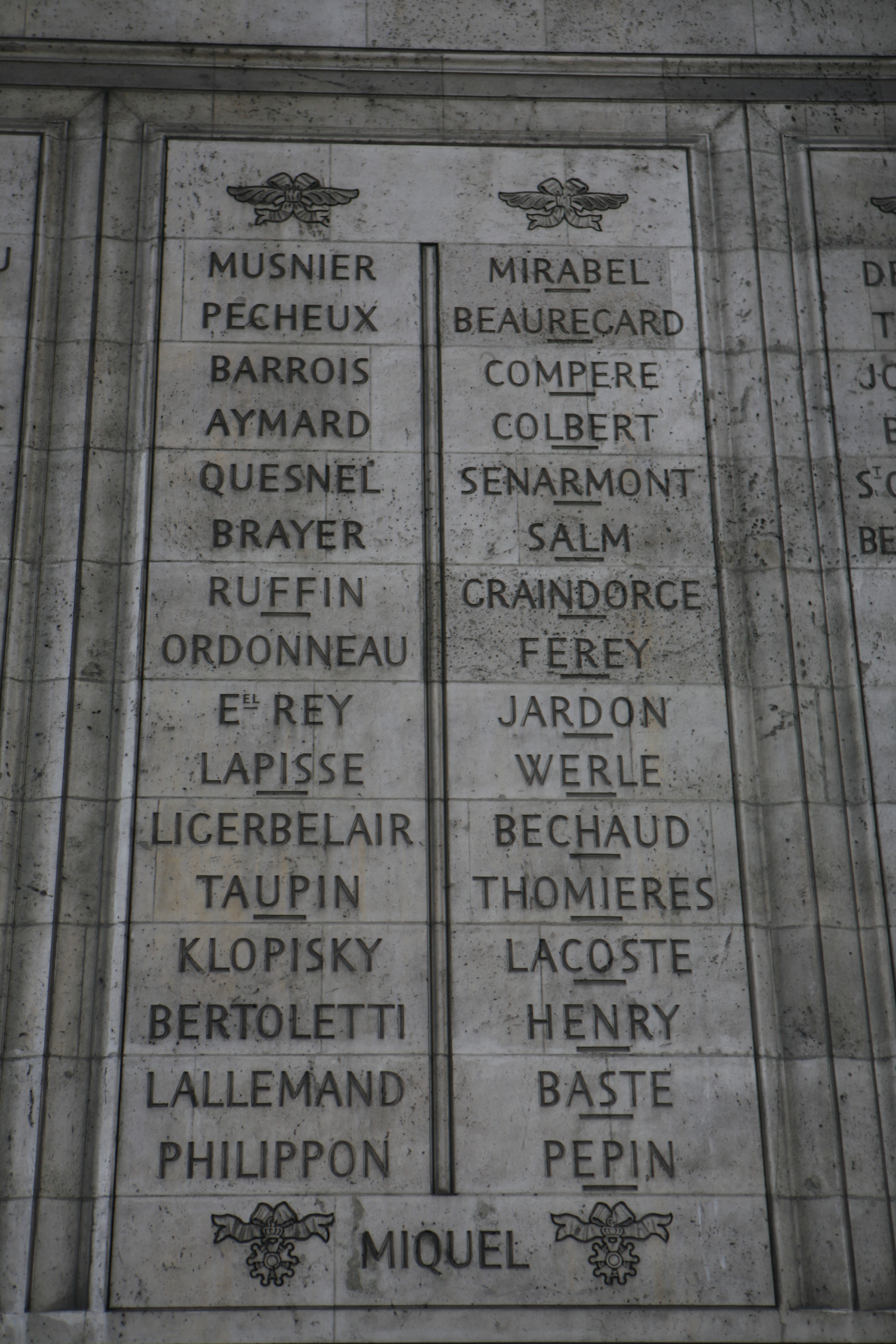
- LAPISSE is the tenth name on Column 37 (left) of the Arc de Triomphe.
- Born: 25 November 1762; Lyon, France
- Died: 30 July 1809 (aged 46) Santa Olalla, Spain
- Allegiance: France
- Branch: Infantry
- Service years: 1779–1809
- Rank: General of Division
- Conflicts: American Revolutionary War; War of the First Coalition; Siege of Bastia; Battle of Rivoli; War of the Second Coalition; Second Battle of Zurich; Napoleonic Wars; Capitulation of Dornbirn; Battle of Jena; Battle of Kołoząb; Battle of Golymin; Battle of Eylau; Battle of Friedland; Battle of Espinosa; Battle of Alcantara; Battle of Talavera †
- Awards: Légion d'Honneur, CC 1804; Order of the Iron Crown, 1808
- Other work: Baron of the Empire, 1808

Pierre Belon Lapisse, Baron de Sainte-Hélène (French pronunciation: [pjɛʁ bəlɔ̃ lapis]; 25 November 1762 – 30 July 1809) commanded an infantry division in Napoleon's armies and was fatally wounded fighting against the British in the Peninsular War. He enlisted in the French Army during the reign of Louis XVI and fought in the American Revolutionary War. Appointed an officer at the start of the French Revolutionary Wars, he rose in rank to become a general officer by 1799. From 1805 to 1807 during the Napoleonic Wars, he led a brigade in the Grande Armée at Dornbirn, Jena, Kołoząb, Golymin, and Eylau. After promotion he commanded a division in the thick of the action at Friedland in 1807.

In 1808, Napoleon ennobled Lapisse and transferred him to Spain where he led his division at Espinosa. Detailed to lead one of three columns that were invade Portugal, he was completely outmaneuvered by an inferior force. He surprised and defeated a British infantry division in the Casa de Salinas action, but was mortally wounded the following day during heavy fighting at Talavera. Lapisse is one of the names inscribed under the Arc de Triomphe, on Column 37.

== Early career ==
Lapisse was born into the family of a tapestry weaver in Lyons on 25 November 1762. He enlisted on 5 April 1779 in the Armagnac Infantry Regiment, which had been created by splitting it from the old Navarre Regiment. He fought with the unit in the American Revolutionary War and was promoted to sergeant in 1784.

== French Revolution ==
After the outbreak of the French Revolution Lapisse was named lieutenant in the Corsican Chasseurs Free Company on 19 December 1789. This unit was incorporated into the 16th Light Infantry Battalion. On 9 May 1793 he was promoted adjutant major when the battalion was expanded into the 16th Light Infantry Demi-brigade. He became captain on 2 August 1793 and chef de bataillon (major) on 22 March 1794. In this period Lapisse served in Corsica, including the Siege of Bastia during which he was wounded. He then fought against the Kingdom of Piedmont-Sardinia and was promoted chef de brigade (colonel) on 26 March 1795. He was wounded at Ormea. On 8 November 1795 he was named the commander of the 83rd Line Infantry Demi-brigade.

At the beginning of 1796 the 83rd was part of André Mouret's 1st Division of the Coast in the Army of Italy. After the Second Amalgame in May 1796, the 83rd became the 57th Line Infantry Demi-brigade with Lapisse as chef de brigade on 19 June 1796. The demi-brigade fought at the Battle of La Favorita which took place on 16 January 1797 and was part of the Battle of Rivoli. The 57th also participated in the spring campaign in Carinthia including the Battle of Valvasone on 16 March 1797.

In 1798, Lapisse and the 57th were assigned first to the Army of England and later to the Army of Mainz. On 10 June 1799 he was appointed chef de brigade of the 36th Line Infantry Demi-brigade. In mid-September that year, the 36th was part of Jean-de-Dieu Soult's division in André Masséna's army in Switzerland. During the Second Battle of Zurich on 25 September 1799, Soult launched a surprise assault crossing of the Linth River while the French main body under André Masséna attacked the Russians at Zurich. The Austrian commander on the Linth, Friedrich Freiherr von Hotze was killed and his command defeated. Lapisse received a battlefield promotion to general of brigade on 26 September 1799. Subsequently, Lapisse fought with the Army of Italy under Guillaume Brune and Bon-Adrien Jeannot de Moncey. On 12 January 1801 he had his horse killed under him at Castelfranco Veneto while leading the 1st Brigade of the Advance Guard. After the peace he commanded French troops in Liguria from 1801 to 1803. He became a member of the Légion d'Honneur on 11 December 1803.

== Empire ==
=== Ulm to Friedland ===
Lapisse became a Commander of the Légion d'Honneur on 14 June 1804. That year he was appointed to command a brigade in the 1st Division in Marshal Pierre Augereau's VII Corps at Brest. The 1st Division was present at the Capitulation of Dornbirn on 13 November 1805 when Franz Jellacic surrendered an Austrian division numbering three generals, 160 officers and 3,895 soldiers to Augereau. At the Battle of Jena on 14 October 1806, Lapisse led a brigade in Jacques Desjardin's 1st Division of VII Corps. The unit included four battalions of the 16th Light Infantry Regiment. On 24 December, Desjardin's division secured a bridgehead on the Wkra River at Kołoząb against strong Russian resistance. While this struggle was taking place, Lapisse took a task force downstream, surprised the bridge guard at Pruszkowo and gained an additional crossing. He fought at the Battle of Golymin and was promoted to general of division a few days later on 30 December 1806.

In February 1807, he led his brigade at the Battle of Eylau where the VII Corps suffered very heavy losses. Ordered to attack the Russian left flank, Augereau's men soon disappeared into a blizzard. Losing their sense of direction, the corps instead assaulted the enemy center which was defended by a 70-gun battery. Crushed by artillery fire and ridden down by Russian cavalry the survivors fled. The shattered corps was later broken up and its units redistributed throughout the army. At the Battle of Friedland, Lapisse commanded the 2nd Division in Marshal Claude Perrin Victor's I Corps. The division included two battalions each of the 16th Light, 8th Line, 45th Line, and 54th Line Infantry Regiments. Michel Ney's VI Corps started the French attack from the right flank. When Ney's soldiers faltered, Emperor Napoleon committed the I Corps from the army reserve. As Victor's troops drove a wedge into the Russian center, Ney's corps returned to the attack on their right. Aided by Victor's exceptionally well-handled corps artillery, the French defeated the Russian Imperial Guard and fought their way into Friedland, ending the battle.

=== Spain ===
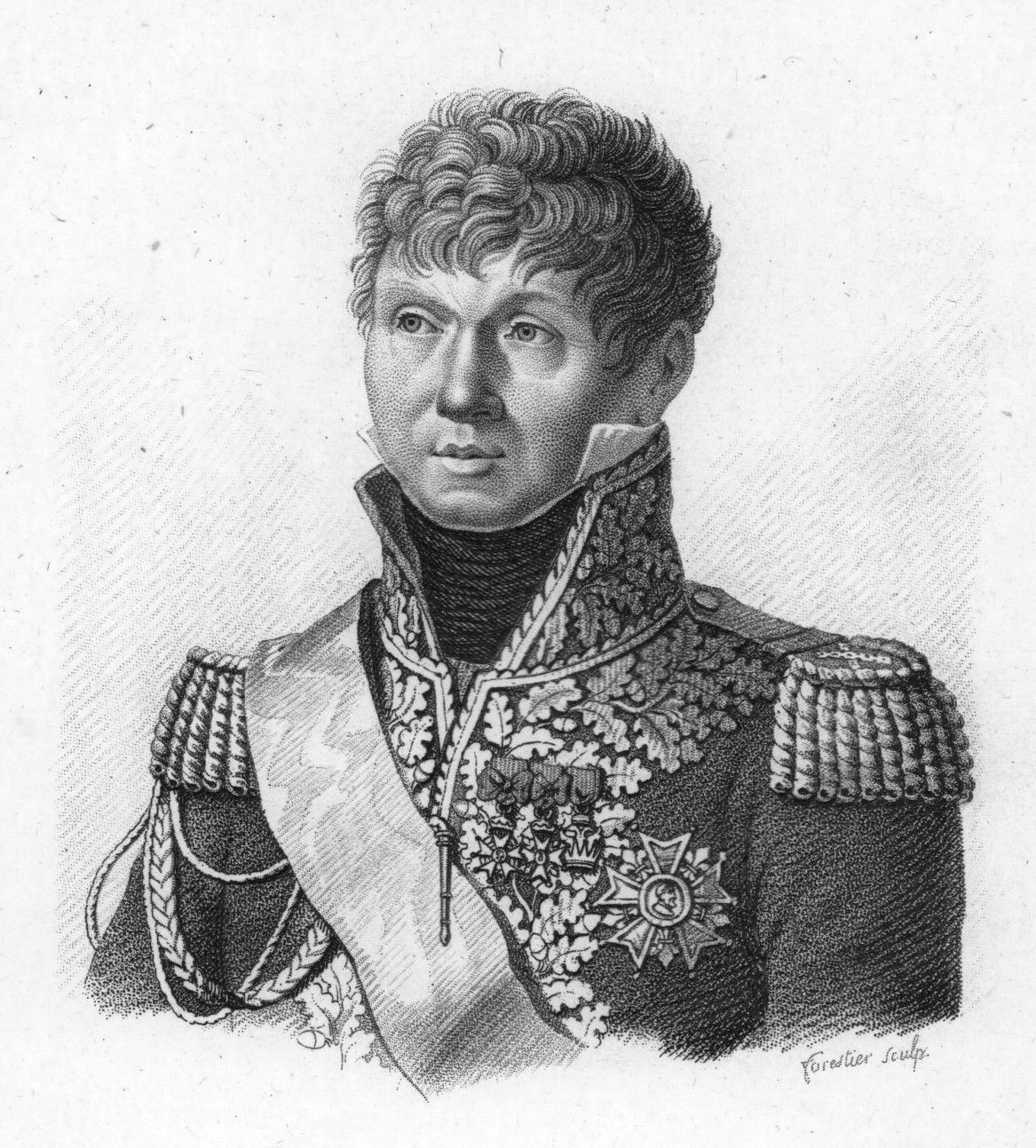
Claude Perrin Victor

In 1808 Lapisse was made a Baron of the Empire with the title Sainte-Hélène and received the Order of the Iron Crown. By October of that year, Victor's I Corps was transferred to Spain to fight in the Peninsular War. Lapisse commanded the 2nd Division, made up of the same regiments as at Friedland, only with three battalions each. Lapisse fought at the Battle of Espinosa de los Monteros on 10 and 11 November 1808. On the 10th Eugène-Casimir Villatte recklessly threw his division at the Spanish army of Joaquín Blake y Joyes without waiting for Victor's other two divisions to arrive. The attack fell on the Division of the North which had recently escaped from Denmark and was repulsed. When Victor came up with his other two divisions, he sent one regiment of Lapisse's division and one brigade of Francois Amable Ruffin's division against the same defenders. Though Blake had to send reinforcements, the Spanish were able to drive off the French attackers. On the 11th Victor reasoned that Blake would expect his right flank to be attacked again, the same as the previous day. On this day, Lapisse launched an assault on the Spanish left flank on a very high ridge. This time the defenders were not of the same quality as the Division of the North. After their division commander and two brigadiers were wounded, the Spanish troops bolted for the rear. One of Lapisse's brigadiers, Nicolas Joseph Maison wheeled his troops against Blake's center just as Victor ordered a frontal attack by the rest of I Corps. The Spanish army disintegrated and took to the hills. Victor lost about 1,000 killed and wounded. The Division of the North suffered about 1,000 casualties while Blake's total losses were about 3,000. On 1 January 1809 Emperor Napoleon ordered Lapisse to detach from I Corps and operate in the Province of León. Two brigades of cavalry under Archange Louis Rioult-Davenay and Pierre-Honoré-Anne Maupetit were assigned to Lapisse's force. Despite Victor's pleas to return his 2nd Division, King Joseph Bonaparte obstinately refused.

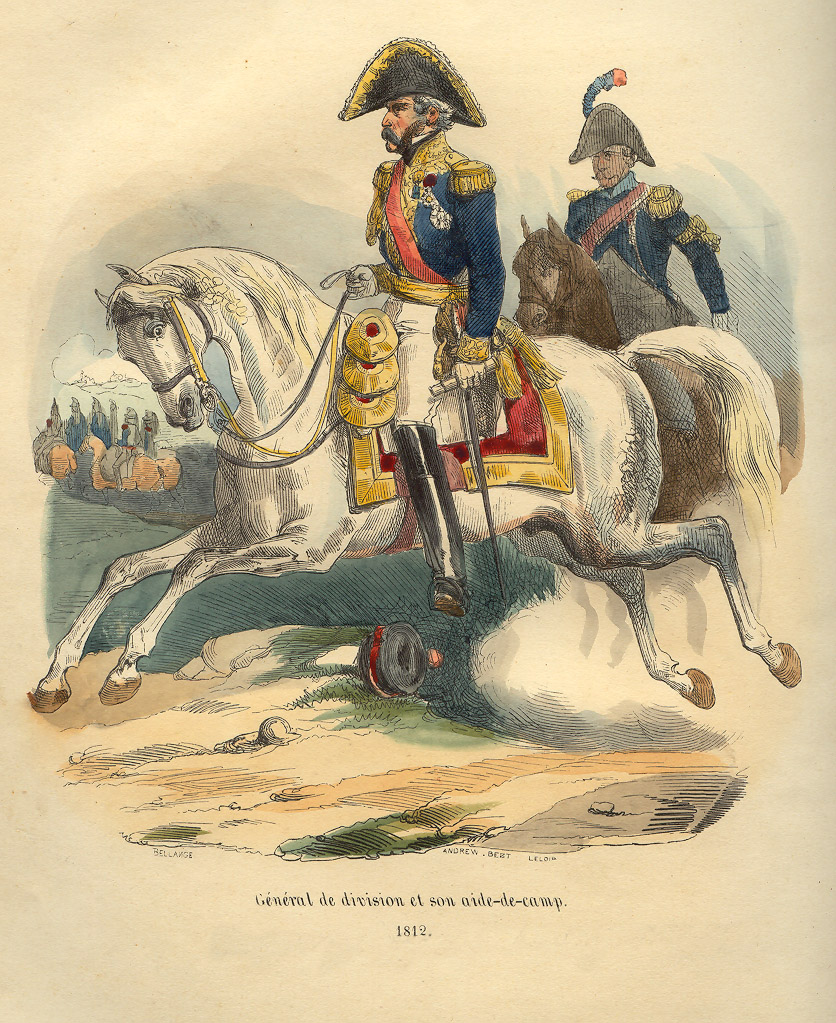
French General of Division

Instead, Napoleon planned on launching an invasion of Portugal from three directions, with Soult and 20,000 men overrunning the north, Lapisse with 9,000 troops advancing from the east, and Victor pushing in from the south. Robert Wilson's aggressive use of his 1,200 Portuguese regular troops completely fooled Lapisse, who became convinced that he was outnumbered and halted his advance. Baffled by Wilson's maneuvers, he was withdrawn and ordered to rejoin Victor. On 14 May 1809 Lapisse brushed aside Colonel Mayne's 1,850 Portuguese regulars and militia in the Battle of Alcantara in Extremadura. Lapisse's 2nd Division and a brigade of dragoons were engaged, a total of 9,500 soldiers and 12 guns. The Portuguese lost 250 men while French casualties were described as light. Lapisse's men sacked the town before rendezvousing with Victor at Mérida. Two days before, the British army of Arthur Wellesley's won a victory over Soult's corps at the Second Battle of Porto and chased him out of Portugal. So ended the second unsuccessful French invasion of that nation.

On 27 July 1809, as Victor pursued Gregorio García de la Cuesta's Spanish army, Arthur Wellesley's British troops attempted to cover their retreat across the Alberche River. Having successfully overseen the withdrawal of the Spanish infantry, Alexander Randoll Mackenzie's British 3rd Division pulled back to the west bank. The British cavalry had been withdrawn because it was useless in the wooded area near the Casa de Salinas in which Mackenzie's troops were situated. Lapisse's division crossed the Alberche farther north undetected and was able to get close to the British formation because its pickets were badly posted. Wellesley was there in person and even he was completely taken by surprise as Lapisse's division rolled forward against Mackenzie's left flank. With the 16th Light Infantry in the front line with the other three regiments in support, the French fell on Rufane Shaw Donkin's brigade, breaking the 2nd Battalion of the 87th Foot, 1st Battalion of the 88th Foot and 2nd Battalion of the 31st Foot and taking 80 prisoners. The 1st Battalion of the 45th Foot and a half-battalion of the 60th Foot held firm and covered the retreat of the beaten units. Though Lapisse aggressively pressed forward, Mackenzie's division was able to fall back to the main position in good order well-protected by the 14th Light Dragoons and the 1st Light Dragoons of the King's German Legion (KGL). However, the Casa de Salinas action cost the British 447 casualties, including 70 killed, 284 wounded, and 93 missing. The 87th alone lost 198 casualties. Lapisse's losses were probably less than 100.

On 28 July 1809 at the Battle of Talavera, Lapisse's 6,862-strong division consisted of the same organization as at Espinosa. At 2:00 pm, 80 French cannons began firing on the British infantry positions, inflicting losses. The fire of the 30 British and six Spanish field pieces was quickly suppressed. Lapisse advanced together with the divisions of Horace François Bastien, baron Sébastiani and Jean François Leval. The Dutch-German division of Leval on the left struck the British line first and was defeated; a second attack later in the day met the same fate. At about 3:00 pm, Sébastiani in the center and Lapisse on the right closed with John Coape Sherbrooke's British-KGL division. Each French division was 12 battalions strong with the front line deployed in column of divisions and the rear line in column of battalions. Lapisse's front line consisted of Jean-Gregoire Laplane's brigade, the 16th Light and the 45th Line. In front of Lapisse were two KGL brigades under Ernst Langwerth and Sigismund Löw plus the 2nd Battalion of the 83rd Foot. The French skirmish line pressed back the less numerous skirmishers of their enemies. Despite taking losses from musketry, Sherbrooke's troops waited until the French were within 50 yards (46 m) then fired a murderous volley. The French infantry were cut down in hundreds and the survivors took to their heels with their enemies in pursuit. However, the British Guards and KGL units went too far and when they came up against the intact French second line, they were defeated. The troops facing Lapisse were badly mauled; the 2nd KGL Infantry Battalion sustained 387 casualties in 20 minutes and the 5th KGL lost over 100 men captured. Langwerth was killed. The divisions of Sébastiani and Lapisse again advanced into contact with the British line, into which Wellesley threw his reserves. Soon a terrific firefight raged. After losing 1,700 men and inflicting about the same number, the French fell back, their attack beaten. Lapisse was fatally wounded during the attack. He died at Santa Olalla two days later. LAPISSE is engraved on Column 37 of the Arc de Triomphe. (Note: See Arc de Triomphe photo.)

== Notes ==
Footnotes

Citations
