= Francisco da Silveira, 1st Count of Amarante =

Francisco da Silveira Pinto da Fonseca Teixeira
- Count of Amarante
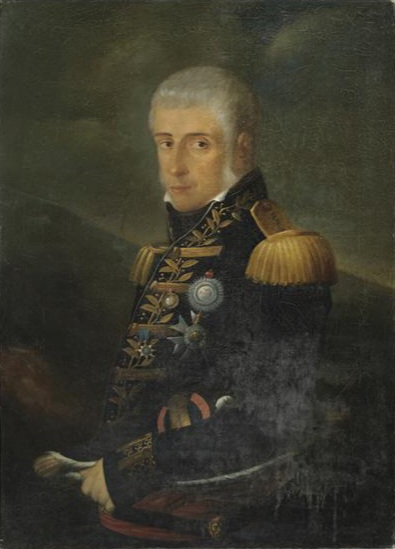
- 19th-century portrait at the Palace of Ajuda
- Successor: Manuel da Silveira Pinto da Fonseca Teixeira, 2nd Count of Amarante, 1st Marquess of Chaves
- Full name: Francisco da Silveira Pinto da Fonseca Teixeira
- Born: 1 September 1763; Peso da Régua, Portugal
- Died: 27 May 1821 (aged 57); Vila Real, Portugal
- Noble family: Fonseca Teixeira
- Father: Manuel da Silveira Pinto da Fonseca
- Mother: Antónia Silveira
- Occupation: Lieutenant General (War of the Oranges, Peninsular War)

D. Francisco da Silveira Pinto da Fonseca Teixeira, 1st Count of Amarante (1 September 1763 – 27 May 1821) was a Portuguese army officer who fought in the War of the Oranges and the Peninsular War.

== Biography ==
Francisco da Silveira was born in the town of Canelas (now Peso da Régua), the son of Manuel da Silveira Pinto da Fonseca and Antónia Silveira.

=== Career ===
He became a cadet in the Almeida Cavalry Regiment on 25 April 1780, from which his career developed in subsequent years: he was promoted to ensign by 27 February 1790; then lieutenant in the 6th Cavalry Regiment, then called the Light Regiment of Chaves, on 17 December 1792, before becoming a captain and adjunct-aide to the field marshal of the Province of Beira, João Brun da Silveira, on 17 December 1799. He succeeded his father as the Majorat of Espírito Santo on 22 February 1785.

During the war between France and Spain (in 1801), Francisco da Silveira, along with other important people in the province, raised a voluntary corp, and as sergeant figured in the Monterei company, commanded by Gomes Freire de Andrade. He was rewarded by being assigned to the 6th Cavalry Regiment, first as sergeant, then as lieutenant commander on 14 March 1803.

=== Peninsular wars ===
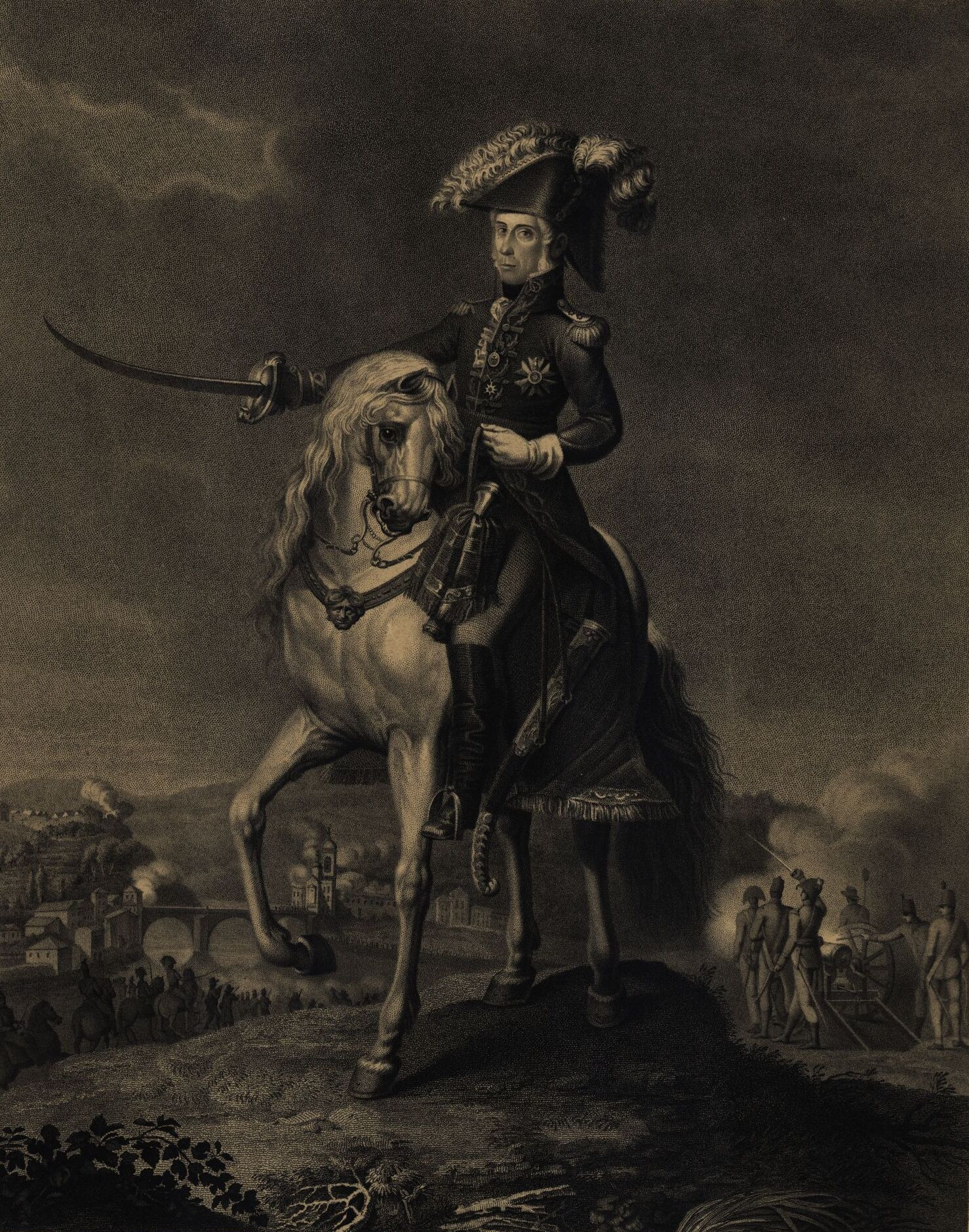
Equestrian portrait, 1811, engraving by Raimundo Joaquim da Costa after an original drawing by João Baptista Ribeiro

He commanded the cavalry in 1807, when the Portuguese army was ordered to march from the borders to the coast. He was in Aveiro, when in December he was called to Coimbra to testify for the annihilation of the 6th, 9th, 11th and 12th Regiments by General Junot. With the fall of the monarchy in sight, he escaped to Porto in order to board an English ship, where he assumed would take him to Brazil. His plan foiled, he escaped to Vila Real, where he later became one of the factors in the acclamation of the legitimate government in 1808.

A small victory over the French was achieved at the end of June 1808 at Padrões de Teixeira. In March 1809 he led a force which carried out the successful Siege of Chaves, defeating its French garrison. He kept the French from capturing Amarante from 18 April to 3 May 1809 during the second French invasion of Portugal. Driven out, he later recaptured the place and helped cut off the forces of Nicolas Soult, forcing the French marshal to abandon his artillery and wagon trains in order to escape. He commanded a Portuguese division in Arthur Wellesley, Marquess of Wellington's Allied army at the Battle of Vitoria on 21 June 1813.

=== After the war ===
Following the Peninsular War, which ended in 1814, Silveira returned to his position as Military Governor of the Province of Trás-os-Montes. In 1820, when the Liberal Revolution broke out on 24 August, he was asked to join the side of the Provisional Junta of Porto. However, he refused and instead gathered the troops of the Trás-os-Montes province in Chaves with the opposing objective: to combat the revolution. He was unsuccessful in this endeavor, as his troops ultimately sided with the Junta of Porto. Following this episode, Silveira retired to Vila Real, where he passed away the following year. He was laid to rest in the family tomb at the Chapel of the Holy Spirit (Capela do Espírito Santo) in Canelas (Peso da Régua).
