= Upper house =

Chamber of a bicameral legislature

An upper house is one of two chambers of a bicameral legislature, the other chamber being the lower house. The house formally designated as the upper house is usually smaller and often has more restricted power than the lower house. A legislature composed of only one house (and which therefore has neither an upper house nor a lower house) is described as unicameral.

In countries where English is widely used, the most common name for the upper house of a national legislature is the Senate, including in Australia, Canada, Kenya, Nigeria, the Philippines, the United States, among others.

== History ==
While the senate of the ancient Roman kingdom was the first assembly of aristocrats counseling a monarch, the first upper house of a bicameral legislature was the medieval House of Lords consisting of the archbishops, bishops, abbots, and nobility, which emerged during the reign of King Edward III around 1341 when the Parliament clearly separated into two distinct chambers, the House of Commons, consisting of the shire and borough representatives, and the House of Lords.

In 1808, Spain adopted the Bayonne Statute to justify Joseph Bonaparte as king of Spain. While never fully put into practice, the country saw liberal reform. During resistance to Napoleonic invasions, Spain adopted a liberal constitution in 1812. 1834 Queen Maria Christina established the House of Peers alongside the Deputies of the Realm. With the constitution of 1837 it was named Senate. Members were royal princes, hereditary nobility and clergy, and one appointed member for every 85,000 inhabitants. The Spanish upper house was suppressed in 1923, and in 1977 established an elected regional chamber.

Following Spain's example, free-thinking Vintistas were able to govern Portugal and adopt the constitution of 1822. During the subsequent Liberal Wars the Chamber of Most Worthy Peers was established in 1826 as the upper house of the Cortes Gerais. Its 90 members were nominated by the monarch. The september revolution abolished the upper house in favor of an elected senate from 1838 to 1842, when the constitution of 1826 was reinstated. In 1911 the upper house was abolished, and a bicameral parliament, the congress established, again with the senate as its regional representation.

In 1831, after its independence from the Netherlands, Belgium adopted a constitution with a Senate where its members were partially appointed by the king, and partially elected by local authorities.

Landtag of Prussia had from 1850 onward the Prussian House of Lords, besides the Prussian House of Representatives. The Austrian Imperial Council had from 1861 onward a House of Lords besides the House of Deputies.

In 1889 imperial Japan modeled its house of peers according to Prussian House of Lords, with its first modern Meiji constitution. With the constitution of 1947 the upper house was replaced with the House of Councillors modeled after the US senate.

== Justification and powers ==
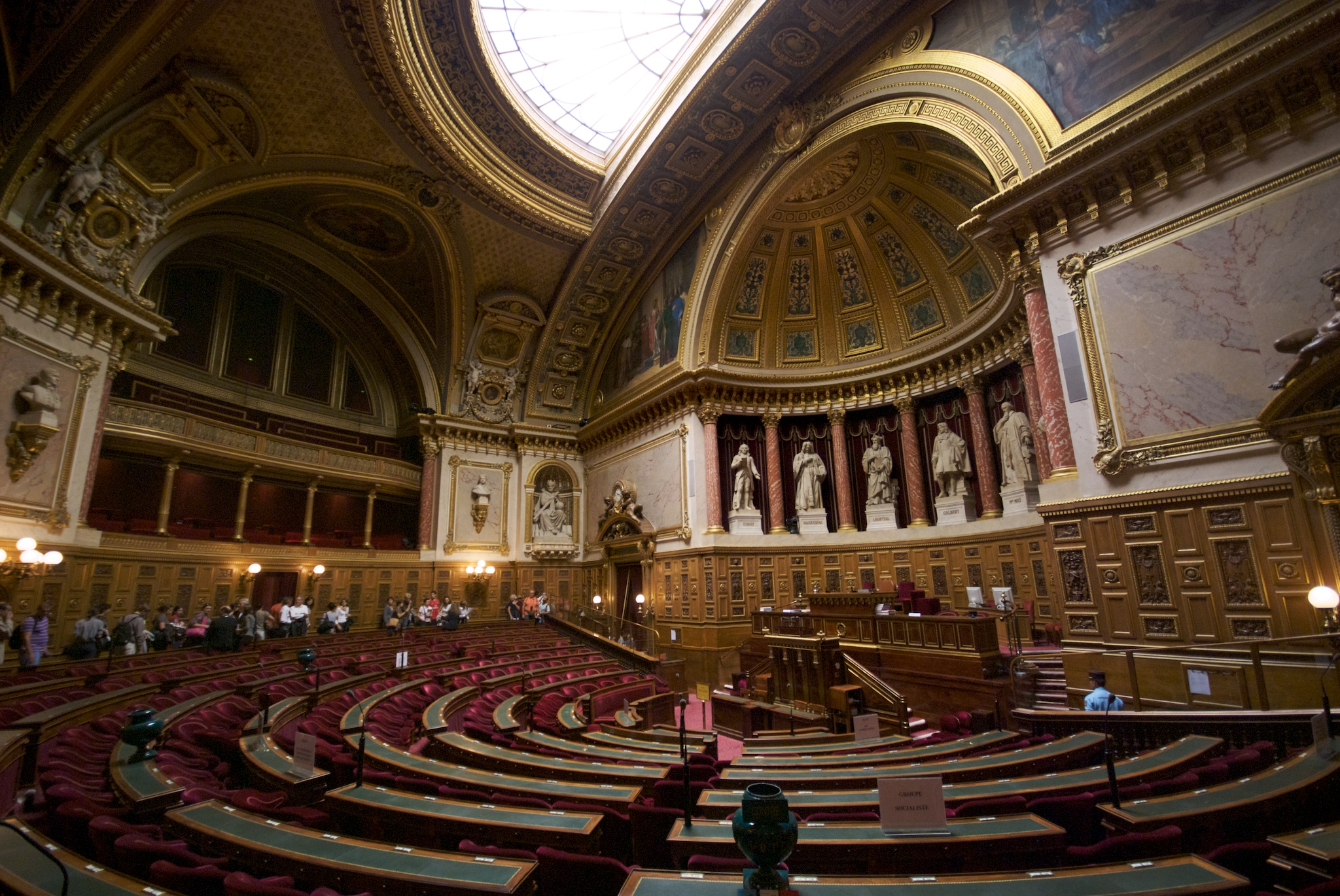
The French Senate, hosted in the Luxembourg Palace

Justifications for the political legitimacy of an upper house include:

- Mitigation of the tyranny of the majority through the concurrent majority together with the lower house.
- Reduction of the volatility of majoritarianism through convergence towards the median voter.

=== Parliamentary systems ===
In parliamentary systems the upper house is frequently seen as an advisory or a "house of review" chamber; for this reason, its powers of direct action are often reduced in some way. Some or all of the following restrictions are often placed on upper houses:

- Lack of control over the executive branch. (By contrast, in the US and many other presidential systems, the Senate or upper chamber has more control over the composition of the Cabinet and the administration generally, through its prerogative of confirming the president's nominations to senior offices.)
- No absolute veto of proposed legislation, though suspensive vetoes are permitted in some states.
- In countries where it can veto legislation (such as the Netherlands), it may not be able to amend the proposals.
- A reduced or even absent role in initiating legislation.
- No power to block supply, or budget measures. (A rare example of a parliamentary upper house that does possess this power is the Australian Senate, which notably exercised that power in 1975.)

In parliamentary democracies and among European upper houses the Italian Senate is a notable exception to these general rules, in that it has the same powers as its lower counterpart: any law can be initiated in either house and must be approved in the same form by both houses. Additionally, a Government must have the consent of both to remain in office, a position which is known as "perfect bicameralism" or "equal bicameralism."

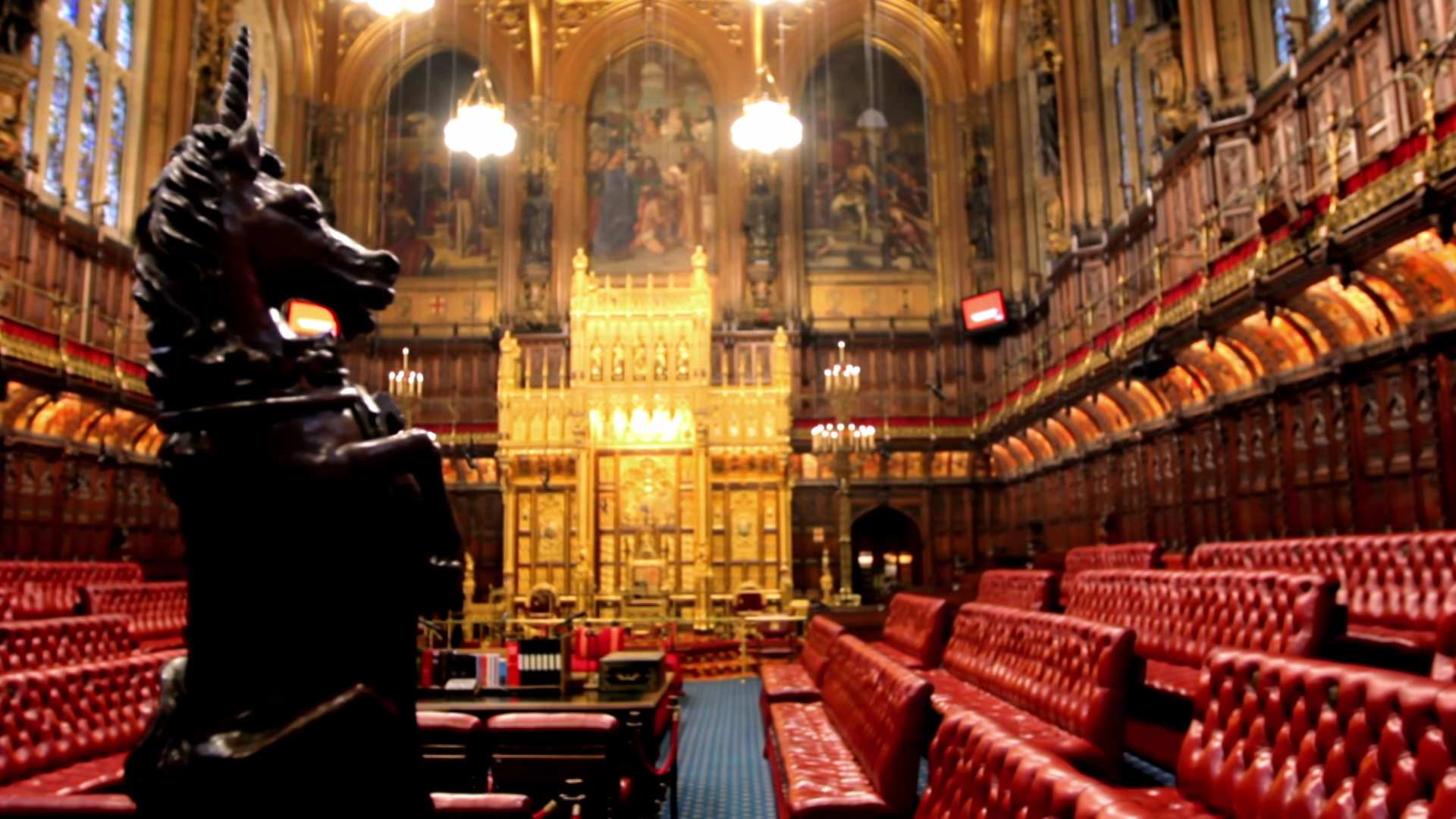
The chamber of the House of Lords, the UK's Upper House

The role of a revising chamber is to scrutinise legislation that may have been drafted over-hastily in the lower house and to suggest amendments that the lower house may nevertheless reject if it wishes to. An example is the British House of Lords. Under the Parliament Acts 1911 and 1949, the House of Lords can no longer prevent the passage of most bills, but it must be given an opportunity to debate them and propose amendments, and can thereby delay the passage of a bill with which it disagrees. Bills can only be delayed for up to one year before the Commons can use the Parliament Act, although economic bills can only be delayed for one month.

The House of Lords is sometimes seen as having a special role of safeguarding the uncodified Constitution of the United Kingdom and important civil liberties against ill-considered change.

The House of Lords has a number of ways to block legislation and to reject it; however, the House of Commons can eventually use the Parliament Act to force something through. The Commons will often accept amendments passed by the Lords; however, the two houses have sometimes reached a constitutional standoff. For example, when the Labour Government of 1999 tried to expel all hereditary peers from the Lords, the Lords threatened to wreck the Government's entire legislative agenda and to block every bill which was sent to the chamber. This standoff led to negotiations between Viscount Cranborne, the then Shadow Leader of the House, and the Labour Government, resulting in the Weatherill Amendment to the House of Lords Act 1999, which preserved 92 hereditary peers in the house. Compromise and negotiation between the two houses make the Parliament Act a very rarely used backup plan.

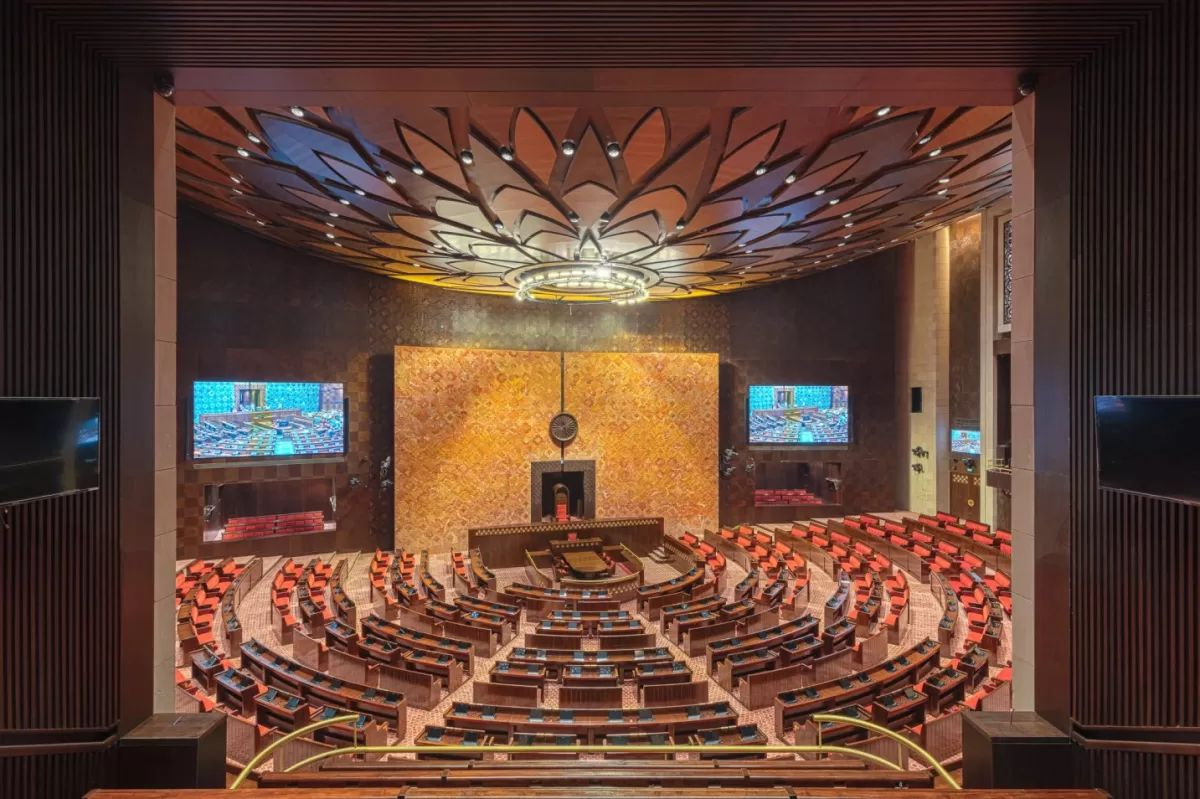
The chamber of the Council of States (Rajya Sabha), the Indian Parliament's Upper House

Even without a veto, an upper house may defeat legislation. Its opposition may give the lower chamber a chance to reconsider or even abandon a controversial measure. It can also delay a bill so that it does not fit within the legislative schedule, or until a general election produces a new lower house that no longer wishes to proceed with the bill.

Nevertheless, some states have long retained powerful upper houses. For example, the consent of the upper house to legislation may be necessary (though, as noted above, this seldom extends to budgetary measures). Constitutional arrangements of states with powerful upper houses usually include a means to resolve situations where the two houses are at odds with each other.

In recent times, parliamentary systems have tended to weaken the powers of upper houses relative to their lower counterparts. Some upper houses have been fully abolished; others have had their powers reduced by constitutional or legislative amendments. Also, conventions often exist that the upper house ought not to obstruct the business of government for frivolous or merely partisan reasons. These conventions have tended to harden with a passage of time.

Though usually constitutionally subordinate to the lower house regarding the enactment of primary legislation, upper houses in parliamentary systems may have greater power over the passage of secondary legislation: For example both the German Bundesrat and the British House of Lords have the capacity to fully veto delegated legislation.

=== Presidential systems ===
In presidential systems, the upper house is frequently given other powers to compensate for its restrictions:

- Executive appointments, to the cabinet and other offices, usually require its approval, mainly in the United States.

== Institutional structure ==
There are a variety of ways an upper house's members are assembled: by direct or indirect election, appointment or a mixture of these. Many upper houses are indirectly elected or (partially or completely) appointed: either by the head of state, by the head of government or in some other way. This is usually intended to produce a house of experts or otherwise distinguished citizens, who would not necessarily be returned in an election. For example, members of the Senate of Canada are appointed by the Governor General on the advice of the Prime Minister.

In the past, some upper houses had seats that were entirely hereditary, such as in the British House of Lords until 1999 and in the Japanese House of Peers until it was abolished in 1947.

It is also common that the upper house consists of delegates chosen by state governments or local officials. Members of the Rajya Sabha in India are nominated by various states and union territories, while 12 of them are nominated by the President of India. Similarly, at the state level, one-third of the members of the State Legislative Council (Vidhan Parishad) are nominated by local governments, one-third by sitting legislators, and the rest are elected by select members of the electorate. The United States Senate was chosen by state legislatures until the passage of the Seventeenth Amendment in 1913.

The upper house may be directly elected but in different proportions to the lower house - for example, the senates of Australia, Brazil and the United States have a fixed number of elected members from each state, regardless of the population.

== Abolition ==
Many jurisdictions once possessed upper houses but abolished them to adopt unicameral systems, including Croatia, Denmark, Estonia, Hungary, Iceland, Iran, Mauritania, New Zealand, Sweden, Turkey, Venezuela, many Indian states, Brazilian states, Canadian provinces, subnational entities such as Queensland, and some other jurisdictions. Newfoundland had a Legislative Council prior to joining Canada, as did Ontario when it was Upper Canada and Quebec from 1791 (as Lower Canada) to 1968.

Nebraska is the only state in the United States with a unicameral legislature, having abolished its lower house in 1934, while the Senate of Nebraska, the upper house prior to 1934, continues to assemble.

The Australian state of Queensland also once had an appointed Legislative Council before abolishing it in 1922. All other Australian states continue to have bicameral systems, though all members are now directly elected (the two self-governing territories, along with Norfolk Island until 2016, have always been unicameral).

Like Queensland, the German state of Bavaria had an appointed second chamber, the Senate of Bavaria, from 1946 to 1999.

The Senate of the Philippines was abolished – and restored – twice: from 1935 to 1945 when a unicameral National Assembly convened, and from 1972 to 1987 when Congress was closed, and later a new constitution was approved instituting a unicameral Parliament. The Senate was re-instituted with the restoration of a bicameral Congress via a constitutional amendment in 1941, and via adoption of a new constitution in 1987.

A previous government of Ireland (the 31st Dáil) promised a referendum on the abolition of its upper house, the Seanad Éireann, during the 24th Seanad session. By a narrow margin, the Irish public voted to retain it. Conservative-leaning Fine Gael and Left-leaning Sinn Féin both supported the abolition, while the centrist Fianna Fáil was alone among major parties in supporting the retention of the Seanad.

== Titles of upper houses ==
=== Common terms ===
- Senate — by far the most common
- Legislative Council (Indian states having upper houses; Isle of Man; and every Australian state that has an upper house)
- Federal Council (Germany, Austria)
- Council of States (Switzerland, India (Rajya Sabha), Sudan)
- First Chamber — Netherlands (formerly, Sweden)
- House of Lords – seen in the United Kingdom, as well as formerly in Ireland and in German-speaking monarchies (Herrenhaus), e.g. the Austrian House of Lords and the Prussian House of Lords

=== Unique titles ===
Government	Upper house unique title	Translation
Bosnia and Herzegovina	Dom naroda	House of Peoples
Denmark	Landstinget	Deliberative assembly
Ethiopia	Yefedereshn Mekir Bet	House of Federation
India	Rajya Sabha	Council of States
India	Vidhan Parishad	Legislative Council
Indonesia	Dewan Perwakilan Daerah	Regional Representative Council
Japan	Sangiin	House of Councillors (1947-2026); Senate (2026-)
Kingdom of Hungary	Főrendiház	House of Magnates
Malaysia	Dewan Negara	State Council (Senate)
Myanmar	Amyotha Hluttaw	National Congress
Nepal	Rastriya Sabha	National Assembly
Republic of China (Taiwan)	Control Yuan	Supervisory House
Slovenia	Državni svet	National Council
Somaliland	Golaha Guurtida	House of Elders
South Africa	National Council of Provinces	
Thailand	Wutthisapha	Senior Council (Senate)
Tunisia	National Council of Regions and Districts	
Turkmenistan	Halk Maslahaty	People's Council

== See also ==
- Staggered elections
