= Kingdom of Northern Lusitania =

1807 Napoleonic proposal for Portugal

The partition of Portugal, proposed by Napoleon in the treaty of Fontainebleau (1807). The Kingdom of Northern Lusitania is marked in green.

The Kingdom of Northern Lusitania was a Kingdom proposed by Napoleon in 1807 that was ultimately never culminated. The main factors were due to the Peninsular Wars outbreak and Napoleon's downfall following years.

The Kingdom of Northern Lusitania (French: Royaume de la Lusitanie Septentrionale; Portuguese: Reino da Lusitânia Setentrional) was a proposed client state of the French Empire, intended by Napoleon in 1807 for Charles Louis, the deposed King of Etruria. It was to be established in northern Portugal, between the Douro and Minho rivers, with cities like Porto and Braga at its core.

== Major battles ==
In 1807, Portugal refused Napoleon's demand to accede to the Continental System of embargo against the United Kingdom. Napoleon, having signed the Treaty of Fontainebleau on 27 October 1807, with Spain, defined the occupation of Portugal, proposing that the country would be divided into three different states:

A French invasion under General Junot followed, and the capital city of Lisbon was captured on 1 December 1807. British intervention in the Peninsular War led by Arthur Wellesley, later the Duke of Wellington played a crucial role in preserving Portuguese independence. The last French forces were expelled from Portugal by 1812.”

In Early March 1809 the Battle of La Trepa began. A French force, led in part by Franceschi‑Delonne’s cavalry and reinforced by elements of Soult’s II Corps had a combined force of around 1,320 men. They aimed to engage the Spanish rear guard, Maj‑Gen Nicolás Mahy. Mahy’s force suffered approximately 700 casualties and while French losses were negligible, the goal of the battle was to eliminate border threats and to secure a main body of Soult’s II Corps in Portugal. These actions marked the opening phase of Soult’s Second Invasion of Portugal during the Peninsular War.

Following the skirmish at La Trepa, French forces advanced toward Chaves. Strategically placed near the Tâmega River, Chaves controlled a key route into northern Portugal. The Capture of Chaves began on March 9, 1809 and served as a strategic springboard for the continued French advance into northern Portugal. The battle involved Governor Francisco Silveira commanding a mixed force of 12,000 men, including 6,000 musketeers and 6,000 armed with pikes and other weapons. Opposing them was Franceschi‑Delonne’s reinforced contingent, estimated at 8,000 to 10,000 troops. Silveira, recognizing the futility of defending the poorly fortified town against superior numbers chose to withdraw and regroup.

After capturing Chaves, Marshal Soult’s French forces advanced south toward Braga, where a large but poorly organized Portuguese army awaited. The defenders, numbering around 24,000 men with 18 cannons were mostly local militia, many of whom armed with pikes, farming tools, or nothing at all. Their commander, Bernardim Freire de Andrade, was unpopular and indecisive. Just before the battle, his own troops launched a sudden coup d'etat. Command passed to Baron von Eben, a German officer in Portuguese service.

Soult commanded a professional force of 16,325 men and 12 guns, waited until all his divisions were in position before launching a coordinated assault on March 20, 1809. Due to the poorly trained local militia having no experience, quickly retreated and fell back. The Portuguese lines collapsed quickly, and the French cavalry pursued the fleeing militia, inflicting heavy casualties. Estimates suggest 4200 Portuguese were killed, and 17 guns were captured. French losses were minimal, between 200 and 600.

== Downfall of the state ==
After the crushing defeat at Braga, the remnants of the Portuguese forces retreated south toward Porto, a strategically important city that is easily defendable along the Douro River. Hoping to regroup and defend the city, Marshal Soult advanced with his corps and reached the outskirts of Porto by late March. The city’s defenses were hastily prepared and its garrison, composed of regular troops, militia, and armed civilians was ill-equipped to face Soult’s experienced French veterans. With cavalry support from Franceschi and Lahoussaye, Soult launched a coordinated assault on March 28, 1809. The Portuguese defenders were overwhelmed, and chaos erupted as thousands of civilians attempted to flee across the Douro River via a crowded pontoon bridge. Under the pressure, the bridge collapsed, resulting in a tragic loss of life. The French captured Porto, the scale of the assault and the civilian casualties would haunt Soult’s reputation and galvanize resistance across Portugal.

== See also ==
- Entre-Douro-e-Minho Province
- History of Portugal (1777-1834)
- Timeline of Portuguese history
