= History of Portugal (1777–1834) =

Kingdom of Portugal and the Algarves Reino de Portugal e dos Algarves (Portuguese)
- 1777–1834
- Flag Coat of arms
- Anthem: "Hymno Patriótico" (1808–1826) "Patriotic Anthem"; Hino da Carta (1826–1834) "Anthem of the Charter"
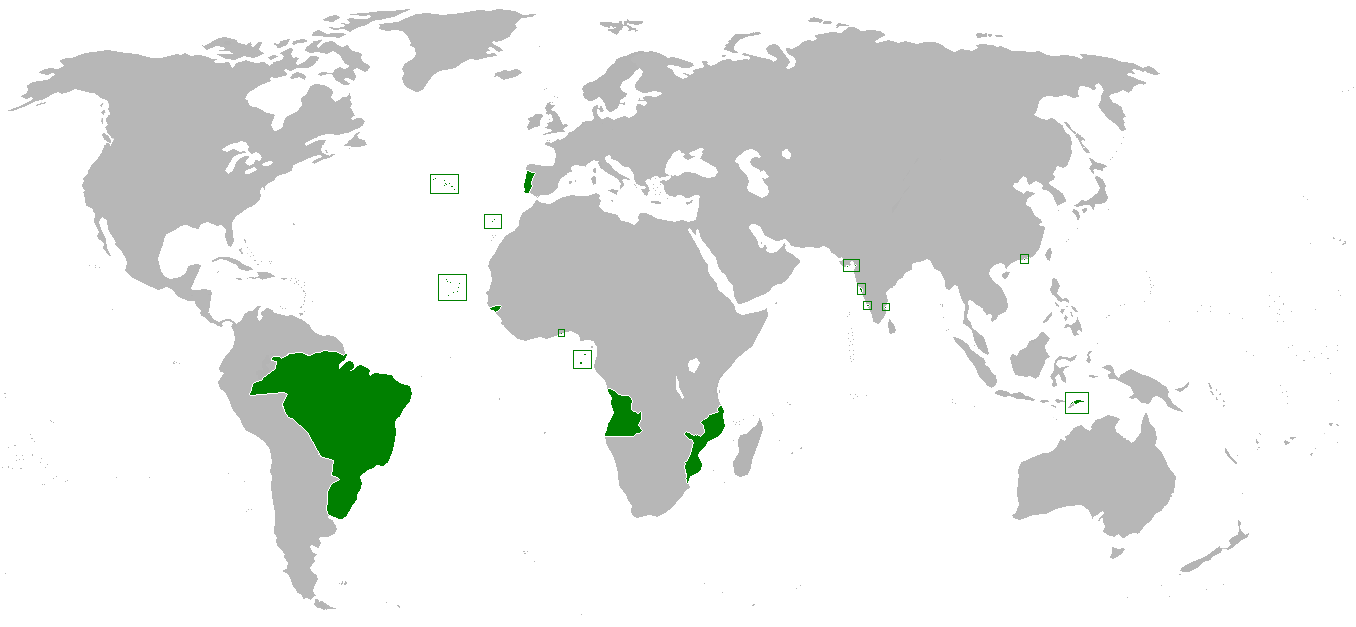
- The Second Portuguese Empire in 1800
- Capital: Lisbon (1777–1808; 1821–1834); Rio de Janeiro (1808–1821)
- Common languages: Portuguese
- Religion: Roman Catholic
- Government: Absolute monarchy (1777–1822; 1823–1826; 1828–1834); Constitutional monarchy (1822–23; 1826–1828)
- Monarch
  - 1777–1816: Mary I
  - 1816–1826: John VI
  - 1826: Pedro IV
  - 1826–1828: Mary II
  - 1828–1834: Miguel I
- History
  - Treaty of San Ildefonso: 1777
  - Peninsular War: 1807–1814
  - Independence of Brazil: 1822
  - Concession of Evoramonte: 1834
- Currency: Portuguese real
- ISO 3166 code: PT
Preceded by	Succeeded by
Kingdom of Portugal	Kingdom of Portugal

The history of the Kingdom of Portugal and the Algarves, from the First Treaty of San Ildefonso and the beginning of the reign of Queen Maria I in 1777, to the end of the Liberal Wars in 1834, spans a complex historical period in which several important political and military events led to the end of the absolutist regime and to the installation of a constitutional monarchy in the country.

In 1807, Napoleon ordered the invasion of Portugal and subsequently the royal family and its entire court migrated to Brazil, Maria I declaring the United Kingdom of Portugal, Brazil and the Algarves in 1815. This would be one of the causes for the declaration of Brazilian independence by Pedro I of Brazil in 1822, following a liberal revolution in Portugal.

The liberal period was stormy and short as Miguel of Portugal (Pedro's brother) supported an absolutist revolution endeavoring to restore all power to the monarchy. Pedro eventually returned to Portugal and fought and defeated his brother in the Liberal Wars in which liberalism prevailed and Portugal became a constitutional monarchy.

== Queen Maria I ==
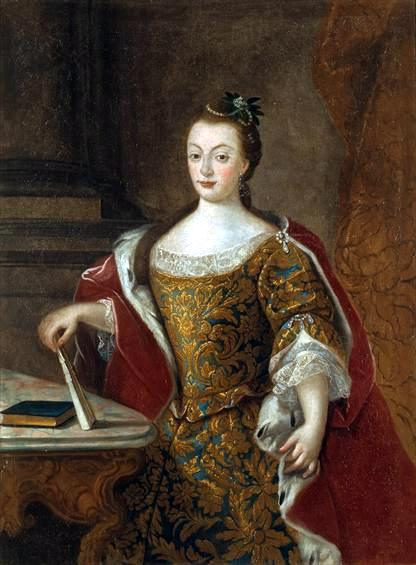
The Infanta Maria Francisca, ascended the throne to reign as Queen Maria I

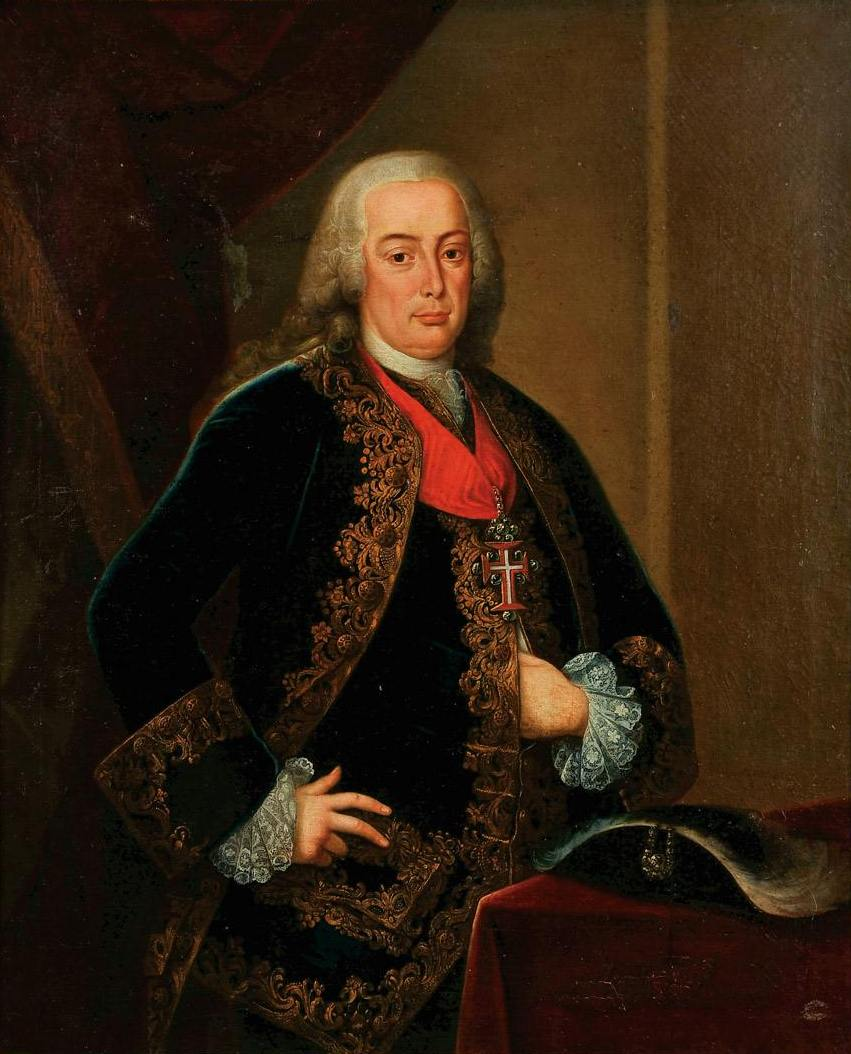
Marquis of Pombal, Queen Maria's nemesis, who was dismissed and exiled

The death of King Joseph in 1777 forced the accession of Princess Maria Francisca, his eldest daughter, to the throne of Portugal; she succeeded her father as the first Queen regnant of the 650-year-old country, which was still recovering from the 1755 Lisbon earthquake. Before becoming queen, Princess Maria and her husband, the Infante Pedro, lived on the sidelines of politics, but were clearly unsympathetic to her father's former Prime Minister, Sebastião José de Carvalho e Melo, the Marquis of Pombal, who had been the de facto ruler of the kingdom for the past 27 years. During her father's last few years, she had been the Marquis' fiercest detractor; once in power, she eagerly dismissed him and then exiled him to Pombal.

Although the queen retained many of the Marquis' other ministers, she restored most of the privileges of the nobility and clergy, and released many of Pombal's political prisoners. The economy was reorganized and Pombaline monopolies were abandoned. However, international conditions favored the economic situation in Portugal as the balance of trade was positive, helped by wine exports and a decrease of British imports. The period was, while tainted by political instability, a time of cultural renovation, marked by the completion of the Palace at Queluz, the beginnings of the Ajuda Palace, the São Carlos Theatre, the Estrela Basilica and the immense Convent of Santa Clara in Vila do Conde.

In 1789, the French Revolution caused great social upheaval in Europe. The eventual Portuguese reaction was to land forces in Catalonia, and together with the Spanish forces attack the French in the Pyrenees in the War of Roussillon (1794). The war did not go well, and by 1795, Spain had privately sued for peace, signed an alliance and aligned its external politics against Great Britain. Even as Portugal was politically divided between continuing its old alliance with Britain, its people were also divided. The French Revolution, as seen by intellectuals and progressives, was romanticized: Bocage and the Partido Francês (French Party) believed the French could usher in a liberal revolution in Europe. The French represented a threat to the traditionalist nobility who were returning to prominence and were very willing to fight them externally or internally.

It was at about this time that Queen Maria, already possessed of a religious mania, began to show signs of mental illness. When after 1799 she became incapable of handling state affairs, her son, Infante John of Braganza, began to use the title of Prince-Regent. The traditionalist adversaries of France, however, did not look to John, but rather to his wife Carlota Joaquina for support, and at one point attempted a coup against the prince.

== Continental blockade ==
John VI's regency was a complex political period that saw Portugal attempting to remain neutral in spite of the combative intransigence of its neighbors and contentious forces within the country that favored either liberal or traditional policies. Between 1795 and 1801, his government struggled to maintain a delicate balance of peace in the face of the French Continental blockade against Portugal's traditional ally, Great Britain, and the demands of the merchant classes who were prospering economically and wanted peace. Meanwhile, Spain, a former ally, had signed the Second Treaty of San Ildefonso, and was under pressure from France to coerce Portugal's cooperation, even if it required an invasion. Although Manuel de Godoy was initially hesitant to invade Portugal, due to the royal family having relatives in both countries, the French remained anxious to break the Anglo-Portuguese alliance in order to close Portuguese ports to British shipping.

=== War of the Oranges ===
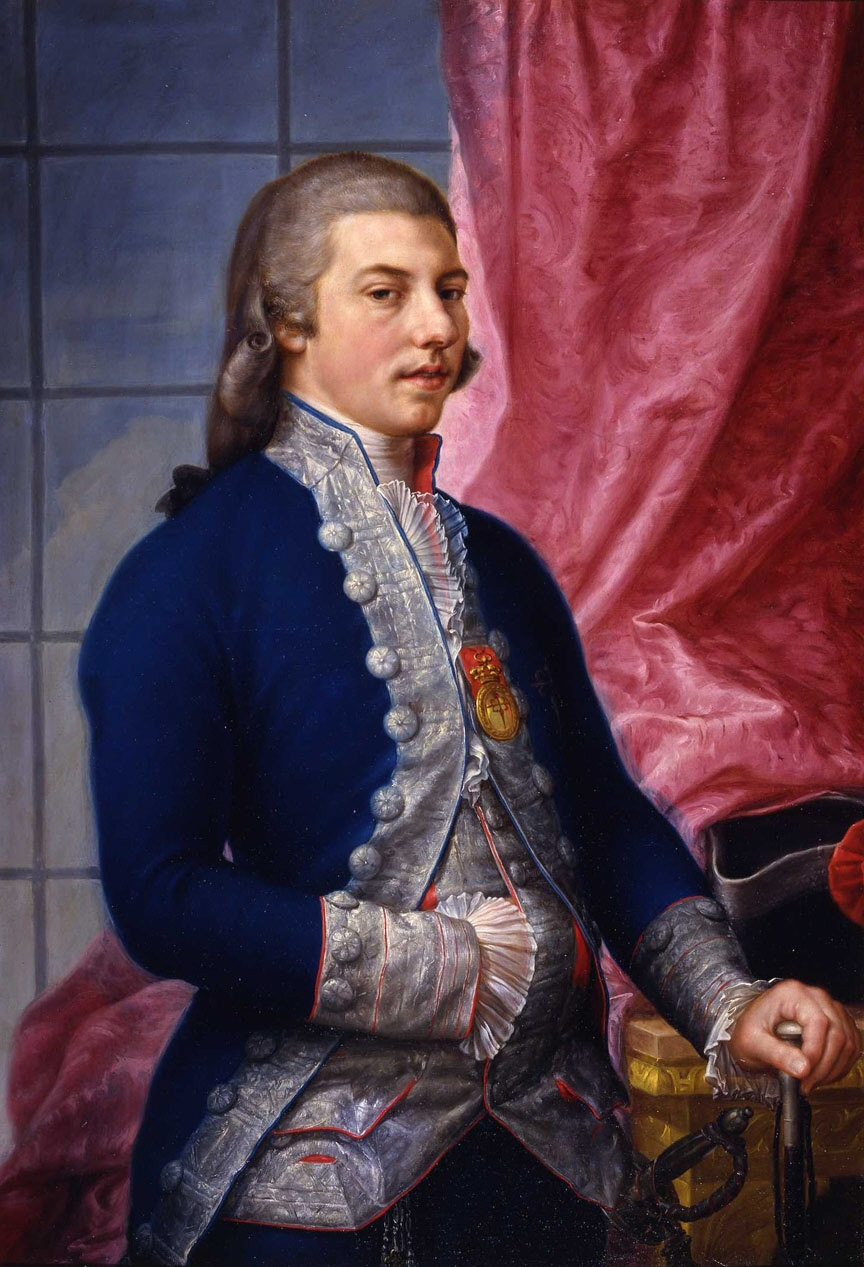
Manuel de Godoy, as pictured in a portrait by Francisco Bayeu in 1792

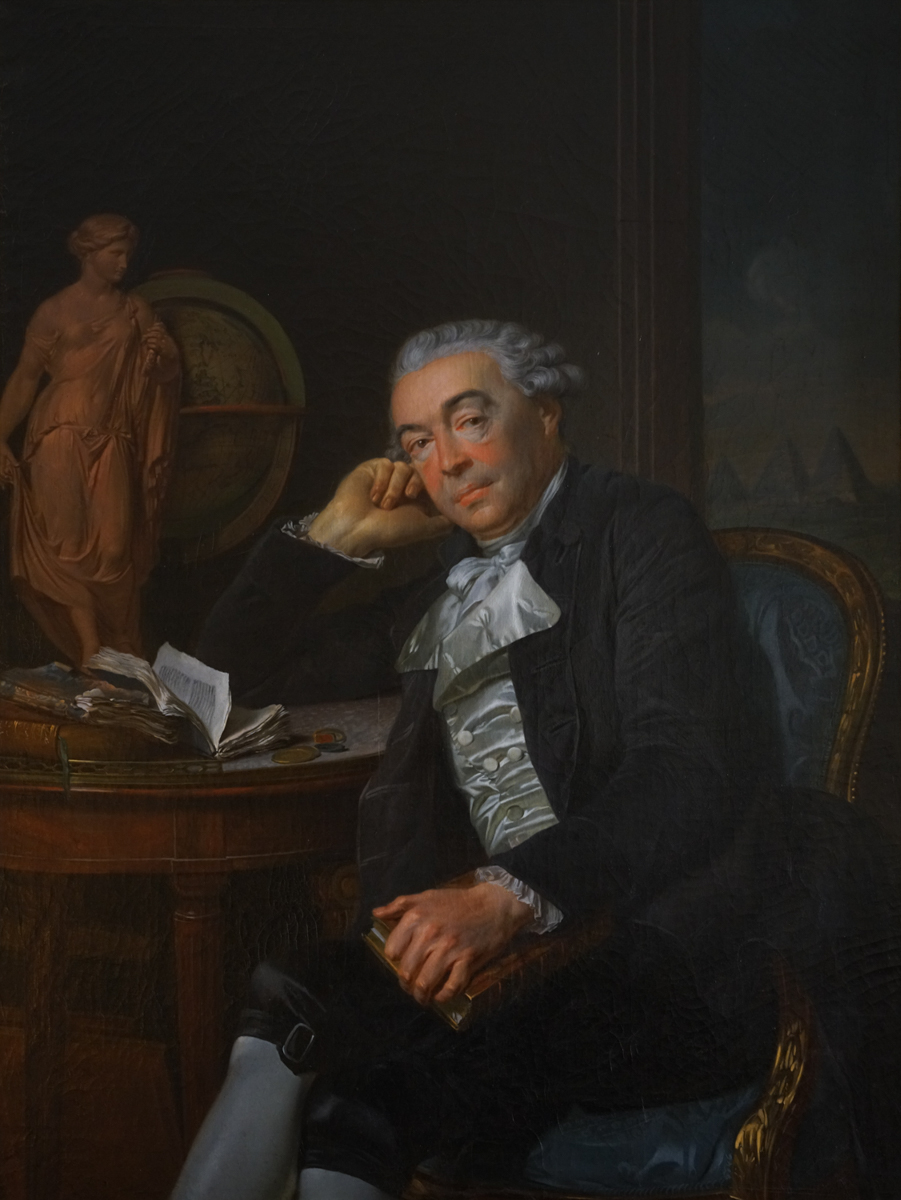
João Carlos de Bragança e Ligne (2nd Duke of Lafões, who was responsible for the defense of Portugal during the disaster of the War of the Oranges

On 29 January 1801, an ultimatum from Spain and France forced Portugal to decide between France and Britain, even as its government had tried to negotiate favorable relations with the two powers rather than abrogate the Treaty of Windsor (1386). The French sent a five-point statement to Lisbon demanding that Portugal:

- abandon its traditional alliance with the United Kingdom and close its ports to British shipping;
- open its ports to French and Spanish shipping;
- surrender one or more of its provinces, equal to one fourth part of her total area, as a guarantee for the recovery of Trinidad, Port Mahon (Menorca) and Malta;
- pay a war indemnity to France and Spain;
- review border limits with Spain.

If Portugal failed to accomplish the five conditions of this ultimatum, it would be invaded by Spain, supported by 15000 French soldiers. The British could not promise any effective relief, even as Prince John appealed to Hookham Frere, who arrived in November 1800. In February, the terms were delivered to the Prince-Regent; although he sent a negotiator to Madrid, war was declared. At the time, Portugal had a poorly trained army, with less than 8000 cavalry and 46000 infantry troops. Its military commander, João Carlos de Bragança e Ligne (2nd Duke of Lafões), had barely raised 2000 horse and 16000 troops. and was compelled to contract the services of a Prussian colonel, Count Karl Alexander von der Goltz, to assume command as field marshal. The Spanish Prime Minister and Commander-in-Chief, Manuel de Godoy, had some 30000 troops at his disposal, while the French troops under General Charles Leclerc (Napoleon's brother-in-law) arrived in Spain too late to assist Godoy, as it was a short military campaign.

On May 20, Godoy finally entered Portugal; this incursion was a precursor of the Peninsular War that would engulf the Iberian Peninsula. The Spanish army quickly penetrated the Alentejo region in southern Portugal and occupied Olivença, Juromenha, Arronches, Portalegre, Castelo de Vide, Barbacena and Ouguela without resistance. Campo Maior resisted for 18 days before falling to the Spanish army, but Elvas successfully resisted a siege by the invaders. An episode which occurred during the siege of Elvas accounts for the name, "War of the Oranges": Godoy, celebrating his first experience of generalship, plucked two oranges from a tree and immediately sent them to Queen Maria Luisa of Spain, mother of Carlota Joaquina and supposedly his lover, with the message:

I lack everything, but with nothing I will go to Lisbon.

— Manuel de Godoy

The conflict ended quickly when the defeated and demoralized Portuguese were forced to negotiate and accept the stipulations of the Treaty of Badajoz, signed on June 6, 1801. As part of the peace settlement, Portugal recovered all of the strongholds previously conquered by the Spanish, with the exception of Olivença and other territories on the eastern margin of the Guadiana, and a prohibition of contraband was enforced near the border between the two countries. The treaty was ratified by the Prince-Regent on 14 June, while the King of Spain promulgated the treaty on 21 June.

A special convention (i.e., the Treaty of Madrid) on 29 September 1801 made additions to that of Badajoz whereby Portugal was forced to pay France an indemnity of 20 million francs. This treaty was initially rejected by Napoleon, who wanted the partition of Portugal, but accepted once he concluded a peace with the United Kingdom at Amiens.

== Napoleonic invasions ==
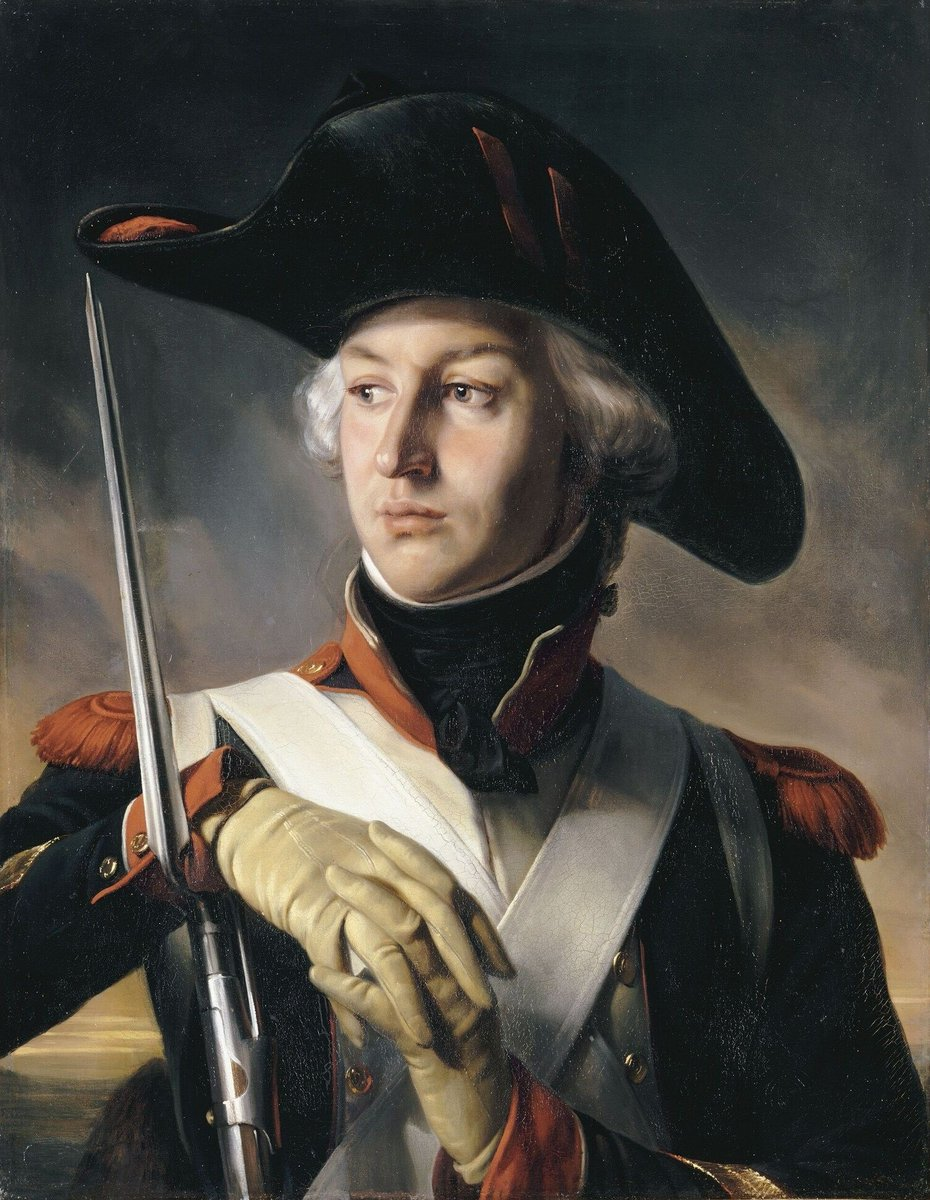
General Jean-Andoche Junot's forces crossed the border at the end of 1807, to conquer Portugal in order to partition it.

In 1806, after Napoleon's victory over the Prussians, he considered the problem of the resistance of the English, who had broken the peace in 1803 to challenge the Continental System imposed by the French, and realized that the situation in Portugal impeded his plan for reform in Europe. Again, Portuguese ports were ordered closed to British shipping;

On 27 October 1807, France and Spain signed the Treaty of Fontainebleau which would partition Portugal. In this pact, Northern Lusitania, a territory between the Minho and Douro rivers, would be a principality governed by the sovereign of the extinct Kingdom of Etruria (then Maria Luisa, daughter of Charles IV of Spain). The Algarve and all Portuguese territory located south of the Tagus would be governed by Manuel de Godoy, in compensation for his role in bringing the Spanish to align with France. The rest of Portugal, the area between the Douro and the Tagus, a strategic region because of its ports, would be administered by the central government in France until a general peace. Its colonial possessions, including Brazil, would be divided between Spain and France.

On either 19 or 20 November 1807, a French battalion commanded by General Jean-Andoche Junot entered Portugal. Napoleon had ordered its invasion and occupation.

On 27 November, the Prince Regent, the Queen and the entire royal family, accompanied by much of the nobility as well as their servants, boarded fifteen Portuguese ships gathered in the Tagus with an escort of several English ships, as planned the year before when the British ambassador advised the prince that the Portuguese Crown should be transferred to Brazil. Approximately 10000 people, including the entire governmental administration and the judiciary, joined the royal family as they moved to Brazil, a possession of Portugal, and established the capital of the Portuguese Empire in Rio de Janeiro.

=== First invasion ===
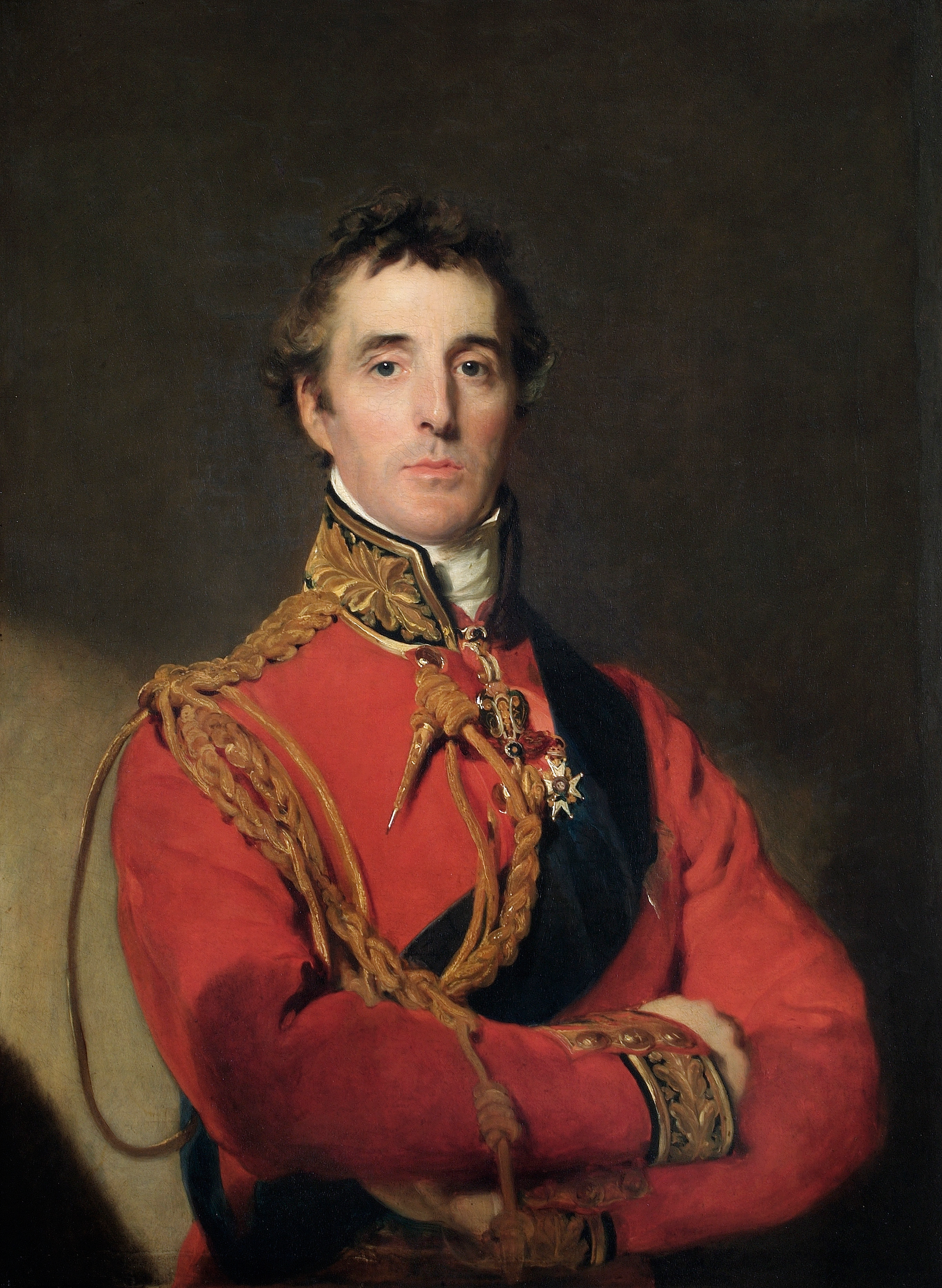
British General Arthur Wellesley disembarked in Galiza to support the Spanish, but was responsible for defeating Junot's forces.

General Jean-Andoche Junot and his troops had entered Spain on 18 October 1807 and crossed the Iberian Peninsula to reach the Portuguese border. Junot encountered no resistance and reached Abrantes by 24 November, Santarém on 28 November, and the Portuguese capital at the end of the month, arriving a day after the Court had fled to Brazil. Before the Prince Regent departed, he left orders with the Regency Junta to greet the French in peace. Once he arrived, Junot promoted himself as a reformer come to liberate the oppressed people of Portugal, promising progress, the construction of roads and canals, efficient administration, clean finances, assistance and schools for the poor. Instead, he set about removing vestiges of the Portuguese monarchy, declared that the House of Braganza had ceased to reign in Portugal, suspended the Council of Regency, suppressed the Portuguese militia, billeted officers in the finest houses of the rich, and plundered the Portuguese treasury for continuing reparations to the French. Meanwhile, 50000 Spanish and French troops roamed the countryside arresting, killing, plundering and raping the citizenry.

By 1808, as Junot was busy redesigning Portuguese society, Napoleon decided to revise his alliance with Spain; he forced the abdication of Charles IV of Spain and his son Ferdinand, and installed his brother Joseph Bonaparte as King. A popular uprising in Spain immediately spread to Junot's forces, which were accompanied by Spanish troops, and further instigated a popular uprising by the Portuguese that was brutally put down after some minor successes.

The following year, a British force commanded by Arthur Wellesley (future Duke of Wellington) disembarked in Galiza with the intent of supporting the Spanish, but later advanced on Porto and landed at Figueira da Foz on 1 August. The British-Portuguese forces advanced quickly on the French, defeating them at the Battle of Roliça (17 August) and later the Battle of Vimeiro (21 August). A two-day armistice was observed as negotiations proceeded and the belligerents formally signed the Convention of Sintra (30 August), without Portuguese representation. As part of the accord, the British transported the French troops to France, with the product of sacks made in Portugal. The Convention benefited both sides: Junot's armies, incapable of communicating with France, could make a safe withdrawal; and the Anglo-Portuguese forces gained control over Lisbon. The Portuguese populace was free to avenge itself on francophile compatriots for the brutality and depredations of the French.

=== Second invasion ===
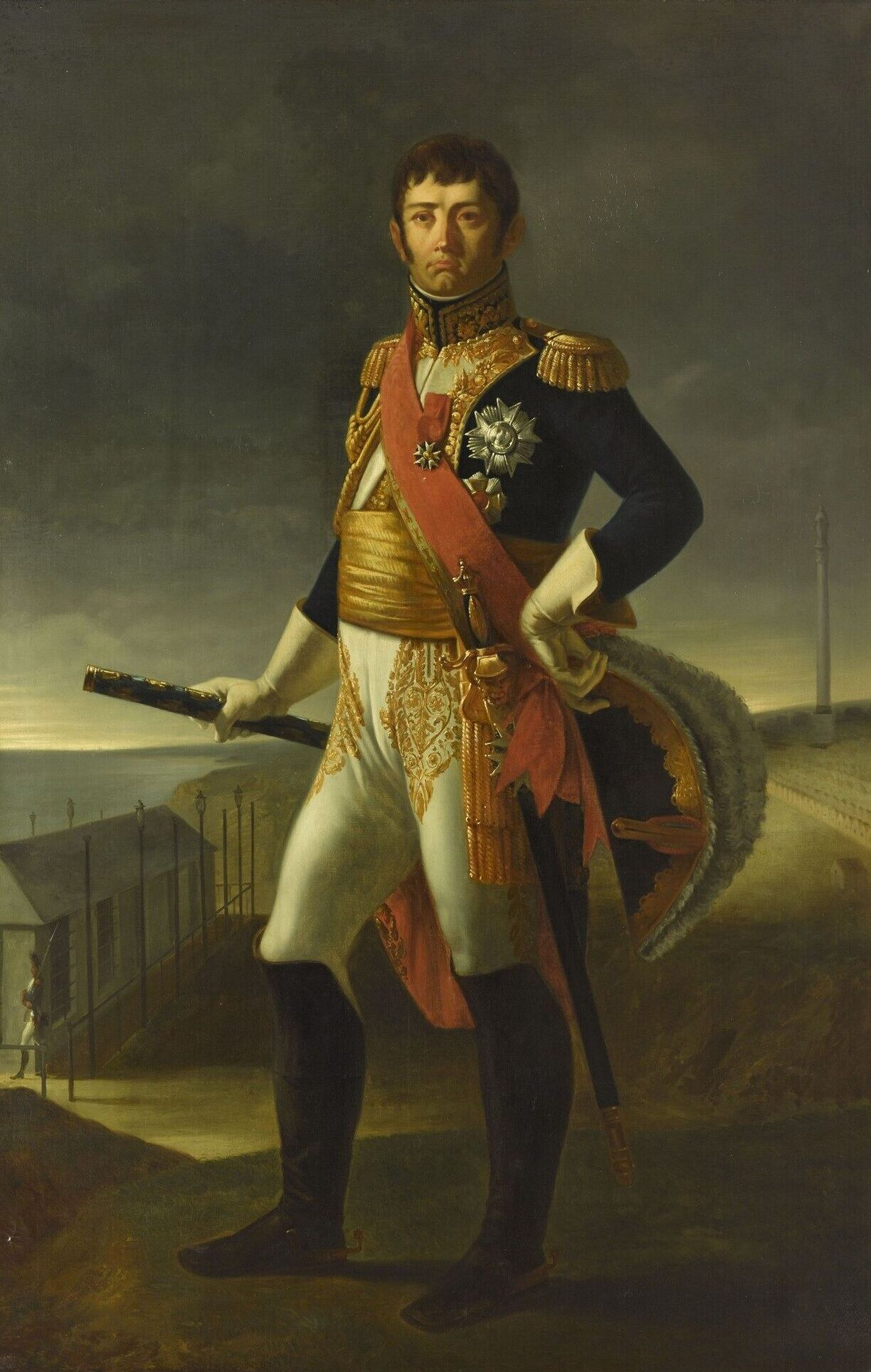
Jean-de-Dieu Soult

As Napoleon began dealing with the Spanish in earnest, he sent Marshal Jean-de-Dieu Soult to reoccupy Portugal. As word spread of the abdication of the Spanish royal family, many Spaniards revolted, gaining support from the British stationed in Portugal. Under the command of John Moore, British forces crossed the northern Portuguese border but were defeated at A Coruña by Marshal Soult, and were forced to retreat in the middle of January. The French immediately occupied northern Portugal and advanced on Porto by 24 March.

Unlike the first invasion, there was a popular revolt against French occupation by farmers, conservative nobility and the poor. Many of the citizen soldiers and farmers fought against the French aggression, going so far as to see tactical retreats as a betrayal or treason by the Portuguese officers.

But Soult occupied Chaves on 12 March, a defense of Braga was unsuccessful and the French troops stormed and captured Porto by 29 March. Soult forces encountered a popular resistance in Porto, that included militia and local residents who barricaded the streets. But Francisco da Silveira recovered Chaves and ultimately, it was Wellesley, again, at the head of the British-Portuguese forces who expelled the French from the north of the country. He was aided by William Carr Beresford and supported by a stronger Portuguese contingent, trained, equipped and commanded by British officers. The Anglo-Portuguese Army defeated Soult at the Second Battle of Porto, re-conquering the city of Porto on 29 May, and forcing the French retreat to Galicia. Wellesley intended to pursue the French, but with French forces crossing from the Spanish Extremadura, he moved his base to Abrantes. From here his forces then marched up the Tagus valley, entered Spain and won the victory at Talavera, after which he was made Duke of Wellington. He could not penetrate further, owing to Soult's forces joining Victor, to bar the way to Madrid, and so withdrew to Torres Vedras to plan for the defense against a third invasion by the French.

Meanwhile, in the Portuguese colony of Brazil, Portugal was successful in capturing French Guiana in 1809.

=== Third invasion ===
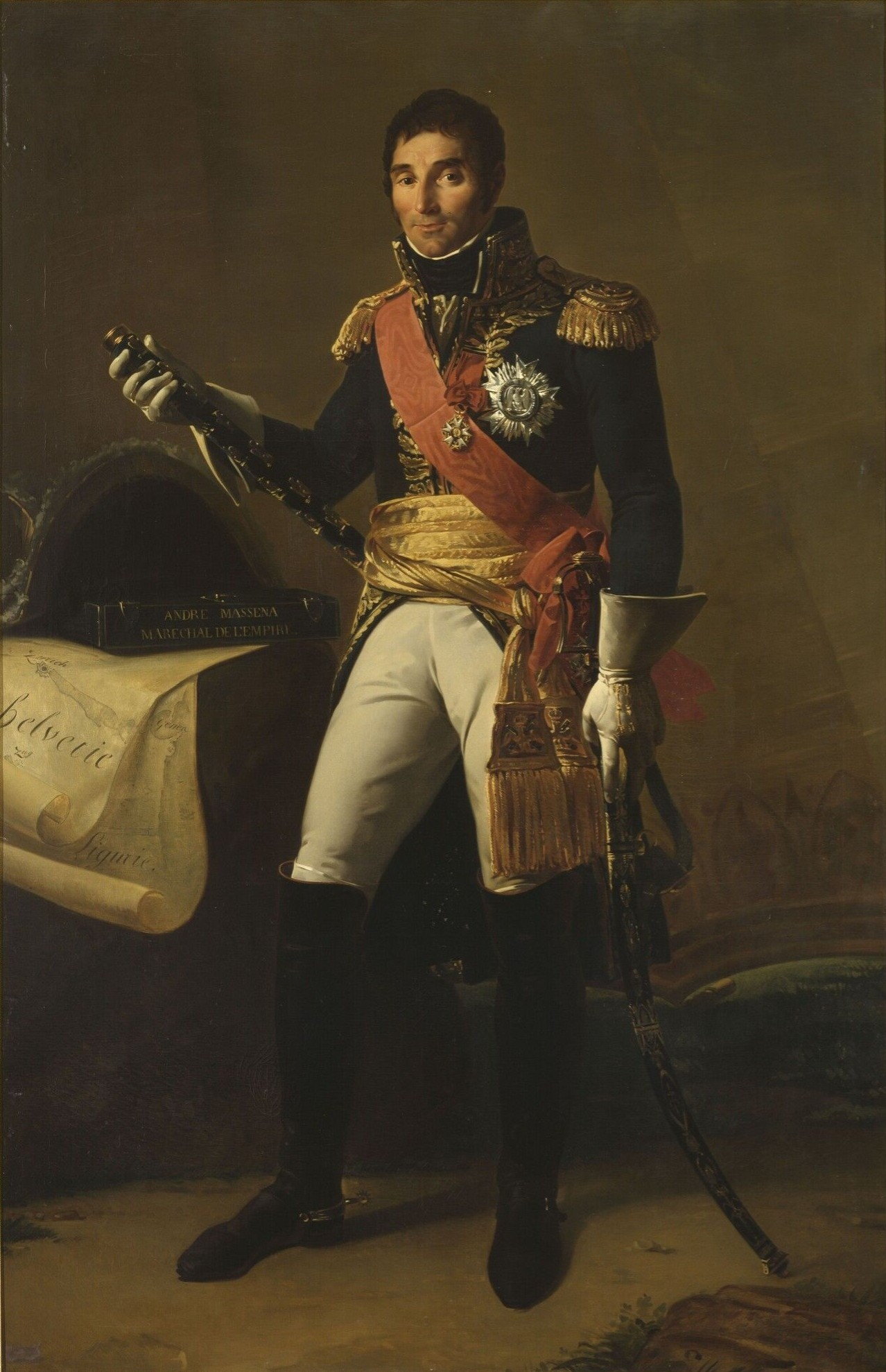
André Masséna

The third invasion, the last effort of the Peninsular War on Portuguese soil, was commanded by Marshal André Massena, and divided into three parts under Jean Reynier, Claude Victor-Perrin and Jean-Andoche Junot, and comprised 62000 men and 84 canon. Entering by way of Beira in August, they quickly defeated the defenders in the Fort of Almeida in August, then marched in the direction of Lisbon. Against the wishes of his council, Messena attacked the Anglo-Portuguese Army on 26 September in Buçaco, losing 4,500 troops. Yet, Wellesley's forces withdrew in front of the oncoming French, until his troops entered the prepared positions in Torres Vedras.

But the French were impeded along the Lines of Torres Vedras, a system of 152 fortifications north of Lisbon, planned by Wellington, supervised by Lieutenant-Colonel Richard Fletcher constructed by Portuguese laborers, manned by 40000 Portuguese troops and members of the local population. Marshal Massena and his forces reached the lines by 14 October, but were unable to penetrate the defenses, and he was forced to retreat in April 1811. Supplies were running low, and Massena sent a request to Bonaparte for new instructions, but was compelled to withdraw before the instructions arrived, and he retreated to Santarém. Although Napoleon finally sent Soult, it was too late for Massena, who could not hold Santarém and withdrew towards Coimbra by March 6. Successively, the French were defeated in several smaller battles: the Battle of Sabugal, Fuentes de Onoro, Battle of Condeixa, Battle of Casal Novo, and the Battle of Foz de Arouce, in addition to Michel Ney's rear-guard action at the Battle of Pombal. With winter quickly approaching, his forces starving, they were again defeated at the Battle of Redinha and with Anglo-Portuguese forces in pursuit, Massena crossed the border into Spain; the War would continue until March 1814, but not on Portuguese territory.

A series of battles in Spain followed, until a final victory was reached on French soil in the Battle of Toulouse on April 10, 1814, putting an end to the Peninsular War. However, in numerous coastal, interior and border towns there were bodies bayoneted and left on the ground; several frontier towns were pillaged and ransacked for treasure or vandalized by retreating troops (both British and French); reprisal killings were common in the local populations for sympathizers (the total number of casualties in the war reached 100000 by one account); while famine and social deprivation was common.

Furthermore, the instability in Spain and the abdication of the king, resulted in declarations of independence in the Spanish colonies of America, which in turn was responsible for a tense political climate in Brazil.

In 1816, and as a result of the increasing influence of the Liga Federal, the United Kingdom of Portugal, Brazil and the Algarves invaded and conquered the Banda Oriental, annexing it under the name of Província Cisplatina in 1821.

== Liberal Revolution ==
Flag of the United Kingdom of Portugal, Brazil and the Algarves (1816–1826)

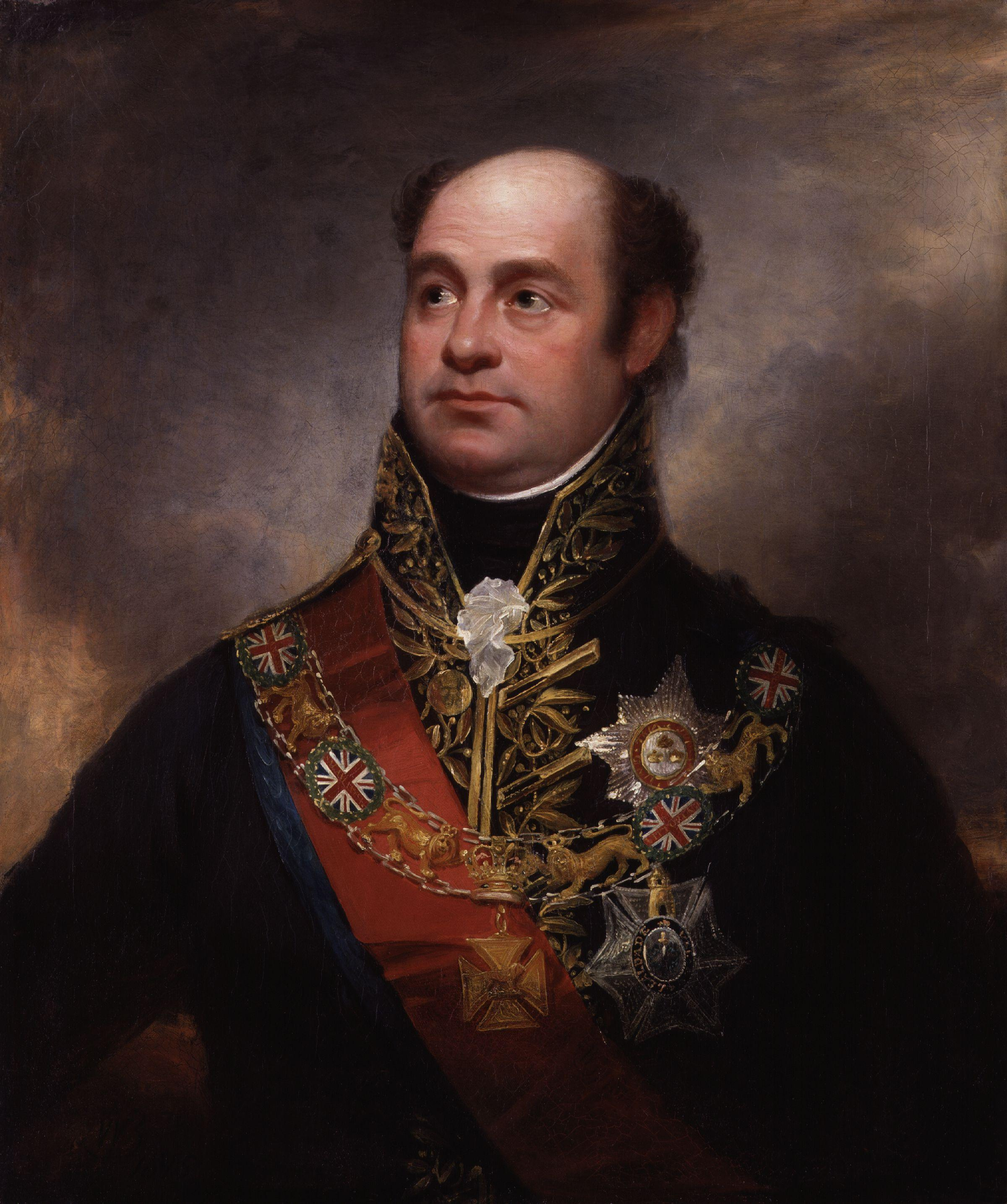
William Carr Beresford, who administered mainland Portugal during the post-Peninsular War period

From 1808 through 1821, Portugal was effectively both a British protectorate and a colony of Brazil, as the Portuguese Crown remained in Rio de Janeiro. The moving of the Portuguese capital to Rio de Janeiro accentuated the economic, institutional and social crises in mainland Portugal, which was administered by English commercial and military interests under William Beresford's rule in the absence of the monarch. The influence of liberal ideals was strengthened by the aftermath of the war, the continuing impact of the American and French revolutions, discontent under absolutist government, and the general indifference shown by the Portuguese regency for the plight of its people.

After 1807 the limitations and subordinations inherent in Brazil's colonial status were already being reduced incrementally. The prohibition on transformative industries was rescinded, and new incentives were offered for: the creation of factories, the importation of British machinery, ship construction, and road building, as well as the foundation and construction of public schools and military academies. In addition to these improvements, the Bank of Brazil was chartered and insurance companies, commerce commissions and currency exchanges were established. This damaged the mother country's commercial interests and aggravated social problems there, while benefiting the United Kingdom, as Portugal was governed by the increasingly despotic British general William Beresford in the absence of the Cortes.

At the end of the Peninsular War, Portugal returned French Guiana (which had been seized in 1809) to France on 30 May 1814. With the declaration by King John of the United Kingdom of Portugal, Brazil and the Algarves in December 1815, Brazil's new importance worsened the situation in continental Portugal: politically, it became the Portuguese capital (shedding the pretense of being a colony), and economically, was now able to trade directly with other European powers.

=== 1820 Revolution ===
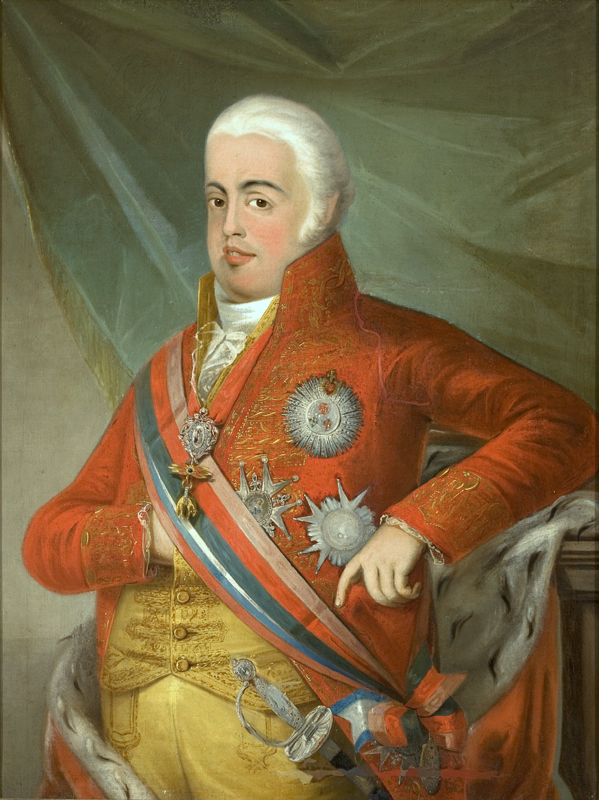
The Prince-Regent, who would become King John VI of Portugal, was not interested in returning to mainland Portugal immediately after the Peninsular War

A report was sent from the Regency to John VI on 2 June 1820, stating:

"Portugal has arrived at a crisis in which it will suffer a revolution of fortunes, of order, an anarchy, and other ills that will bring a complete reduction of public credit...".

Portugal's neighbor Spain, during its resistance to the Napoleonic invasions, had approved a liberal Constitution when King Ferdinand VII was in exile, but it was quickly abrogated on his return, and he reigned as absolute monarch. The Spanish model also served as an example for the Portuguese: a popular uprising in the provinces against absolutism forced the Spanish monarch to reinstate the 1820 Constitutional monarchy.

The significance of events in Spain was not lost on a small group of politically like-minded bourgeoisie in Porto; two years earlier, Manuel Fernandes Tomás, José Ferreira Borges, José da Silva Carvalho and João Ferreira Viana had founded the Sinédrio, a clandestine liberal group who debated the political evolution of Spain and Portugal and would influence subsequent events. The Sinédrio's members were a mixture of merchants, property-owners, the military and noblemen, whose liberalism was based not on personal economic circumstances but on their exposure to international literature and philosophies at university or in the masonic lodges. The common people were rural, almost totally illiterate and lived in a culture of tradition and religion guided by the clergy. The ideological differences between the doctrinairism of the liberal movement and the dogmas of religion would bring the two groups into conflict eventually. In the meantime, however, the rhetoric of the liberal intellectuals had influenced those soldiers in the northern garrisons who on 24 August 1820, first proclaimed in Porto a revolution against the absolute monarchy of Portugal. A colonel read out the declaration:

"Let's join our brothers-in-arms to organize a provisional government that will call on the Cortes to draw-up a Constitution, whose absence is the origin of all our ills."

The Regency in Lisbon attempted to gather forces to oppose the revolt, but on 15 September they too joined the movement.

The administration of William Beresford was swiftly replaced by a Provisional Junta, and the "General Extraordinary and Constituent Cortes of the Portuguese Nation", whose deputies were chosen by indirect election, was summoned on 1 January 1821 to draft a written Constitution. This constitutional assembly was composed of diplomatic functionaries, merchants, agrarian burghers, and university-educated representatives who were usually lawyers. Most of all these were ideological romantics, later referred to as Vintistas for their audacious radicalism. State censorship of the press and literary productions was lifted, and the Portuguese Inquisition was extinguished; a general amnesty for those involved in anti-liberal movements was also ordered. On 26 April 1821, John VI departed for Lisbon, arriving on 3 July of the same year, and communicated to the Cortes the establishment of a Regency in Brazil in the name of his heir-apparent, Pedro I of Brazil. The deputies did not recognize the King's authority to designate regents, nor support the Bragança Agreement, which stipulated that the Portuguese Crown should pass to Prince Pedro if Brazil gained its independence.

=== Empire of Brazil ===
Flag of the independent Empire of Brazil, under Peter I

Talk of separatism had dominated the economic and intellectual circles of Brazil, which was prosperous, although at least one third of its population of 3.5 million were African slaves. The question was whether Brazil should return to being a colony of Portugal or the reverse should be the case. While most Portuguese-born Brazilians believed in a united empire, the majority of natives and local politicians aspired to some form of independence for their homeland. The historical evidence indicates that regardless of any developments in Portuguese politics, Brazil would have proclaimed independence after the return of King John VI to Portugal. The separatist movement rose from the conflict between the Regency of Prince Pedro meant to rule frugally and started by cutting his own salary, centralizing scattered government offices and selling off most of the royal horses and mules. He issued decrees eliminating the royal salt tax to spur the output of hides and dried beef; he forbade arbitrary seizure of private property; required a judge's warrant for arrests of freemen; and banned secret trials, torture, and other indignities. He also sent elected deputies to the Portuguese Cortes. Slaves continued to be bought and sold and disciplined with force, however, despite his assertion that their blood was the same color as his and the Portuguese Cortes.

In September 1821, the Portuguese Cortes, with a handful of the Brazilian delegates present, voted to abolish the Kingdom of Brazil and the royal agencies in Rio de Janeiro, thus subordinating all provinces of Brazil directly to Lisbon. Troops were sent to Brazil to stifle resistance, and local units were placed under Portuguese command. On 29 September, the Cortes ordered Prince Pedro to return to Europe to complete his education with a tour of Spain, France and England, but the governmental junta in São Paulo, as well as the Senate Chamber of Rio de Janeiro implored the prince to remain. He was moved by petitions from Brazilian towns and fears that his departure, with the consequent dismantling of the central government, would trigger separatist movements.

Pedro formed a new government headed by José Bonifácio de Andrade e Silva, a former royal official and professor of science at the University of Coimbra who was a formative figure in Brazilian nationalism, and known as the "Patriarch of Independence". Following Prince Pedro's decision to defy the Cortes, Portuguese troops rioted, then concentrated in the area of Mount Castello, which was soon surrounded by thousands of armed Brazilians. Pedro dismissed the Portuguese commanding general, General Jorge Avilez, and ordered him to remove his soldiers across the bay to Niterói, where they would await transportation to Portugal. Blood was also shed in Recife, province of Pernambuco, when the Portuguese garrison was forced to depart in November 1821. In mid-February 1822, Brazilians in Bahia revolted against the Portuguese forces there, but were driven into the countryside, where they began guerrilla operations, signaling that the struggle in the north would not be without loss of life and property.

Hoping to rally support throughout the country, Pedro began a series of initiatives to strengthen his position, even as the Portuguese Cortes ridiculed him and disparaged his importance. In Minas Gerais, where there were no Portuguese garrisons stationed, some doubts lingered, especially among the junta of Ouro Preto. With only a few companions and no pomp or ceremony, Pedro plunged into Minas Gerais on horseback in late March 1822, receiving enthusiastic welcomes and vows of allegiance everywhere. On 13 May, in Rio de Janeiro, Pedro was proclaimed the "Perpetual Defender of Brazil" by the São Paulo legislative assembly and he took the opportunity to call for a constituent assembly. To broaden his base of support, he joined the freemasons, who, led by José Bonifácio de Andrade e Silva, were pressing for parliamentary government and independence. More confident now, in early August he called on the Brazilian deputies in Lisbon to return, decreed that Portuguese forces in Brazil should be treated as enemies, and issued a manifesto to "friendly nations" that read like a declaration of independence. Seeking to duplicate his triumph in Minas Gerais, Pedro rode to São Paulo in August to ensure his support there.

Returning from an excursion to Santos, Pedro received messages from his wife Princess Maria Leopoldina and Andrade e Silva that the Portuguese Cortes had declared his government traitorous, and were dispatching more troops. Pedro then had to choose between returning to Portugal in disgrace, or breaking the last ties to Portugal; in a famous scene in front of the Ipiranga River on 7 September 1822, he tore the Portuguese white and blue insignia from his uniform, drew his sword, and swore: "By my blood, by my honor, and by God: I will make Brazil free." With this oath, repeated by the assembled crowd, he announced: "Brazilians, from this day forward our motto will be...Independence or Death"

== Absolutism ==
John VI had no pretensions to the throne until his older brother Joseph, Prince of Beira, died from smallpox at the age of 27. John, then 21 years old, lived for hunting and had little interest in public affairs. However, four years later he became prince regent because of Queen Maria I's mental illness, and in 1816, he became King John VI after her death while the royal family was residing in Rio de Janeiro. In 1821 he was forced to return to a country economically and politically unstable, to preside over a recently installed constitutional monarchy. There were deep divisions between the returning Royal Court and the Portuguese Cortes that governed the nation. While the free-thinking Vintistas of the upper class governed, the new "modern era" was such in name only: the former condition of the poor still prevailed, they remaining pro-monarchist and ultra-religious, but without the power to change their circumstances.

=== Vilafrancada ===
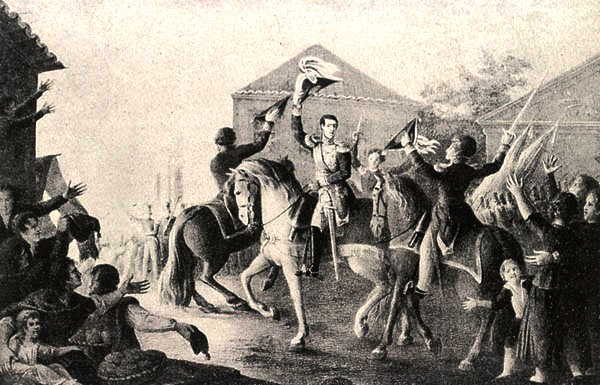
Vilafrancada: Prince Miguel being acclaimed in Vila Franca de Xira

The situation in continental Europe changed in 1823. Once again influenced by events in Spain, where the anti-liberal Santa Aliança had restored the absolute monarchy, pro-monarchist forces gravitated towards Queen Carlota Joaquina de Borbón. The queen was very conservative, ambitious and violent, and at the same time despised her husband's politics, manners and personality. While in Brazil, she had attempted to obtain administration of Spanish dominions in Latin America and was involved in various obscure conspiracies regarding the independence of Brazil. The return of the king and the royal court had emboldened the clergy and nobles who were hostile to the Constitution and parliamentary government.

Prince Miguel, who shared the queen's views, served as her instrument to subvert the revolution. On 27 May 1823, the prince organized an insurgency against the liberal constitution; a garrison from Lisbon joined Miguel in Vila Franca de Xira, and there absolutism was proclaimed. The king responded by suspending the 1822 Constitution and promising the promulgation of a new law to guarantee "personal security, property and jobs". The revolt was referred to as the Vilafrancada (events that occurred in Vila Franca). One of the objectives of Queen Carlota and Miguel was the abdication of King John, who, although he accepted absolutism, was yet loyal to the liberal Constitution. Ultimately the king accepted absolutism when a movement of army officers and citizens surrounded the Palace of Bemposta to urge him to renounce liberal ideals.

=== Abrilada ===
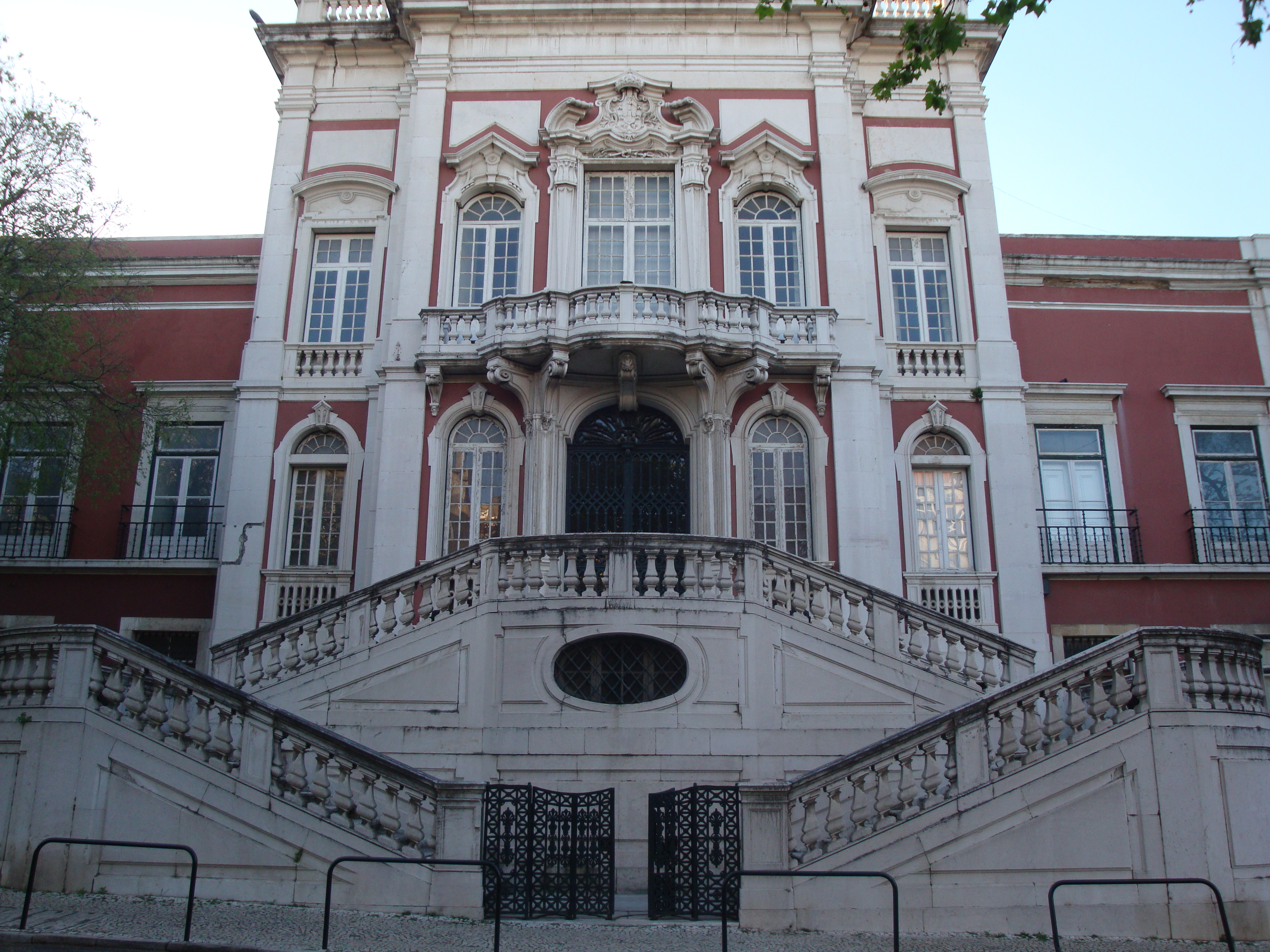
Bemposta Palace (residence of King John VI): where the monarch was held incommunicado during the Abrilada

In Portugal, as in Spain, the adversaries of constitutionalism were divided into two factions: a radical and a more moderate group. King John depended on the moderate faction; the ministers he selected after the Vilafrancada oscillated between conciliatory paternal absolutism and a timidly moderate liberalism. Queen Carlota was the principal supporter of the radical absolutists, who favored absolutism without concessions and the repression of new ideas filtering in from Europe. She gave no quarter, and in 1823, the police revealed a conspiracy led by her and Prince Miguel (who had been promoted to the post of commander-in-chief of the Army following the events of the Vilafrancada) to force the King to abdicate. Then, on 30 April, Miguel, using the pretext that the King's life was in danger, imprisoned numerous ministers and important figures of the kingdom, while keeping his father incommunicado in the Bemposta Palace. This second attempt to depose King John became known as the Abrilada, (after "Abril", the Portuguese word for "April"). During the course of his actions Miguel had offended the sensibilities of the British and French ambassadors, who managed to get John to the British battleship Windsor Castle in Caxias. There he was made aware of the situation, summoned Miguel, dismissed him from the post of commander-in-chief of the army, and sent him into exile. On 14 May, John returned to the Palace of Bemposta and re-established the liberal government. However, a new conspiracy was discovered on October 26 of the same year. The queen accused the liberals of attempting to poison the king, while they suspected her of having done it herself: this time, she was exiled to Queluz.

During his reign as king, John promoted the arts (mainly literature), commerce and agriculture, but being forced to return to Europe and to keep track of the court intrigues that arose following the independence of Brazil made him an unhappy man, and he died soon after the Abrilada in 1826. It was also at the end of his life that he recognized the independence of Brazil (15 November 1825) and restored his son Pedro's right of succession to the Portuguese throne. Before his death, he named a regency council presided over by the Infanta Isabel Maria to govern the country between his death and the acclamation of the future king.

== To Civil War ==
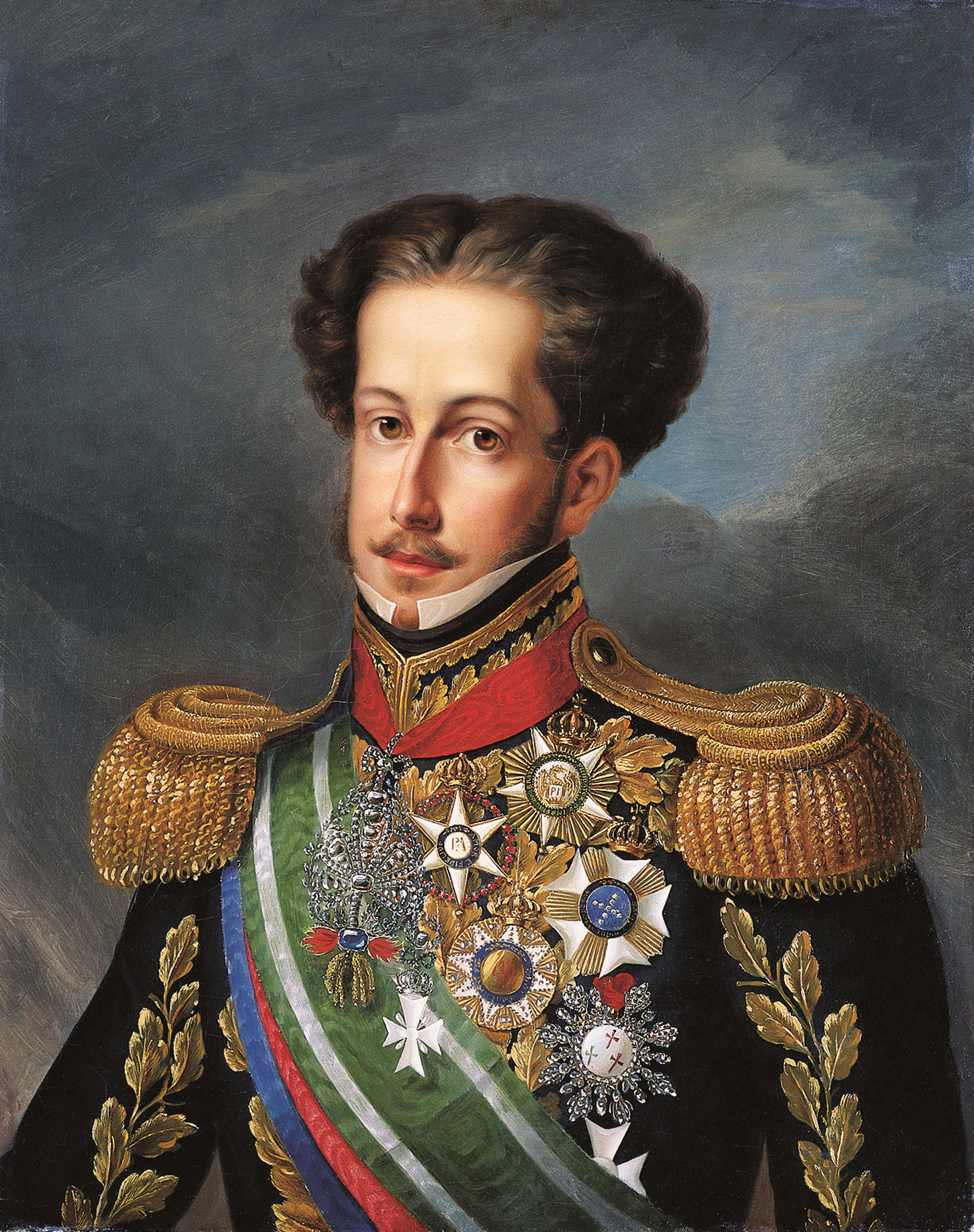
Emperor Pedro I of Brazil, established the 1826 Portuguese Constitution, considered by some to be too pragmatic for the time

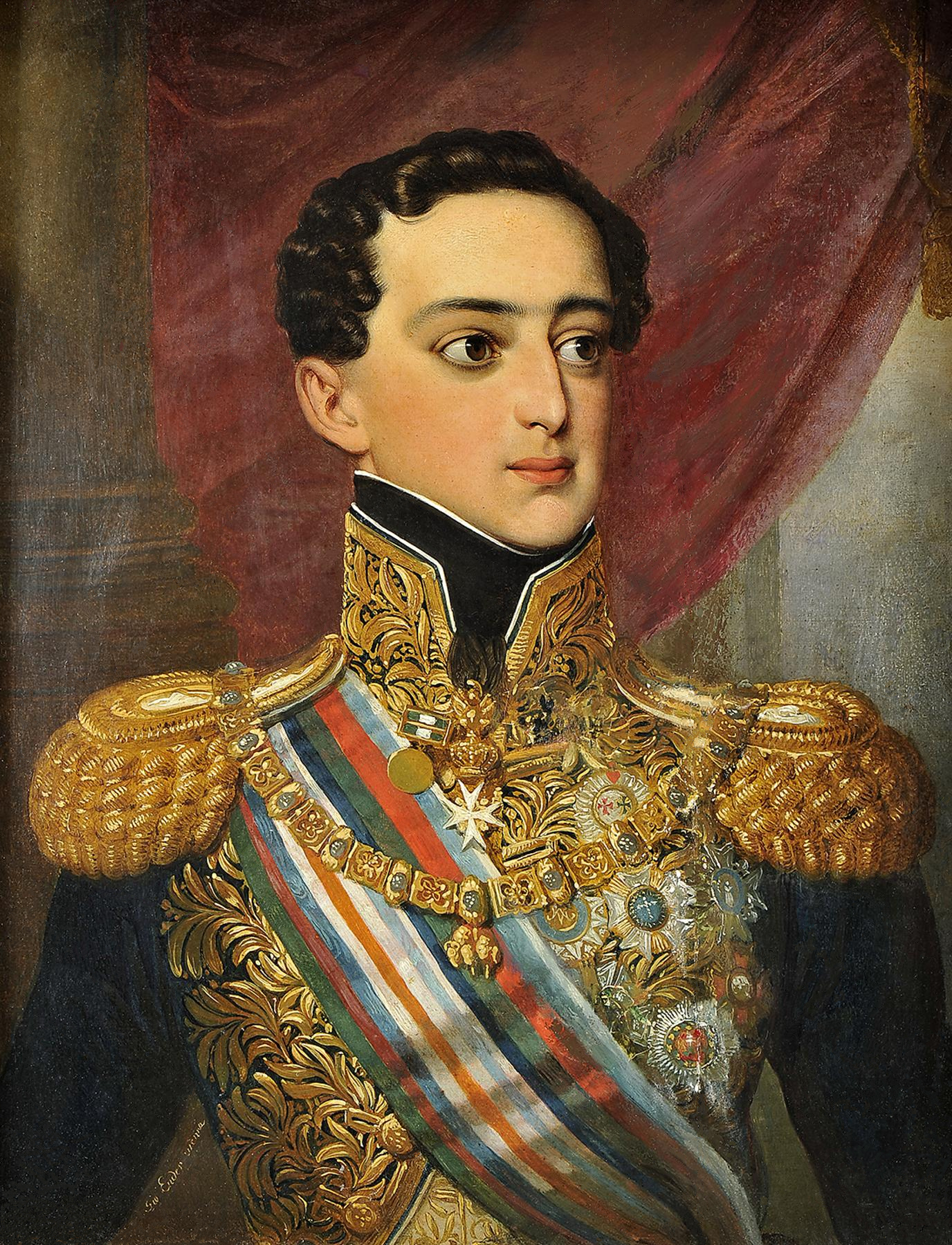
Prince Miguel reclaimed the throne that was rightfully his, as his brother had lost his rights to it, and as such could not legally pass them over to his niece

The death of King John VI sparked a constitutional crisis, as his rightful successor, Prince Pedro, was the Emperor of Brazil. To absolutists, the proclamation of Brazilian independence created a foreign nation, thus revoking Pedro's citizenship and his right of succession to the throne. John had left his daughter Princess Isabel Maria as regent. Prince Miguel was also an undesirable option for the liberals; he had been exiled due to several attempts he made to overthrow his own father, and supported the traditionalist politics of his mother, Queen Carlota, whom most of the liberals and moderates feared. Pedro accepted the throne of Portugal as King Pedro IV on 10 March 1826, after the regency deemed him the legitimate heir to the throne and sent a delegation to offer him the crown.

In Brazil, Pedro faced other challenges to his newborn country; the people clearly did not wish to return to colonial status and subservience to the politics and economy of the much smaller kingdom of Portugal. The Brazilian constitution prohibited the Emperor from subsuming another crown; this fact obliged Pedro to choose between Portugal or Brazil. Pedro, a pragmatic politician, tried to find a solution that would reconcile the desires of the liberal, moderate and absolutist elements in the debate, and eventually chose to abdicate as king of Portugal (28 May 1826) in favor of his eldest daughter Princess Maria da Glória, who was seven years old at the time. The abdication was conditional: Portugal should receive a new Constitution, i.e., the 1826 Charter, and his brother Miguel, exiled in Vienna, was to marry the Princess when she came of age. The Constitution was not popular with the absolutists (who wanted Prince Miguel to govern as an absolute monarch), but the liberal Vintistas also did not support the Charter (which was imposed by the King); moderates bided their time as a counter-revolution was slowly building.

=== Acclamation of Miguel I as King ===
In 1828, Prince Miguel returned from Austria, becoming Pedro's lieutenant and replacing their sister Princess Isabel Maria, who was ill, as regent. Over the next few months, traditional nobility, clergymen and the vast majority of the population (who were supporters of D. Miguel) proclaimed Miguel King of Portugal. They also annulled the liberal Constitution, persecuted liberals and their supporters, and attempted to obtain international support for their regime. Thousands of liberal idealists were killed, arrested, or forced to flee to Spain, England, the Azores and Brazil. The acclamation was followed by demonstrations in support of absolutism and failed revolutions to reinstate liberalism.

The sequence of events inevitably triggered the Liberal Wars between the supporters of absolutism, led by Miguel, and those of liberalism. Miguel tried to obtain international support for his cause, but failed due to British pressure, although the United States and Mexico did recognize his authority. Between 1828 and 1834, forces loyal to progressive liberalism battled the power of Miguel's absolute monarchy. A liberal uprising in Porto led by exiles Pedro de Sousa Holstein (later 1st Duke of Palmela), João Carlos Saldanha de Oliveira Daun (later 1st Duke of Saldanha) and António José Severim de Noronha (later Duke of Terceira), was quickly defeated by Miguel's forces while similar revolts in the Azores and Madeira were similarly defeated (the liberal forces were able to hold onto territory only in Terceira).

=== Portuguese Civil War ===
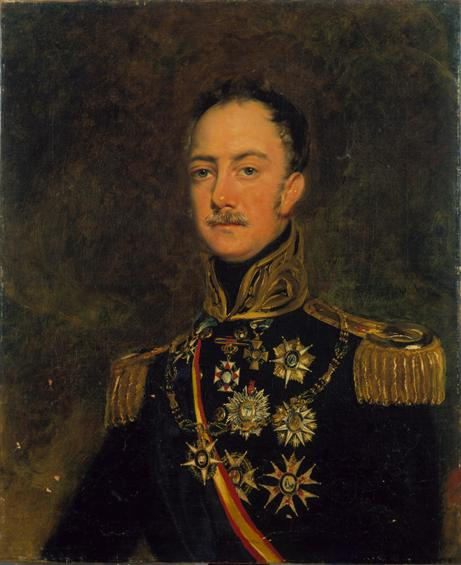
António José Severim de Noronha, leader of the liberal government-in-exile, responsible for the defense of Porto, and later the defeat of Miguelist forces in Lisbon

The political climate began to change in 1830. Popular opposition to Pedro's reign in the aftermath of the dismissal of several of his ministers during a growing economic crisis forced him to abdicate his throne in Brazil in favor of his son, Pedro II, on 7 April 1831. He then returned to Europe, but found little support from England or France for his quest to regain the throne; instead, he collected arms, money and mercenaries to install his daughter on the throne. He then departed for Terceira in the Azores, from where his government-in-exile organized an expeditionary force that disembarked in Mindelo, not far from Porto, on 8 July 1832.

With the backing of liberals from Spain and England, and substantial foreign mercenary contingents (who comprised roughly 80% of the liberal forces), Pedro landed near Porto, which the Miguelist forces abandoned without combat. After fighting the inconclusive Battle of Ponte Ferreira, Miguelite forces besieged Porto, engaging in sporadic skirmishes. Throughout the year, most of the battles of the Civil War concentrated around Porto, whose population had whole-heartedly supported the liberal cause. In June 1833, the liberals, still encircled at Porto, sent out a force commanded by the Duke of Terceira to Algarve, supported by a naval squadron commanded by Charles Napier, using the alias Carlos de Ponza. The Duke of Terceira landed in Faro and marched north through Alentejo to conquer Lisbon on 24 July 1833. Meanwhile, Napier's squadron encountered the absolutist fleet near Cape Saint Vincent and decisively defeated it at the Battle of Cape St. Vincent.

The liberals were able to occupy Lisbon, making it possible for them to repel the Miguelite siege in Porto. A stalemate of nine months ensued. Towards the end of 1833, Maria da Glória was proclaimed Queen regnant, and Pedro was made regent. His first act was to confiscate the property of all who had supported Miguel. He also suppressed all religious orders and confiscated their property, an act that suspended friendly relations with the Papal States for nearly eight years, until mid-1841. The liberals occupied Portugal's major cities, Lisbon and Porto, where they commanded a sizable following among the middle classes.

Meanwhile, the absolutists controlled the rural areas, where they were supported by the aristocracy and the peasantry. Operations against the Miguelists recommenced in early 1834, and they were defeated at the Battle of Asseiceira. The Miguelite army, however, was still a force (about 18,000 men) to be reckoned with, but on May 24, 1834, at the Concession of Evoramonte, peace was declared under a convention by which Miguel formally consented to renounce all claims to the throne of Portugal, was guaranteed an annual pension, and was banished from Portugal, never to return. Pedro restored the Constitutional Charter and died soon after, on 24 September 1834, while his daughter assumed the throne as Maria II of Portugal

== See also ==
- Kingdom of Northern Lusitania, proposed by Napoleon
- Timeline of Portuguese history
