= Vintism =

Vintists Vintistas
- Founded: 24 August 1820
- Dissolved: 27 April 1823
- Succeeded by: Septemberist Party
- Headquarters: Lisbon
- Ideology: Royalism; Constitutionalism; Liberalism
- Political position: Left

Vintism (Portuguese: Vintismo, from vinte, "twenty", as in eighteen-twenty) is a term used to refer to the political movement that dominated Portugal between 1820 and 1823, characterised by the radicalism of liberal ideas and the preponderance of the Constituent Cortes. It gave birth to the Portuguese Constitution of 1822.

The Vintist political stances were advanced for their time and mobilized the liberal left for most of the rest of the 19th century. They demanded the end of absolute monarchy and the return of King John VI from Brazil, from where he had been ruling the country since Napoleonic forces had invaded Lisbon in 1807; they appealed to the King to work together with the social forces represented in Parliament.

The Vintist movement started after the revolution of 24 August 1820 that swiftly replaced the protectorate of William Beresford with a Provisional Junta and Constituent Assembly composed of diplomatic functionaries, merchants, agrarian burghers, and university-educated representatives who were usually lawyers. Vintism ended with the Vilafrancada on 27 May 1823, a military uprising led by Prince Miguel that led to the abolishment of the 1822 Constitution and the reestablishment of absolute monarchy.

== See also ==
- History of Portugal (1777–1834)
