= Siege of Almeida (1762) =

1762 siege of the Seven Years' War

Coordinates: 40.7260°N 6.9061°W

- Part of the Spanish invasion of Portugal
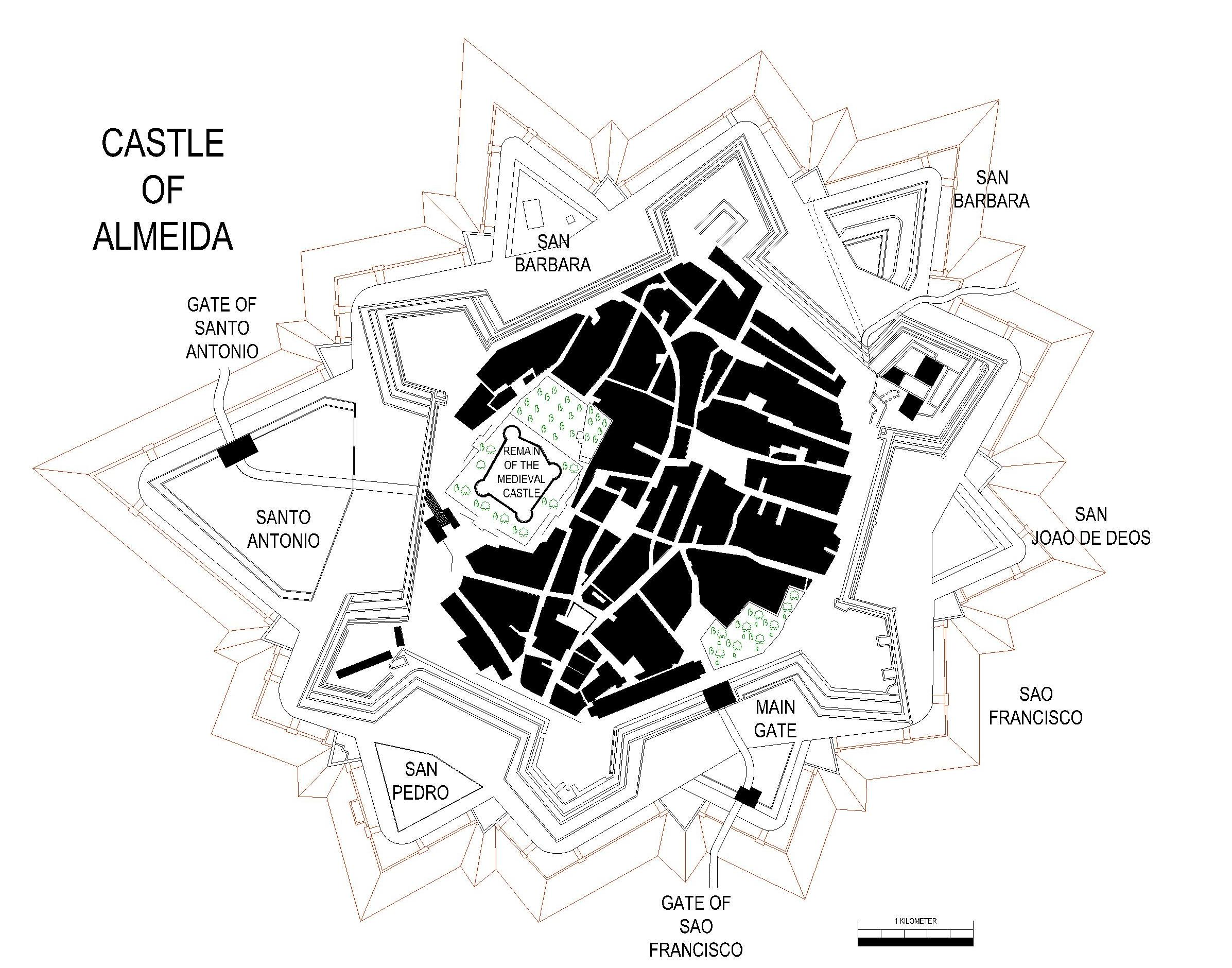
- The layout of the Fortress of Almeida
Date	August 1762
Location	Almeida, Portugal
Result	Spanish victory

Belligerents
Spain	Portugal

Commanders and leaders
Pedro de Bolea	Alexandre Palhares

Strength
32,000	1,500

Casualties and losses
Unknown	Unknown

invasion of Portugal (1762)
Portuguese victory
Spanish victory
1 Battle of the Douro 25 May 1762
2 Battle of Montalegre 26 May 1762
3 Siege of Almeida August 1762
4 Battle of Valencia de Alcántara 27 Aug 1762
5 Alvito Shock (3 October 1762)
6 Battle of Vila Velha (5 October 1762)
7 Battle of Marvão (9–10 November 1762)
8 Battle of Ouguela (19 November 1762)

The siege of Almeida took place in August 1762 when a Spanish force besieged and captured the city of Almeida from its Portuguese defenders during the Seven Years' War. The city was taken on 25 August as part of the invasion of Portugal by a Spanish army commanded by the Count of Aranda.

The force that captured Almeida was part of a major Franco-Spanish offensive to overrun Portugal. A northern pincer invaded Portugal from Galicia crossing the Douro and threatening Porto while the southern force crossed the border from Ciudad Rodrigo and proceeded towards the major Portuguese fortification of Almeida. Fernando Vélaz de Medrano y Bracamonte, 4th Marquess of Tabuérniga, became a key figure in the siege of Almeida, where he blockaded, sieged, and captured Almeida.
It was captured after a nine-day siege, but a further Spanish advance was stalled by the arrival of 8,000 British troops - and their disruption of Spanish supplies at the Battle of Valencia de Alcántara.

Almeida was garrisoned by Aranda, but it remained the only major fortress in Spanish hands by the close of the war. It was returned to the Portuguese following the Treaty of Paris in exchange for the return of Havana and Manila to Spain by the British.

== See also ==
- Great Britain in the Seven Years War
- Spanish invasion of Portugal (1762)

== Bibliography ==
- Brown, Peter Douglas. William Pitt, Earl of Chatham: The Great Commoner. George Allen & Unwin, 1978.
- Dull, Jonathan R. The French Navy and the Seven Years' War. University of Nebraska, 2005.
- Jaques, Tony. Dictionary of Battles and Sieges. Greenwood Press, 2007.
- Petrie, Sir Charles. King Charles III of Spain. Constable, 1971.
