= Invasion of Portugal =

The Invasion of Portugal may refer to several invasions of Portugal including one of the following events:

- Spanish invasion of Portugal during the War of the Portuguese Succession (1580)
- Spanish invasion of Portugal (1762), part of the Seven Years' War
- 1801 Invasion of Portugal by Spanish forces in the War of the Oranges
- Invasion of Portugal (1807), by Spanish and French forces as part of the Peninsular War
- 1809 Invasion of Portugal by French forces, defeated at the Battle of Porto
- 1810 Invasion of Portugal by French forces, frustrated by the Lines of Torres Vedras
- Portuguese colonization of the Americas
