= Siege of Almeida =

The siege of Almeida may refer to one of a number of historical events including:

- Siege of Almeida (1762), during the Seven Years' War
- Siege of Almeida (1810), during the Peninsular War
- Siege of Almeida (1811), during the Peninsular War
