= Battle of Vila Velha =

1762 battle of the Seven Years' War

- Part of the Spanish invasion of Portugal
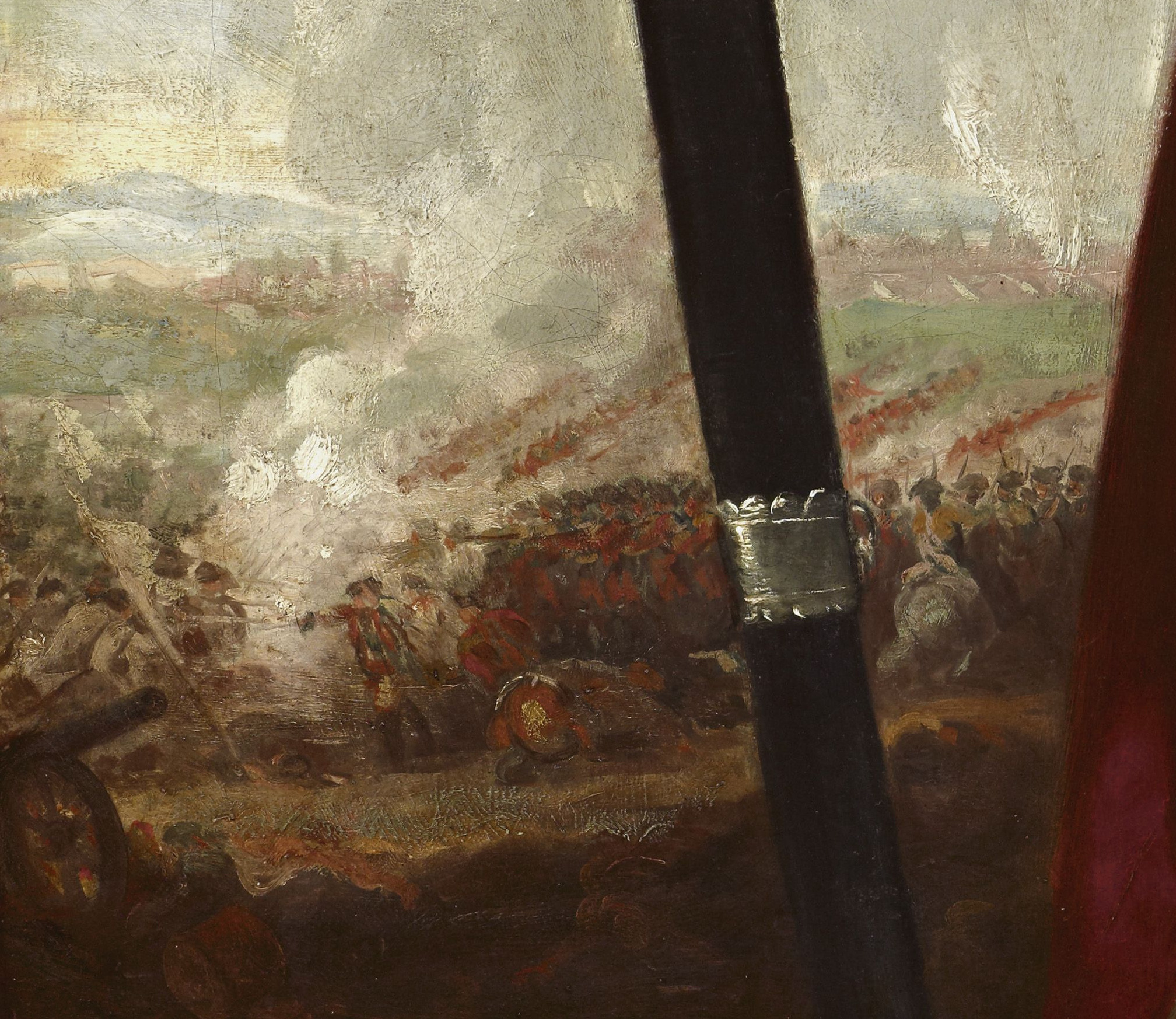
- Possible depiction of the battle in Portrait of John Burgoyne (1766)
| Date | 5 October 1762 |
| Location | Vila Velha de Ródão, Portugal 39.6500°N 7.6700°W |
| Result | Anglo-Portuguese victory |

Belligerents
| Great Britain; Portugal | Spain |

Commanders and leaders
| (Kingdom of Great Britain) John Burgoyne (Kingdom of Great Britain) Charles Lee | (Spain) Unknown |

Strength
| 200 line infantry 50 dragoons (Great Britain) 100 grenadiers (Portugal) | 200 grenadiers 100 cavalry 8 guns |

Casualties and losses
| 1 killed 10 wounded | 100 killed or wounded 150 captured 6 guns captured 60 mules captured |

The Battle of Vila Velha or Battle of Vila Velha de Ródão took place in October 1762 when a British-Portuguese force led by John Burgoyne and Charles Lee surprised and recaptured the town of Vila Velha de Ródão, Portugal, from Spanish invaders during the Seven Years' War as part of the Spanish invasion. Burgoyne, who took the Spanish base at Valencia de Alcántara, Portugal, two months earlier then marched against forces preparing to cross the River Tagus into Alentejo.

== Events ==
=== Background ===
On 3 October 1762 Count of Lippe anticipated a Spanish offensive across the Zêzere River against the Portuguese headquarters at Abrantes. He instructed George Townshend to march to the Beira Baixa country, hugging the left bank of the Zêzere river, to rendezvous with Lord George Lennox's forces. The goal was to threaten the Spanish lines of communication with Almeida and Ciudad Rodrigo by advancing on Belmonte and Penamacor.

The march was promptly executed, causing Townshend's Portuguese soldiers the greatest privations, but his men successfully attacked a French force escorting a convoy near Sabugal, capturing many supplies.

=== Surprise attack ===
The same day, the Spanish force, which had taken Vila Velha on the 2nd, advanced on Porto Cabrão, leaving behind eight artillery pieces guarded by 200 grenadiers and 100 horses. General Burgoyne, who was in charge of the defence of the south bank of the Tagus in this area, noticed that only a small force was guarding the Spanish battery at Vila Velha and ordered lieutenant-colonel Charles Lee to take the head of a detachment (100 Portuguese grenadiers, 200 men of the 85th Foot and 50 men of the 16th Light Dragoons), to pass the Tagus and to attack this position. A Portuguese grenadier of the 2nd Cascais Infantry courageously crossed the Tagus with a rope to facilitate the passage of a barge, sacrificing his life in the action.

On 7 October, Lee launched a surprise night attack and surprised the Spanish camp at Vila Velha. Although the British and Portuguese were entrenched, surprise helped them to overpower and disperse the Spanish horse and foot, inflicting considerable loss. Some 250 Spanish were killed, wounded, or captured, and 6 guns and 60 artillery mules were taken. Lee's primary target, however, was the artillery depot, which was mostly burned, some of it being seized. This was achieved at a cost of only 1 man killed and 10 wounded. The town was held as Portuguese and British reinforcements arrived the next day. The taking of Vila Velha effectively ended the Spanish and French invasion campaign

=== Aftermath ===
By the middle of October, the Franco-Spanish army decided to retreat into Spain with Lippe and Townshend pursuing them. The Spanish were forced to leave their sick behind, and by 24 October, the Spanish and French armies were back in Spain. A few skirmishes along the border as both sides went into Winter quarters. Still, the Spanish would try once more in November at Olivença Marvão and Ouguela, but they were repelled. On 22 November, the Spanish commander Count of Aranda proposed a truce to Lippe, and thus the campaign concluded.

== See also ==
- Great Britain in the Seven Years' War

== Bibliography ==
- Jaques, Tony. Dictionary of Battles and Sieges. Greenwood Press, 2007
- Kirby, Mike, The Portuguese Army - Seven Years' War, Seven Years' War Association Journal, Vol. XII No. 3
- Pereira Sales, Ernesto Augusto; O Conde de Lippe em Portugal, Vila Nova de Famalicao: Publicacoes da Comissao de Historia Militar, 1936, pp. 55–62
- McHugh, Don, and Mike Kirby, The Portugal Campaign 1762 - France and Spain Invade, Seven Years' War Association Journal Vol. XII No.
- Howson, Gerald. Burgoyne of Saratoga, Times Press, 1979
