= Nicolás de Carvajal, Marquis of Sarria =

Spanish general and noble (1696–1770)

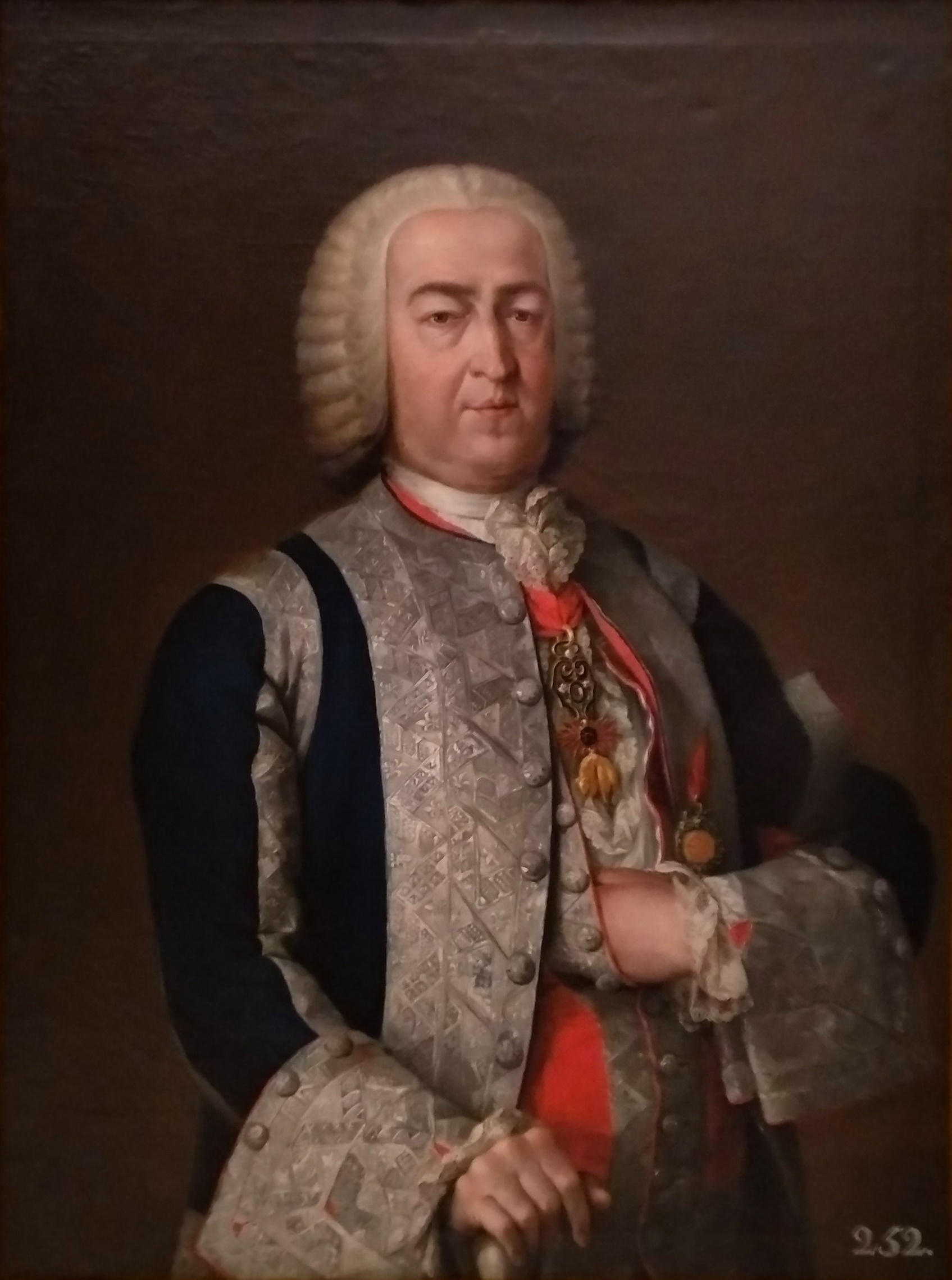
Portrait by Bernardo Martínez del Barranco, c. 1762

Nicolás de Carvajal y Lancaster, Marquis of Sarria (28 October 1696, in Cáceres – 4 March 1770, in Madrid) was a member of the Spanish nobility and military figure in the 18th century.

== Biography ==
He was the son of Bernardino de Carvajal y Vivero (second Count de la Quinta de la Enjarada), and Maria Josefa de Lancaster y Noroña. His mother was a descendant of Jorge de Lancastre, a natural son of King John II of Portugal. His brothers were José de Carvajal y Lancáster (Spanish Prime Minister between 1746 and 1754) and Juan Carvajal y Lancaster (4th Duke of Abrantes).

He was lieutenant general, and colonel of the Spanish infantry regiment of the Reales Guardias. King Ferdinand VI made him a Grandee of Spain first class in 1755.

In 1762 he became commander of the Spanish invasion of Portugal, but he was very slow in assembling his troops and commencing hostilities. This gave the British the time to bring over an expeditionary force in support of the weak Portuguese army. King Charles III was disgusted by Sarria's lethargy and had him replaced by the Count of Aranda. Sarria received the order of the Golden Fleece, as compensation, and as a reward for his earlier services to the Crown.

He married Ana María Josefa López de Zúñiga y Castro (Marquesa de Sarriá), a daughter of Juan Manuel de Zúñiga (11th Duke of Béjar) and Rafaela de Castro y Centurión, and widow of Ginés Miguel Fernando Ruíz de Castro y Portugal (11th count of Lemos).

He died in Madrid without an heir on 4 March 1770.

== Sources ==
- Vida de Carlos III. Tomo II p3 (in Spanish)
- Grandes de España
- Geneall.net
