= Spanish invasion of Portugal (1762) =

Major campaign of the Seven Years' War

- Part of the Fantastic War and the Anglo-Spanish War (1762–1763)
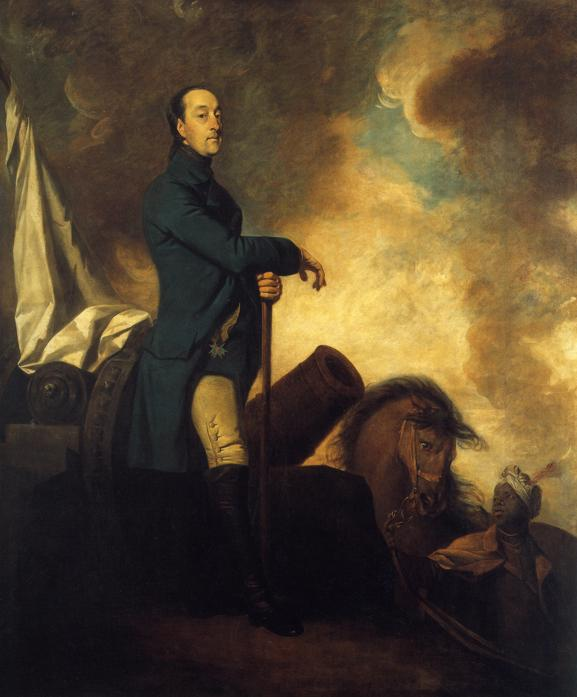
- William, Count of Schaumburg-Lippe, generalissimus of the Anglo-Portuguese forces that thrice defeated the Spanish and French offensives against Portugal. Painting by Joshua Reynolds.
Date	5 May – 24 November 1762
Location	North and East Portugal, Spain
Result	Anglo-Portuguese victory: Invasion thrice defeated; Destruction of the Spanish and French forces

Belligerents
Portugal; Great Britain	Spain; France

Commanders and leaders
Count of Lippe; Brás de Carvalho; Count of Santiago; Earl of Loudoun; George Townshend; John Burgoyne	Count of Aranda; Marquis of Sarria; Alejandro O'Reilly; Prince de Beauvau

Strength
8,000 Portuguese; 7,104 British (6 infantry regiments, 1 dragoon regiment and 8 artillery companies)	30,000–40,000 Spaniards; 94 cannons; 10,000–12,000 French (12 battalions); Total: 42,000–52,000 (largest Franco-Spanish military mobilisation of the eighteenth century)

Casualties and losses
Very low: (14 British soldiers killed in combat, 804 by disease or accidents; Portuguese losses low)	25,000–30,000 dead, (Note: from starvation, disease, combat, and desertion) thousands wounded, or captured

invasion of Portugal (1762)
Portuguese victory
Spanish victory
1 Battle of the Douro 25 May 1762
2 Battle of Montalegre 26 May 1762
3 Siege of Almeida August 1762
4 Battle of Valencia de Alcántara 27 Aug 1762
5 Alvito Shock (3 October 1762)
6 Battle of Vila Velha (5 October 1762)
7 Battle of Marvão (9–10 November 1762)
8 Battle of Ouguela (19 November 1762)

The Spanish invasion of Portugal between 5 May and 24 November 1762, was a military episode in the wider Fantastic War in which Spain and France were defeated by the Anglo-Portuguese Alliance with broad popular resistance. It involved at first the forces of Spain and Portugal until France and Great Britain intervened in the conflict on the side of their respective allies. The war was also strongly marked by guerrilla warfare in the mountainous country, which cut off supplies from Spain, and a hostile peasantry, which enforced a scorched earth policy as the invading armies approached that left the invaders starving and short of military supplies and forced them to retreat with heavy losses, mostly from starvation, disease, and desertion.

During the first invasion, 22,000 Spaniards commanded by Nicolás de Carvajal, Marquis of Sarria, entered the Province of Alto Trás-os-Montes, in the northeast of Portugal, with Porto their ultimate goal. After occupying some fortresses they were confronted with a national uprising. Taking advantage of the mountainous terrain, the guerrilla bands inflicted heavy losses on the invaders and practically cut off their communication lines with Spain, causing a shortage of essential supplies. Near starvation, the Spaniards tried to conquer Porto quickly but were defeated in the Battle of Douro and the Battle of Montalegre before they retreated to Spain. After that failure, the Spanish commander was replaced by Pedro Pablo Abarca de Bolea, Count of Aranda.

Meanwhile, 7,104 British troops landed in Lisbon, leading a massive reorganization of the Portuguese army under Wilhelm, Count of Schaumburg-Lippe, the supreme commander-in-chief of the allies.

During the second invasion of Portugal (Province of Beira), an army of 42,000 French and Spanish soldiers under Aranda took Almeida and several other strongholds, and the Anglo-Portuguese army stopped another Spanish invasion of Portugal by the province of Alentejo and won the Battle of Valencia de Alcántara (Spanish Extremadura), where a third Spanish corps was assembling for an invasion.

The allies managed to stop the invading army in the mountains east of Abrantes, where the slope of the heights facing the Franco-Spanish army was abrupt but very soft on the side of the allies, which facilitated the supply and movements of the allies but acted as a barrier for the Franco-Spaniards. The Anglo-Portuguese also prevented the invaders from crossing the river Tagus and defeated them at the Battle of Vila Velha.

The Franco-Spanish army (which had their supply lines from Spain cut off by the guerrillas) was virtually destroyed by a deadly scorched earth strategy. Peasants abandoned all nearby villages and took with them or destroyed the crops, food and all else that could be used by the invaders, including the roads and houses. The Portuguese government also encouraged desertion among the invaders by offering large sums to all deserters and defectors. The invaders had to choose between stay and starve or withdraw. The outcome was the disintegration of the Franco-Spanish army, which was compelled to retreat to Castelo Branco, closer to the frontier, when a Portuguese force under Townshend made an encircling movement towards its rearguard. According to a report sent to London by the British ambassador in Portugal, Edward Hay, the invaders suffered 30,000 losses, almost three-quarters of the original army, mainly caused by starvation, desertion and capture during the chase of the Franco-Spanish remnants by the Anglo-Portuguese army and peasantry.

Finally, the allies took the Spanish headquarters, Castelo Branco, capturing a large number of Spaniards, wounded and sick, who had been abandoned by Aranda when he fled to Spain, after a second allied encircling movement.

During the third invasion of Portugal, the Spaniards attacked Marvão and Ouguela but were defeated with casualties. The allies left their winter quarters and chased the retreating Spaniards. They took some prisoners, and a Portuguese corps entered Spain took more prisoners at La Codosera.

On 24 November, Aranda asked for a truce which was accepted and signed by Lippe on 1 December 1762.

== Overview ==
The 1762 Bourbon invasion of Portugal was actually a succession of three military campaigns in different places and times with similar results:

"The first object of the allied governments of Spain and France was to invade Portugal, the ancient ally of Great Britain, which was supposed to be wholly incapable of defending itself against so formidable a confederacy...that feeble and defenceless kingdom was invaded shortly afterwards at three distinct points by three Spanish armies, such was the spirit of patriotism awaked among the peasantry by a few British officers, that the invaders were repulsed, and ultimately driven back in disgrace."

— Studies in history

== Background ==
=== Portuguese and Spanish neutrality in the Seven Years' War ===
During the Seven Years' War, a British fleet under Admiral Boscawen defeated a French fleet in Portuguese waters in front of Lagos, Algarve, in 1759. Three French ships of the line were captured and two were destroyed. Portugal, though an old ally of Britain, had stated her neutrality in this war and accordingly, the Portuguese prime minister Pombal demanded satisfaction from Great Britain. The British government apologized to the Portuguese king, José I, by sending a special delegation to Lisbon, yet the captured vessels were not returned, as demanded by France (Pombal had previously informed Pitt that he did not expect it). The Portuguese government materially assisted the French garrisons that had taken refuge in Lagos after the battle. The French king, Louis XV, thanked José I for all the assistance given to the French sailors, although claiming for the navies. The case seemed settled, but Spain and France would use it as a pretext to invade Portugal four years later.

Portugal was having increasing difficulties in maintaining its neutrality in the Seven Years' War because of outbreaks of minor incidents between British and French: on one occasion, the British consul in Faro instructed British frigates to enter the city's harbour and prevent a French warship from unloading; and in Viana do Minho, British businessmen armed themselves and boarded a boat, recapturing a captured British merchant ship from a French corsair. Despite these incidents, the king and government of Portugal were strongly committed to keep the country out of the war.

On their part, the French were pressuring a reluctant Spain to enter the war on their side (while beginning secret negotiations with Great Britain to end it). Both countries eventually signed the third Family Compact (15 August 1761), a "continental system" mainly designed to isolate Britain in Europe. However, British ships intercepted official correspondence from Spain to France and learned that there was a secret clause providing that Spain should declare war on Britain on 1 May 1762. The British anticipated Spain, declaring war first on 2 January 1762.

=== The Franco-Spanish Ultimatum ===
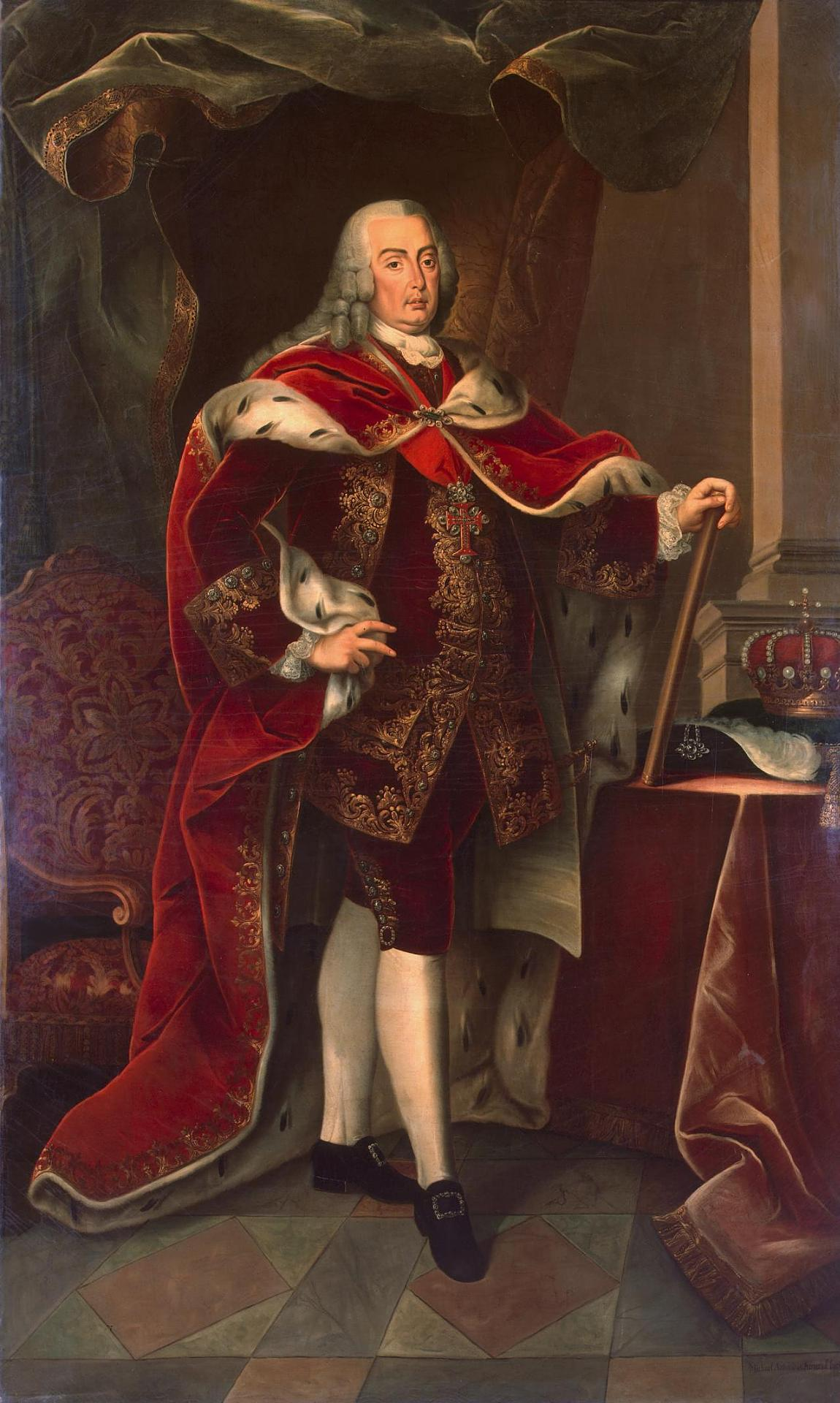
Joseph I of Portugal. Confronted with the Franco-Spanish "ultimatum" of 1762 to betray his alliance with Britain, he said "it would affect him less, though reduced to the last extremity, to let the last tile of his palace fall, and to see his faithful subjects spill the last drop of their blood, than to sacrifice, together with the honour of his crown, all that Portugal holds most dear..."

Both Bourbon powers decided to force Portugal to join their Family Compact (the Portuguese king was married to a Bourbon, the Spanish king Charles's sister). Spain and France sent an ultimatum to Lisbon (1 April 1762) stating that Portugal had to:

- Terminate the Anglo-Portuguese Alliance replacing it with a new alliance with France and Spain.
- Close her ports to British ships and to interrupt all commerce with Great Britain both in Europe and within the Portuguese empire.
- Declare war on Great Britain
- Accept the occupation of Portuguese ports (including Lisbon and Porto) by a Spanish army. Thus Portugal would be both "protected" and "liberated" from its British "oppressors".

Portugal was given four days to answer, after which the country would face an invasion by the forces of France and Spain. Both Bourbon powers hoped to benefit by diverting British troops from Germany to Portugal, while Spain hoped to seize Portugal and its empire.

The Portuguese situation was desperate. The great Lisbon earthquake, tsunami and fire of 1755 had completely destroyed the Portuguese capital, killing tens of thousands and damaging most of the Portuguese fortresses. Rebuilding a new Lisbon left no money to sustain an army or navy; and even the military cadres who had died in the earthquake were not replaced by 1762. From 1750 onward the Brazilian gold supply (which made Portugal by far the largest gold owner on earth during the 18th century) started its irreversible decline, and the price of Brazilian sugar also fell as British and Dutch demand reduced.

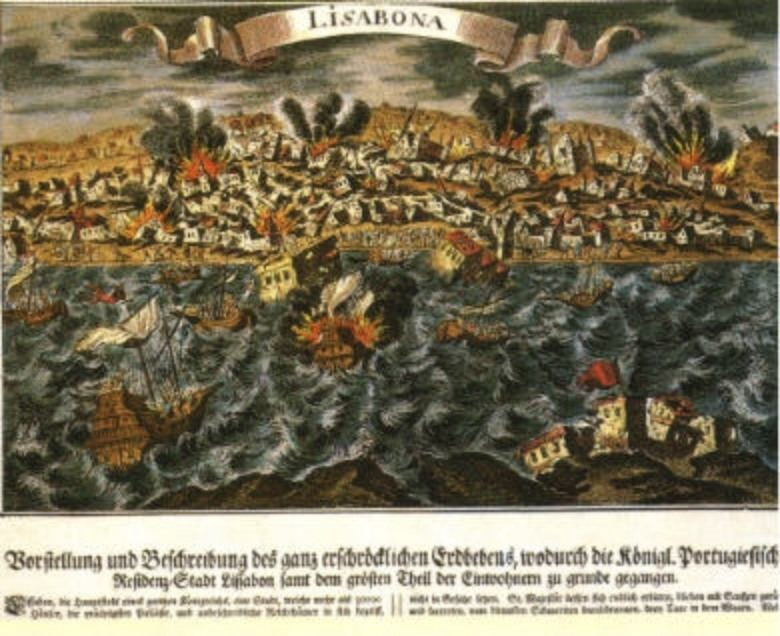
The 1755 Lisbon earthquake horrified Europe, sparking a debate about the nature of its causes among the main European philosophers, mainly between Voltaire and Rousseau: Providential or natural? The famous pamphlet A Spanish Prophecy, published in 1762 in Madrid, intended to prove that all the carnage suffered by the Portuguese during the earthquake, tsunami and ensuing fire, were divine punishment for their alliance with the British heretics. British help included 6,000 barrels of meat, 4,000 of butter,1,200 sacks of rice, 10,000 quarters of flour and £100,000 for relief (while Spanish and French money offers were refused)

The Portuguese navy – which had been powerful during the 15th century, was reduced to only three ships of the line and some frigates. The general picture of the Portuguese "army" was calamitous: The regiments were incomplete, the military warehouses were empty, and there were no military hospitals. By November 1761, the troops had not been paid for a year and a half (they received 6 months payment on the eve of war), and many soldiers lived from robbery, or "assassinating for a livelihood". Military discipline was a distant memory and the greater part of the troops was "without uniforms and without arms". When French Ambassador O'Dunne delivered the ultimatum to the Portuguese government (1 April 1762), a party of sergeants with a captain knocked on the door, begging for alms. Recruitment often included trapping vagrants and transients during popular gatherings. The Count of Saint-Priest, French ambassador in Portugal, reported: "It was impossible to find an army in greater disorder than in Portugal. When the Count of Lippe [the supreme allied commander, sent by England] arrived, the army had as Field Marshal the Marquis de Alvito, who had never learned to shoot a rifle or command a regiment, even in peacetime. The colonels, mostly great Lords, placed as officers in their regiments their valets. It was very common to see soldiers, mostly ragged, begging for alms [even the sentinels of the royal palace]. This state of disorder had just finished shortly before I arrived. We need to be fair. The Count of Lippe established discipline, forced officials to choose between the position in the regiment or his previous condition as valets. (...).With the aid of some foreign officials, military bodies were disciplined and when I arrived, were already trained."

To reinforce their ultimatum and press the Portuguese government, Spanish and French troops started gathering on the Portuguese northern frontiers since 16 March 1762, alleging it was merely a "preventive army". The Portuguese government declared its intention of defending to the last. As soon as news of the entry of Spanish troops into the North of the kingdom reached the Court, Portugal declared war both on Spain and France (18 May 1762), asking for British financial and military assistance. Spain and France declared war on 15 and 20 June, respectively.

== Invasions ==
=== First invasion of Portugal (Trás-os-Montes) ===
On 30 April 1762 a Spanish force penetrated into Portugal through the province of Trás-os-Montes and posted a proclamation entitled "reasons for entering Portugal", in which the Spaniards declared that they were coming not as enemies, but as friends and liberators who came to free the Portuguese people from the "heavy shackles of England", the "tyrant of the seas".

On 5 May, the Marquis of Sarria, leading an army of 22,000 men started the real invasion. Portugal declared war on both Spain and France (18 May 1762).

The region of Trás-os-Montes was the main theater of operations during the first Franco-Spanish invasion of Portugal (May–June, 1762).

Miranda, the only fortified and provisioned fortress of the province, was besieged on 6 May 1762, but an accidental and huge powder explosion (20 tons) killed four hundred and opened two breaches in the ramparts, forcing the surrender on 9 May 1762. Bragança (12 May), Chaves (21 May), and Torre de Moncorvo (23 May) were open cities without soldiers, and were occupied without firing a gun. There were neither fortresses with intact walls nor regular troops inside the entire province of Trás-os-Montes (neither powder nor provisions). The Spanish general joked about the complete absence of Portuguese soldiers across the province: "I can not discover where these insects are."

At first, the relationship of the invaders with the civil population was apparently excellent. The Spaniards paid double for the provisions they acquired, and there wasn't a single shotgun. But Madrid had committed a double error: since the Spaniards believed that the simple show of power would be enough to induce Portugal to submission, they entered the country almost without provisions, which would undermine the entire campaign. They also assumed that the country could provide them all the necessary food. When this proved an illusion, the Spanish army imposed forced requisitions of provisions to the populations. These were the trigger for a popular revolt, with war for food feeding war.

==== The "Portuguese ulcer" ====
Victory seemed a matter of time, and in Madrid, it was confidently expected that the fall of Porto was imminent, but suddenly the invaders were confronted with a national rebellion, which spread around the Provinces of Trás-os-Montes and Minho. Francisco Sarmento, the governor of Trás-os-Montes, posted a declaration ordering the people to resist the Spaniards or be branded rebels. The Spaniards were confronted by deserted villages with neither food nor peasants to build roads for the army. Together with some militias and ordnances (respectively a kind of Portuguese military institution of 2nd and 3rd line), gangs of civilians armed with sickles and guns attacked the Spanish troops, taking advantage of the mountainous terrain. The Spaniards suffered heavy losses and high rates of disease. Several reports on the ground (published in the British press in 1762) confirm this: "[Province of] Beira. Almeida, June 12, (...) the Enemy [Spaniards], to the number of eight thousand has entered the frontier... several parties have rallied forth from the camp, and had pillaged the villages upon that frontier, and had not even spared the churches; but that these parties had been driven back by the Portuguese militia, who had killed and taken prisoners upwards of two hundred Spaniards (...). [Province of] Minho...June 20...those [Spaniards] who retired from Villa Real and Mirandela towards Miranda, were attacked upon their march by the militia... who killed some of the Spaniards, and took twenty odd prisoners...we have advice of the 22d [June], that a convoy of sixty mules, laden with provisions, had been taken from the enemy about two leagues from Chaves."

According to a French contemporary source, more than 4,000 Spaniards died in the hospital of Braganza, both from wounds and disease. Many others were killed by the guerrillas, taken prisoners, or died from starvation – which was becoming a growing problem. The Portuguese nationalism and the atrocities committed by the Spanish army against peasant villages – mainly during food expeditions – were the fuel for the revolt. Even the King of Spain Charles III, in his declaration of war to Portugal (15 June 1762) – one month and a half after the start of the invasion and almost one month after the Portuguese declaration of war on Spain – complained that many Portuguese populations, conducted by undercover officers, had treacherously killed several Spanish detachments. In another example, the Portuguese Corregidor of Miranda reported in August 1762 that the invading forces in the north had

experienced a mortal hatred from the countrymen, who have made them war, and do not spare neither soldiers nor sutlers...and initially even killed defectors, accusing them of being spies. No countrymen take groceries to the stronghold... and sutlers don't dare seeking them out without an escort of more than 30 men, because of fewer, none of them comes back to the fortress.

The invaders were forced to split their forces in order to protect conquered strongholds, find food, and escorting convoys with supplies. The food for the army had to come from Spain itself, which made it vulnerable to attacks. Unless the Spanish army could quickly take Porto, starvation would make their situation untenable.

==== Porto: the decisive campaign ====
A Spanish force of 3,000 to 6,000 men led by O'Reilly left Chaves, and advanced towards Porto. This caused great alarm among the British in the city, where their community had many stores with provisions and 30,000 pipes of wine waiting shipment. Measures for evacuating them were initiated by the British Admiralty, while the Portuguese governor of Porto was ordered to leave the city (which he did not). But when the Spaniards tried to cross the River Douro between Torre de Moncorvo and Vila Nova de Foz Côa, they met O'Hara and his Portuguese force of hundreds of peasants with guns and some Ordinances, helped by women and children in the hills of the southern margin (25 May). In the battle that followed, the Spanish assaults were completely beaten off with losses. Panic took possession of the invaders, who made a hasty retreat and were chased by the peasants until Chaves (the expedition's starting point). In the words of the contemporaneous French general Dumouriez, who went to Portugal in 1766 to study the campaign of 1762 in loco, writing a famous report sent to the King of Spain and to the French foreign minister Choiseul:

O'Reilly... turned back and made a very disorderly retreat; at Villa Pouca, and as far as Chaves, the peasants harassed him exceedingly, and had the glory of driving him back with loss and disgrace, though their number did not exceed 600, nor had they a single military man with them. This feat was highly celebrated in Portugal, and the particulars of it repeated with great pride. The failure in this operation occasioned the retreat of the Spanish army [from Portugal] to Zamora [Spain] (pp. 18–19). (...). He owed this defeat to the appearance of fair (p.249) ..."

— In An Account of Portugal, as it Appeared in 1766 to Dumouriez.

On 26 May, another part of the Spanish army that had marched from Chaves towards the province of Minho (Porto being the final goal), engaged in battle with the Portuguese ordnances at the mountains of Montalegre and the outcome was similar: the Spaniards had to retreat with losses.

... After having become masters of Miranda, Bragança and Chaves, places with no garrisons or walls, the Spanish detached 12 thousand men, part on Montalegre, part on Vila Real. The division which went on Montalegre was strong of 4,000 combatants; however burghers, most of whom had neither rifles nor swords, with some companies of the King's troops, routed this body and caused it to lose many people.

— Contemporary account of the Battle of Montalegre in the jornal Le Nouvelliste Suisse , July 1762.

An army of 8,000 Spaniards sent towards Almeida (in the province of Beira) also suffered defeat: the invaders were driven back after suffering 200 casualties inflicted by the militias, and 600 dead in a failed assault to the fortress of Almeida (according to contemporary British sources)

Finally, reinforcements were sent to Porto and the province of Trás-os-Montes, who occupied the passes and defiles, endangering the Spanish withdrawal, and at the same time, making it inevitable. Letters published in the British press few days later added: "This is all the information we have had to this day, May 29 [1762]. The officers cannot find terms to express the courage of the militia and the zeal and eagerness which the people show to be engaged with the enemy."

The campaign had been commenced by the Spaniards on the side of Tras os Montes, in which province Miranda, Braganza, and some other towns, had fallen into their hands. They next resolved to proceed against Oporto, but this design was frustrated by the bravery of the peasants, who took possession of the defiles, and compelled the Spanish army to a disorderly retreat. Disappointed in this quarter the enemy turned their steps towards the province of Beira [abandoning Trás-os-Montes] ...

— Orderly book of Lieut. Gen John Burgoyne

The outcome of the battle of Douro proved crucial for the failure of the Spanish invasion, because as Dumouriez explained: "Portugal was at that time without troops and planet-struck; had the [Spanish] army advanced rapidly upon Porto it must have taken it without firing a gun. Great resources would have been found there, both in money, stores and provisions, and an excellent climate; the Spanish troops would not have perished as they did, with hunger and want of accommodations; the face of affairs would have been totally changed."

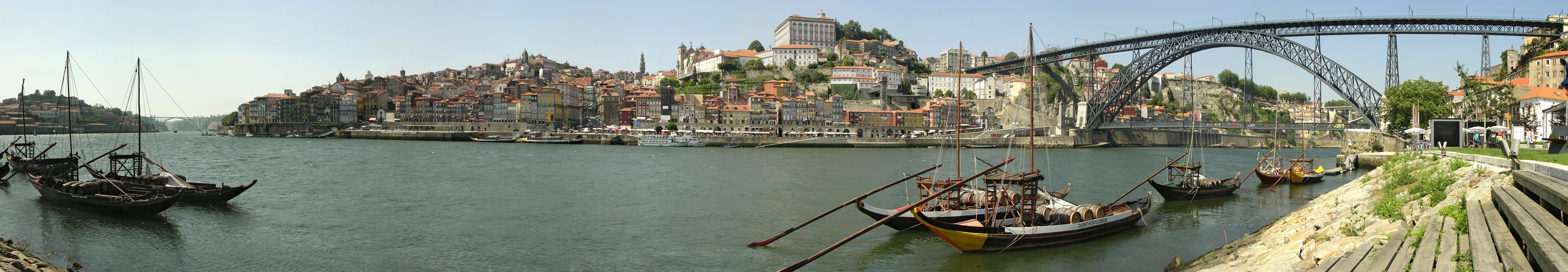
The city of Porto, on the north bank of the Douro River. Its fate was decided at the Battle of Douro (25 May 1762).

==== Spanish withdrawal ====
In addition to these setbacks, and similarly to the Napoleonic soldiers a few decades later, the Spaniards were experiencing carnage. A contemporary document notes that it was impossible to walk in the mountains of the province of Trás-os-Montes because of the nauseating odour of countless Spanish corpses, which the peasants refused – motivated by pure hate – to bury. Even inside the occupied cities the invaders were not safe: of about half a thousand miqueletes who entered Chaves (21 May 1762), only eighteen were still alive by the end of June. According to the Spanish military historian José Luis Terrón Ponce, the total Spanish casualties during the first invasion of Portugal (caused by the guerrillas, diseases and desertion) was over 8,000 men. (In 1766, Dumouriez had evaluated this number at 10,000 losses, and he recommended the Spaniards to avoid this province of Trás-os Montes in a future invasion).

Having failed the main military target of the campaign (Porto, the second city of the kingdom), suffering terrible losses from famine and the guerrillas (who cut off their food supplies), and eventually threatened by the advancing Portuguese regular army at Lamego – which could split the two wings of the Spanish army (the force trying to reach the south bank of the Douro and the other aiming Porto through the mountains) the diminished and demoralized Spanish army was forced to withdraw towards Spain (end of June 1762), abandoning all their conquests with the only exception of the city of Chaves (in the frontier). As a French military put it:

"The Spaniards have always been unhappy in their expeditions against the Province of Trás-os-Montes. During the war of 1762, they were repulsed by the peasants alone, after experiencing great losses."

— Cited in Lettres Historiques et Politiques sur le Portugal

The first invasion had been defeated by the peasants alone, virtually without Portuguese regular troops or British troops, and very soon the Marquis of Sarria, the Spanish commander, would be replaced by Count of Aranda. In order to save his and Charles III's face, Sarria "asked" to be removed for "reasons of health" immediately after the conquest of Almeida and after receiving the Order of the Golden Fleece: "The old Marquis of Sarria was rewarded for his failure with the Order of the Golden Fleece, and his 'voluntary resignation' was accepted." Spain had lost the opportunity of defeating Portugal before the arrival of British troops and their assembling with the Portuguese regular forces.

==== Spanish atrocities ====
Many civilians were killed or transferred into Spain, together with the silver of the churches and the horses of the villages. A contemporary account published in British press during this invasion is quite revealing:

"The Spaniards, instead of advancing boldly to face their enemies, content themselves with dispatching flying parties from their camp, who commit unheard of barbarities among the small villages; robbing and murdering the inhabitants; setting fire to their crops, and not even sparing the sacred furniture belonging to their chapels. On their retreat from Braganza [at the end of the invasion], they plundered the college and church, as well as the houses of several of the principal people; whom, together with several priests, they carried with them into Spain. They also killed several peasants of that neighbourhood in cold blood."

— The Gentleman's and London Magazine: Or Monthly Chronologer, 1741–1794

==== Reorganisation of Portuguese army ====
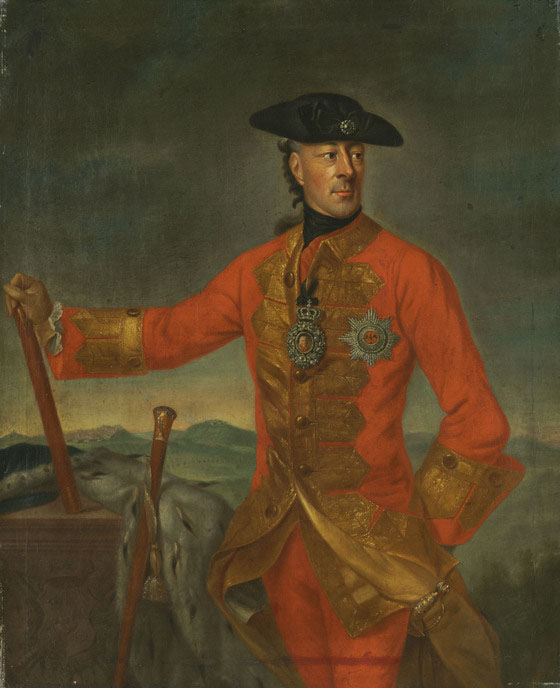
William, Count of Schaumburg-Lippe, allied supreme commander, and one of the best soldiers of his time. Outnumbered in a proportion of three to one, he successfully met the challenge. He trained intensively the Portuguese army in a record time, and chose to use small units against the flanks and rear of the invader's big battalions (taking advantage of the mountainous terrain). He destroyed the enemy's will to fight by starvation, the bleeding of his forces in a guerrilla warfare, and by an exhausting war of marches and counter marches (the so-called "Fantastic War").

Meanwhile, a British expeditionary force landed: the 83rd, 91st regiments of infantry, together with the major portion of the 16th light dragoons (all led by Major General George Townshend) arrived at Lisbon in May; while the 3rd, 67th, 75th, and 85th regiments of foot along with two Royal Artillery companies (the main force) only landed from Belle-Isle, in July 1762. The total number of this force is known with exactitude (from official documents): 7,104 officers and men of all arms. Great Britain also sent provisions, ammunition and a loan of £200,000 to the Portuguese ally.

There was some friction between both allies, caused by problems of language, religion and envy; the Portuguese officers felt uncomfortable with being commanded by strangers, and especially with the salaries of their British peers, which was double theirs (so that British officers could keep the salary they had in the British army). In addition to the difficulty of feeding British troops in Portugal, Lippe successfully faced another huge problem: the recreation of the Portuguese army and its integration with the British one. La Lippe selected only 7,000 to 8,000 men out of the 40,000 Portuguese soldiers who were submitted to him, and dismissed all the others as useless or unfit for military service.

Thus, the complete allied army in campaign was about 15,000 regular soldiers (half Portuguese and half British). The militias and ordnances (respectively a kind of Portuguese military institution of 2nd and 3rd line, around 25,000 men in total) were only used to garrison the fortresses whilst some regular troops (1st line) remained in the north of Portugal to face the Spanish troops of Galicia. These 15,000 men had to face a combined army of 42,000 invaders (of whom were 30,000 Spaniards led by Count of Aranda, and 10,000 to 12,000 French commanded by Prince de Beauvau).

Lippe would eventually be successful both in the integration of the two armies as well as in the final action. As noted by historian Martin Philippson: "The new leader was able, in a short time, to reorganize the Portuguese army, and with it, re-enforced by the English, he drove the Spaniards, in spite of their superiority in numbers, across the frontiers, (...)"

=== Aborted Spanish invasion (Alentejo) ===
The Franco-Spanish army had been divided into three divisions: the Northeast Division, in Galicia, invaded the northeast Portuguese provinces of Trás-os-Montes and Minho with Porto as its ultimate goal (first invasion of Portugal, May–June 1762); the central division (reinforced by French troops and the remnants of the northeast division) – which afterwards invaded the Portuguese province of Beira (centre of Portugal) towards Lisbon (second invasion of Portugal, July–November 1762); and finally a southern army's corps (near Valencia de Alcántara), designed to invade the province of Alentejo, in the south of Portugal.

The successes of the Franco-Spanish army in the beginning of the second invasion of Portugal (Beira) caused such alarm that Joseph I pressured his commander, Count of Lippe, for an offensive campaign. Since the enemy was gathering troops and ammunitions in the region of Valencia de Alcántara, near Alentejo – preparing a third Spanish invasion – Lippe chose to take preemptive action by attacking the invader on his own ground, in Estremadura. The troops around Valencia de Alcántara were the advanced lines of the Spanish third corps (southern division), and this city was a main supply depôt, containing magazines and a park of artillery. The allies had the surprise factor on their side as the disparity of numbers and resources was so great that the Spaniards did not expect such a risky operation: they had neither barricades nor advanced piquets, or even guards, except in the city's great square.

On the morning of 27 August 1762, a force of 2,800 Anglo-Portuguese under Burgoyne attacked and took Valencia de Alcántara, defeated one of the best Spanish regiments (the Seville's regiment), killed all the soldiers that resisted, captured three flags and several troops and officers – including the Major-General Don Miguel de Irunibeni, responsible for the invasion of Alentejo, and who had come into the city the day before (along with two colonels, two captains and seventeen subaltern officers). Many arms and ammunition were captured or destroyed.

The Battle of Valencia de Alcántara not only galvanized the Portuguese army at a critical phase of the war (in beginning of the second invasion), but also prevented a third invasion of Portugal by the Alentejo, a plain and open province, through which the powerful Spanish chivalry could march towards the vicinity of Lisbon without opposition.

Burgoyne was rewarded by the King of Portugal, Joseph I, with a large diamond ring, together with the captured flags, while his international reputation skyrocketed.

=== Second invasion of Portugal (Beira) ===
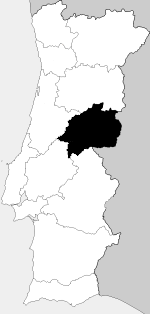
The Province of Lower Beira was particularly devastated during the second Franco-Spanish invasion of Portugal (July–November, 1762). A self-destructive scorched earth strategy was the price of the Portuguese victory.

After being defeated in the province of Trás-os-Montes, Sarria's shattered army returned into Spain by Ciudad Rodrigo and gathered with the centre's army. Here, the two Spanish corps were joined by a French army of 12,000 men, led by Prince de Beauvau, putting the total number of the Bourbon invaders at 42,000 men.

==== Illusion of victory ====
The original plan to converge on Porto through Trás-os Montes was abandoned and replaced by a new one: this time Portugal would be invaded through the province of Beira, in the east centre of the country, and the target would be Lisbon. Sarria was replaced by the Count of Aranda, while the Spanish minister Esquilache went to Portugal to support and organize the logistic of the Spanish army so that it had food for 6 months.

Considering the complete unpreparedness of the Portuguese army, and the huge disparity of forces (30,000 Spaniards plus 12,000 French versus 7,000–8,000 Portuguese plus 7,104 British), the Marquis of Pombal assembled twelve ships in the Tagus estuary prepared, if necessary, to transfer the Portuguese king and court into Brazil.

In the beginning of the second invasion, A British observer – after describing the Portuguese soldiers as the "wretched troops" he ever saw, who were "often five days together without bread, and the horses without forage" – wrote he was apprehensive that Lippe, overwhelmed by difficulties, ended up asking for resignation. Indeed, at first the Franco-Spanish army occupied several fortresses with ruined walls and without regular troops: Alfaiates, Castelo Rodrigo, Penamacor, Monsanto, Salvaterra do Extremo, Segura (17 September 1762), Castelo Branco (18 September), and Vila Velha (2 October) surrendered practically without firing a gun, as lamented by the allied commander, Lippe. After the war, several fortresses governors would be tried and convicted for treason and cowardice.

Almeida, the main fortress of the Province, was in such a state that O'Hara, the British officer who led the guerrilleros and militias at the battle of Douro, advised the stronghold 's commander to take his garrison out of the fortress and put it in nearby country where defence could be much more easily sustained. (The commander responded that he could not do that without superior orders). Its garrison, consisting only in two regular regiments and three militia regiments (totalling 3,000 to 3, 500 men), experienced a drastic reduction in their numbers for desertion, during the enemy's approaching and siege. Facing an overwhelming combination of 24,000 Spanish and 8,000 French, and poorly commanded by an incompetent, the octogenarian Palhares (whose substitute sent by the government did not arrive on time), the remaining 1, 500 men surrendered with honours of war, after a symbolic resistance of nine days (25 August).

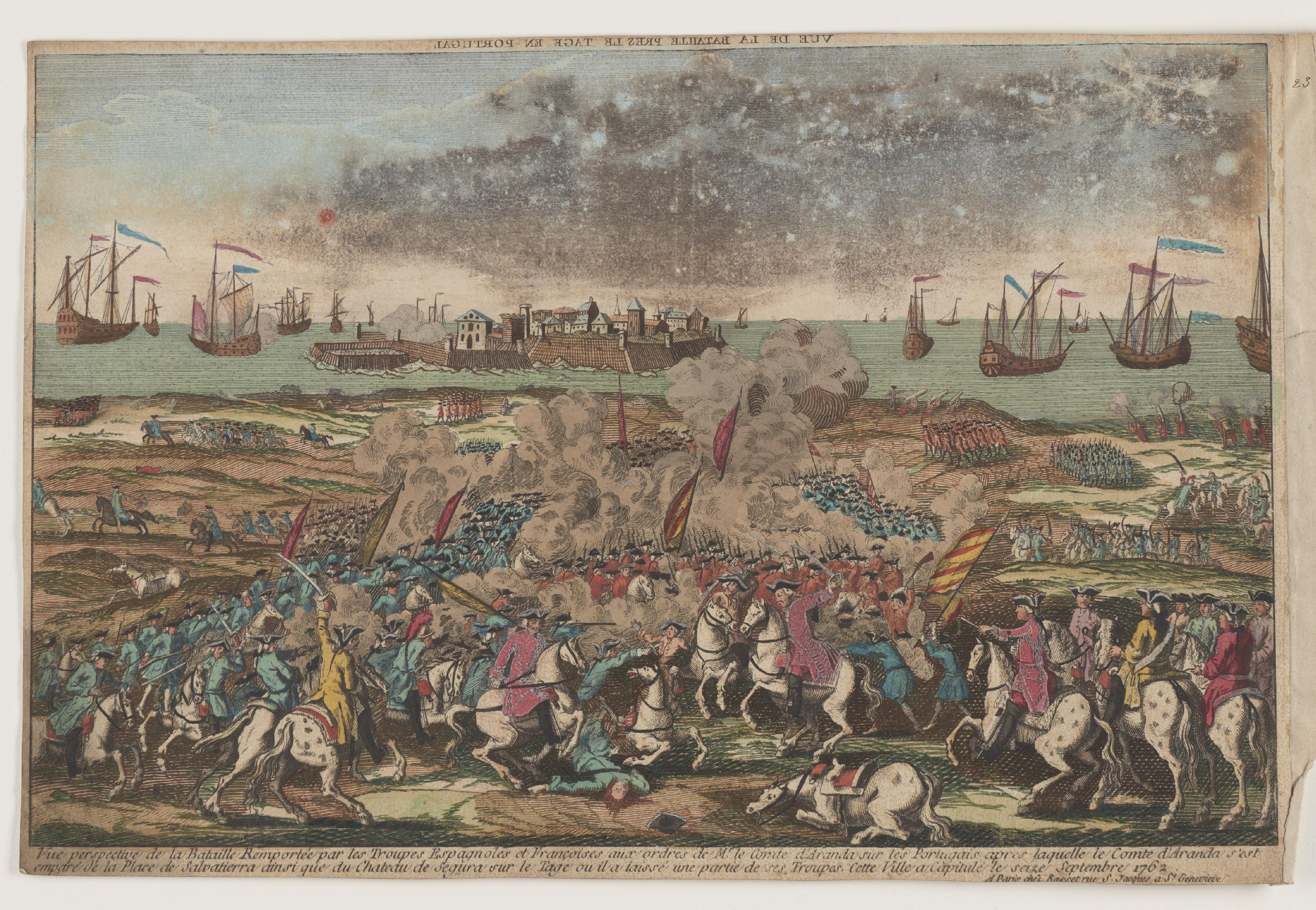
Battle of Salvaterra de Magos won by Spanish and French troops, led by the Count of Aranda, against the Portuguese in September 1762

According to Dumouriez, the garrison had fired only 5 or 6 artillery shots – disobeying Palhares's prohibition of firing on the enemy – and had suffered only two dead. Having capitulated on condition of not serving against Spain for six months, they were allowed to go free, carry their guns and luggage, and join the Portuguese garrison of Viseu: The Bourbon allies were so amazed with such a hasty proposal for surrender (Palhares would die in a Portuguese prison), that they conceded all demanded.

The capture of Almeida (with 83 canons and 9 mortars) was publicly celebrated in Madrid as a great victory and represented the peak of the initial Spanish predominance. This auspicious beginning led to the impression that the Bourbons were winning the war, but in reality, the occupation of these strongholds would prove to be not only useless, but also harmful to the invaders, as pointed by historian George P. James:

when these places were taken, the Spanish forces were in a somewhat worse situation than they were before; for penetrating into the wild and uncultivated districts of Beira, with scarcely any road, and, neither abundance of food nor water, they lost more men by disease than all the forces of Portugal would have destroyed ...

In addition to this, a new popular revolt exponentially worsened the situation of the invaders.

Like Napoleon during the Peninsular War, the Franco-Spaniards of Aranda would learn in 1762 – at their own expense – that the (brief) occupation of several strongholds, although greatly praised by Spanish historiography, was irrelevant to the ultimate outcome of a war of guerrilla and movements.

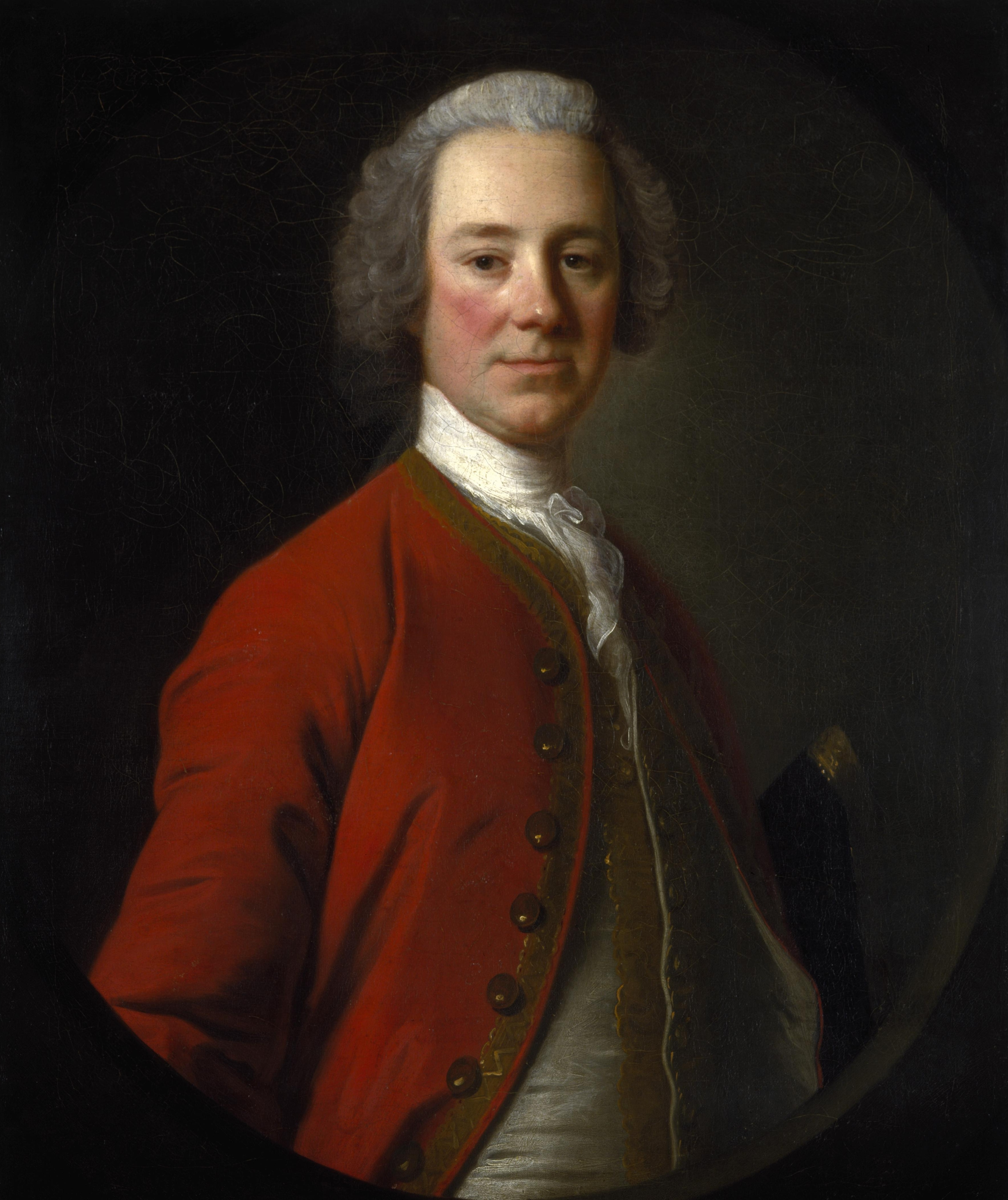
John Campbell, 4th Earl of Loudoun 2nd in command to the Anglo Portuguese army. Painting by Allan Ramsay

==== People in arms ====
The initial Franco-Spanish success in Beira benefited from the strong popular opposition to the regime of the Marquis of Pombal, the ruthless Portuguese prime minister; but the massacres and plunder perpetrated by the invaders – especially by the French – soon incurred the peasants' odium. Having penetrated so deeply into the mountainous interior of Portugal, the Franco-Spanish rows find themselves harassed and decimated in ambushes by guerrilleros, who cut their lines of communication and supplies behind them. As Napoleonic general Maximilien Sébastien Foy put it:

It was nevertheless that indocile host of ordinances rather than the secrets of strategy, which in 1762 paralyzed the Count d'Aranda's Spaniards, and the Prince of Beauvau's Frenchmen. The most skilful general will not long maintain himself in mountains, where the inexhaustible energy of an armed population is interposed between the acting army and its base of operations.

— In History of the War in the Peninsula, Under Napoleon.

Several French participants in the campaign stated that the most feared fighters were the guerrilleros of Trás-os-Montes and Beira. The inhabitants of the province of Beira wrote to the Portuguese prime minister informing him that they did not need regular soldiers, and were going to fight alone. As explained by Spanish prime minister Godoy:

All the Portuguese, in accordance with the fundamental laws of the country, were soldiers and defenders of the realm until 60 years of age...poured into the roughs, in the heights, in the ravines ... waged a war of guerrilla, causing many more losses on the enemy than the regular [Anglo-Portuguese] troops. The war of positions, marches and counter-marches, imposed upon us by the Count of Lippe, in which we suffered countless losses, was mainly sustained by the armed peasantry.

— Manuel Godoy, Prince of the Peace in Memorias.

Sometimes the guerrilleros tortured their numerous prisoners, which in turn generated retaliations upon the civilians, in an endless spiral of violence. But while the peasant's casualties could be absorbed by their inexhaustible numbers, the same was not true for the invaders. Even in the occupied cities and villages, the populations defied and rebelled against the Franco-Spaniards, according to a letter sent by D`Aranda to Lippe, asking him to put a stop to it. Many of them were executed.

==== Abrantes: turning point ====
Instead of trying to defend the extensive Portuguese frontier, Lippe retreated into the mountainous interior to defend the line of the River Tagus, which was equivalent to a forward defence of Lisbon. Lippe's main goals consisted in avoiding at all cost a battle against such a superior enemy (disputing instead the gorges and mountain passes, while attacking the enemy flanks with small units), and also preventing the Franco-Spaniards from crossing the formidable barrier represented by the river Tagus. If the Bourbon armies could cross this river, they would reach the fertile province of Alentejo, whose plains would allow their numerous cavalry to reach easily the region of Lisbon. Indeed, immediately after the capture of Almeida, Aranda marched with the intention of crossing the Tagus into the Alentejo at the most propitious point: Vila Velha, where the Spanish army of Philip V of Spain had crossed the river, during the war of the Spanish succession some years before. Lippe, however, anticipated this movement and moved faster. He got to Abrantes and posted a detachment under Burgoynne at Niza and another one under the Count of Santiago near Alvito, to obstruct the passage of the river Tagus at Vila Velha; so that when the invading army came up, they found all these strategic positions occupied (and all boats taken or destroyed by the Portuguese). Therefore, and as Lippe had predicted, the invaders had only two options: return into Spain, to cross the Tagus at Alcántara (which they considered dishonourable since this would imply to withdraw before inferior forces), or go straight to Lisbon through the mountains at the north of the capital, in the "neck" of the "peninsula" containing this city (defined by the river Tagus and the Atlantic). In order to induce the enemy to choose the second route, Lippe placed some forces in these mountains but left some passages open. Since Lisbon was the main goal, Aranda advanced, while the allied forces fortified their excellent positions on the heights that cover Abrantes, halfway between Lisbon and the border (the region among the rivers Tagus, Zêzere and Codes). These mountains presented steep slopes on the side of the invaders (acting as a barrier for them), but were very soft on the side of the allies – which allowed them great freedom of movement and facilitated the reinforcements. Finally, the Anglo-Portuguese army managed to halt the advance of the Bourbon armies toward Lisbon. It was the turning point of the war.

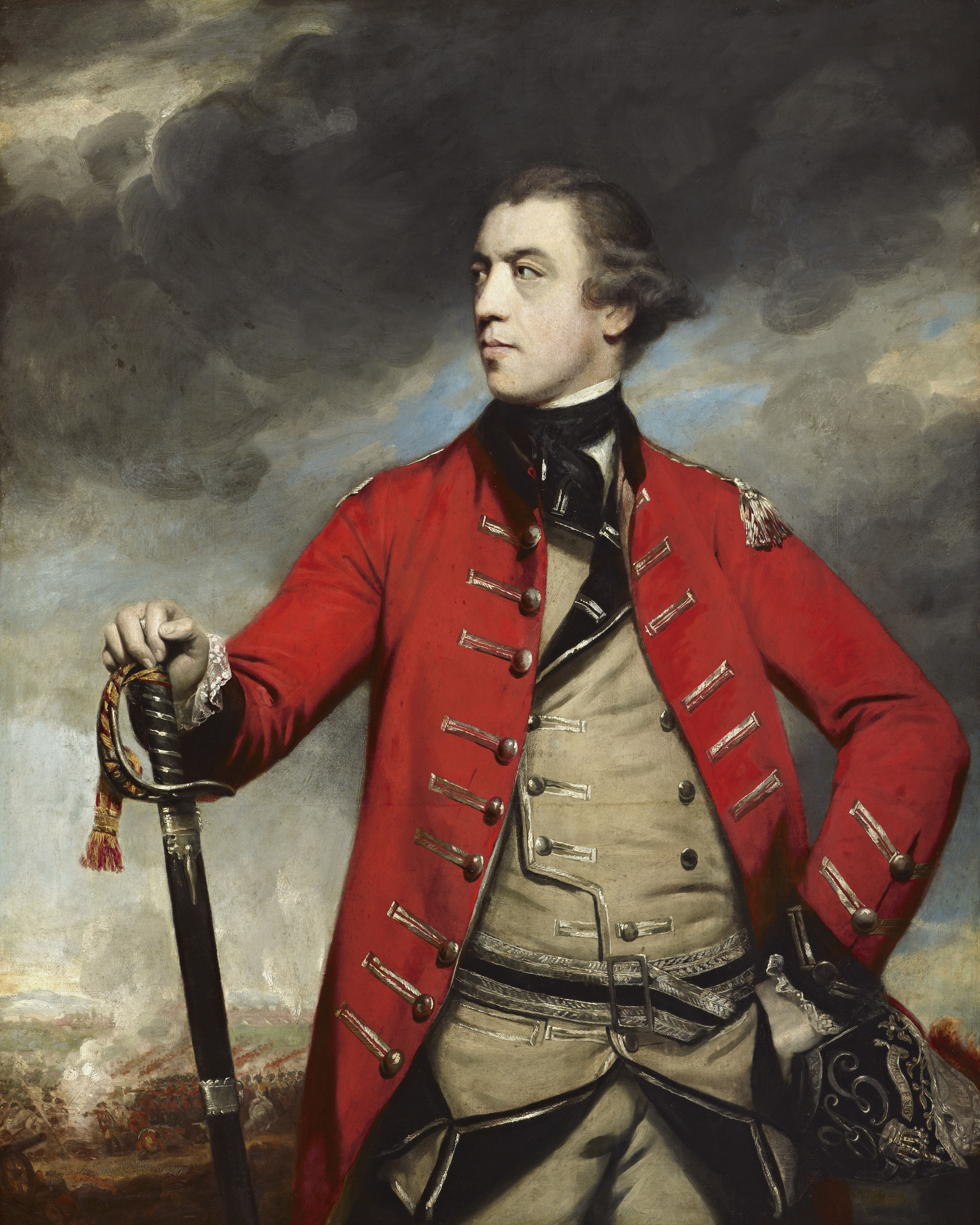
Portrait of John Burgoyne by Joshua Reynolds. 1766 Depiction of Brigadier-General John Burgoyne. Leading an allied force of 3,000 cavalry, two-thirds of whom were Portuguese, he was decisive in the defeat of the Franco-Spanish troops in Europe, during the Seven Years' War: "French and Spanish armies overran Portugal... The British and Portuguese under Count de la Lippe Buckeburgh and Burgoyne defeated them and drove them into Spain."

In order to break this deadlock, the Spaniards went on the offensive towards Abrantes, the allied Headquarters. They took the little castle of Vila Velha (north bank of the Tagus, 3 October 1762) and forced the defiles of St. Simon, near the River Alvito, launching a large force in pursuit of the detachment of Count of Santiago through the mountains. This detachment was very near being entirely cut off, with two Spanish bodies marching upon their front and rear. But la Lippe sent an immediate reinforcement to Count de Santiago, and the combined allied force under Loudoun defeated the chasing Spanish troops at the River Alvito (3 October 1762), and escaped to Sobreira Formosa. But while, the Spaniards were chasing the Count of Santiago's force through the mountains, they weakened their force in Vila Velha. On 5 October 1762, the Anglo-Portuguese commanded by Lee attacked and completely routed the Spaniards at Vila Velha. Several Spaniards were killed (including a general, who died trying to rally his troops), and among the prisoners there were 6 officers. 60 artillery-mules were captured, the artillery and magazines destroyed. Moreover, in the very some day (5 October 1762) the Portuguese of Townshend defeated a French force escorting a convoy at Sabugal, capturing a large quantity of precious supplies.

The invaders did not pass and the offensive was a failure. The tide of the war had reversed and Abrantes proved to be "the key of Portugal" in the River Tagus, for its strategic position.

==== Scorched earth tactics ====
Both armies remained immobilized at Abrantes, facing each other. But while the Anglo-Portuguese continuously reinforced their positions and received provisions, the Bourbon armies had their line of supply and communication virtually cut off by the armed peasants, militia and ordinances in their rear. Worse than this, they were being starved by a deadly tactic of scorched earth. This tactic would be used again in 1810–11 against the French of Masséna, who, similarly to the invaders of 1762 were stopped in their march on Lisbon, being starved and attacked by guerrillas. As noted by the eminent British military historian Sir Charles Oman:

"Throughout Portuguese history the summons to the levy en masse had always been combined with another measure, from which indeed it could not be disentangled-the order to the whole population to evacuate and devastate the land in face of the advancing enemy. The use of the weapon of starvation... the plan for defeating the enemy by the system of devastation...was an ancient Portuguese device, practised from time immemorial against the Castilian invader, which had never failed of success. (...) When Spain had made her last serious assault on Portugal in 1762... the plan had work[ed] admirably..."

Indeed, the Portuguese soldiers and peasants turned the Province of Beira into a desert: populations abandoned villages, bringing with them everything that was edible. The crops and all that could be useful to the enemy was burned or taken. Even the roads and some houses were destroyed.

Thus, the exhausted Franco-Spanish army was forced to choose between staying in front of Abrantes and starve, or withdraw, while still possible, closer to the border.

The allied plan proved almost perfect as it was based in two realities. First, to conquer Portugal the Franco-Spaniards had to take Lisbon. Second, Lisbon could only be attacked from the mountainous North (prevented by the allied defensive system of Abrantes) since Lisbon is protected by the Atlantic Ocean at the West and by the great River Tagus at the South and East, being inside a kind of "peninsula". It exploited to the full both the Portuguese capital's geographical situation (which could always receive provisions by sea), and the erosion of the Franco-Spanish army through starvation caused by a scorched earth strategy and the collapse of its logistic lines (attacked by the guerrilla and other irregular forces).

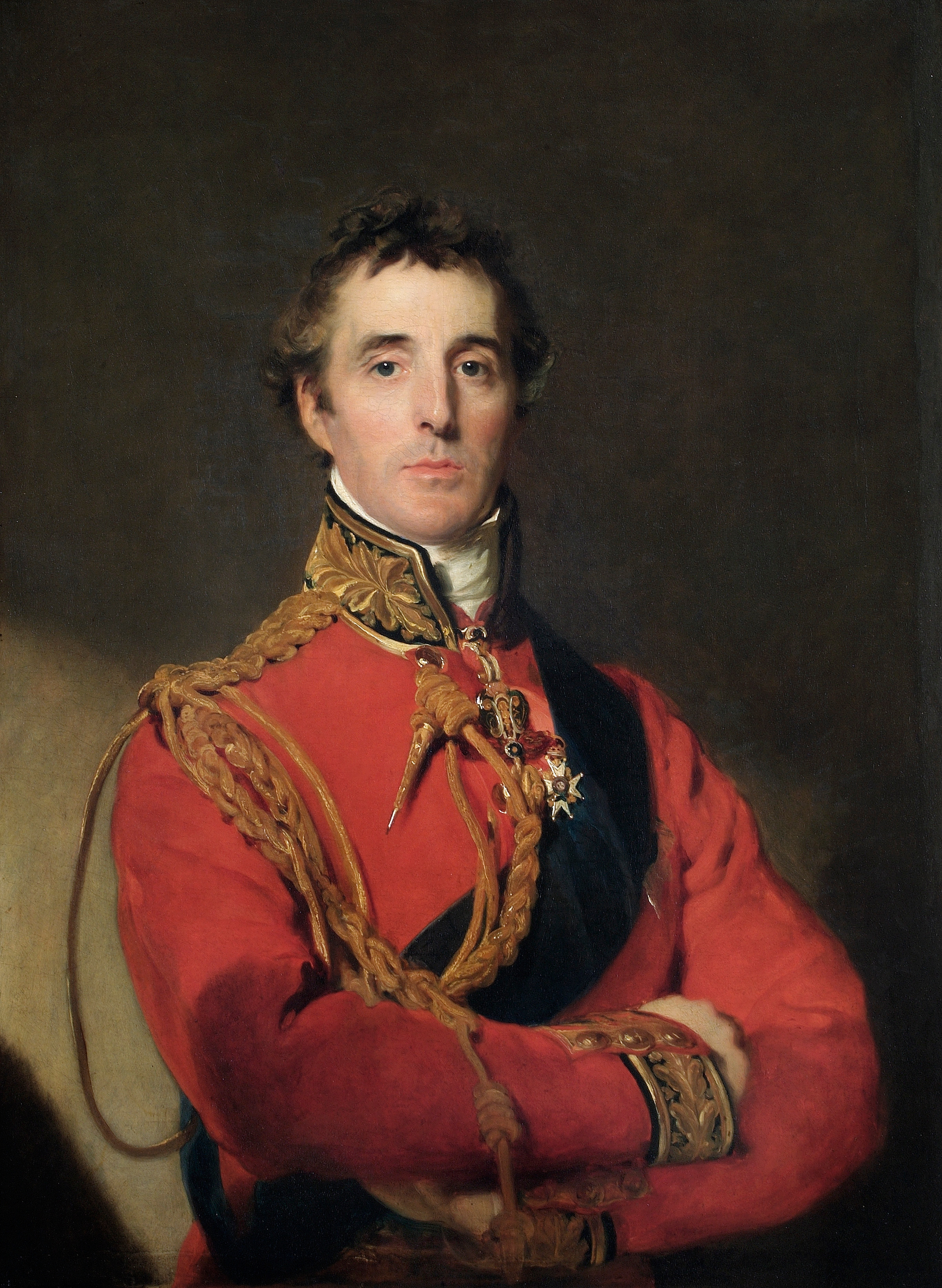
The Duke of Wellington. In 1810, during his campaign against Masséna in Portugal, a British observer noted that "Wellington is acting upon the plans of Comte La Lippe". Several modern historians like Guedela note that "... Count Lippe's methods of making war in 1762 wouldn't be forgotten by Wellington in 1810–11: Wellington had previously read about the Ordenanca and the 1762 war between Portugal and Spain. The King of Portugal ordered his people to attack the Spanish invaders. The inhabitants of villages fled as the Spaniards approached, in the same scorched earth methods used by Wellington in 1810."

The invading army was suffering terrible losses inflicted by the guerrillas, hunger, desertions, and disease; its situation becoming more and more untenable. Sooner or later, the Franco-Spanish army would have to retreat in a very shattered condition:

... the embarrassment of the enemy: they were reduced to a forced inaction, while the difficulties of subsistence, desertion and disease, decimated them, and the horses died for want of fodder (p. 47)... things being in this situation... the enemy... quickly realized that, far from conquering Portugal, this plan would lead his army to ruin (p. 48)."

— Allied commander Lippe in Mémoire de la Campagne de Portugal de 1762.

Then Lippe, seeing that the enemy's situation was desperate, completed it with an audacious move, which decided the campaign: when the Portuguese force of General Townshend – spreading the rumour that was part of a large British force of 20,000 newly landed men- performed an encirclement manoeuvre towards the rear of the demoralized invading army, it withdrew towards Castelo Branco, (from 15 October onwards), which was nearer the frontier and where the new Spanish headquarters were established.

It was then that the allied army left their defensive positions and pursued the (now diminished) Spanish army, attacking its rear, taking many prisoners, and recovering almost all the towns and fortresses previously taken by the Spaniards -which had given Charles III so many hopes. On 3 November 1762, during the reconquest of Penamacor and Monsanto, the Portuguese of Hamilton routed a retreating Spanish cavalry force at Escalos de Cima, while the British of Fenton swept another retreating Spanish corps from Salvaterra. The Spaniards, who had entered Portugal as conquerors, taking provisions by force and torching those villages which refused to supply them, saw themselves now implacably chased in a devastated enemy territory. The nature of the war had reversed: the hunter had become the prey.

==== Collapse of Franco-Spanish army ====
During the retreat, the Franco-Spanish army – weakened by hunger, disease, and torrential rains – collapsed. Thousands defected (the Portuguese government was offering 1, 600 reis for each Spanish soldier who deserted and 3,000 reis to those who enlisted in the Portuguese Army), while their stragglers and wounded suffered a slaughter at the hands of the peasants:

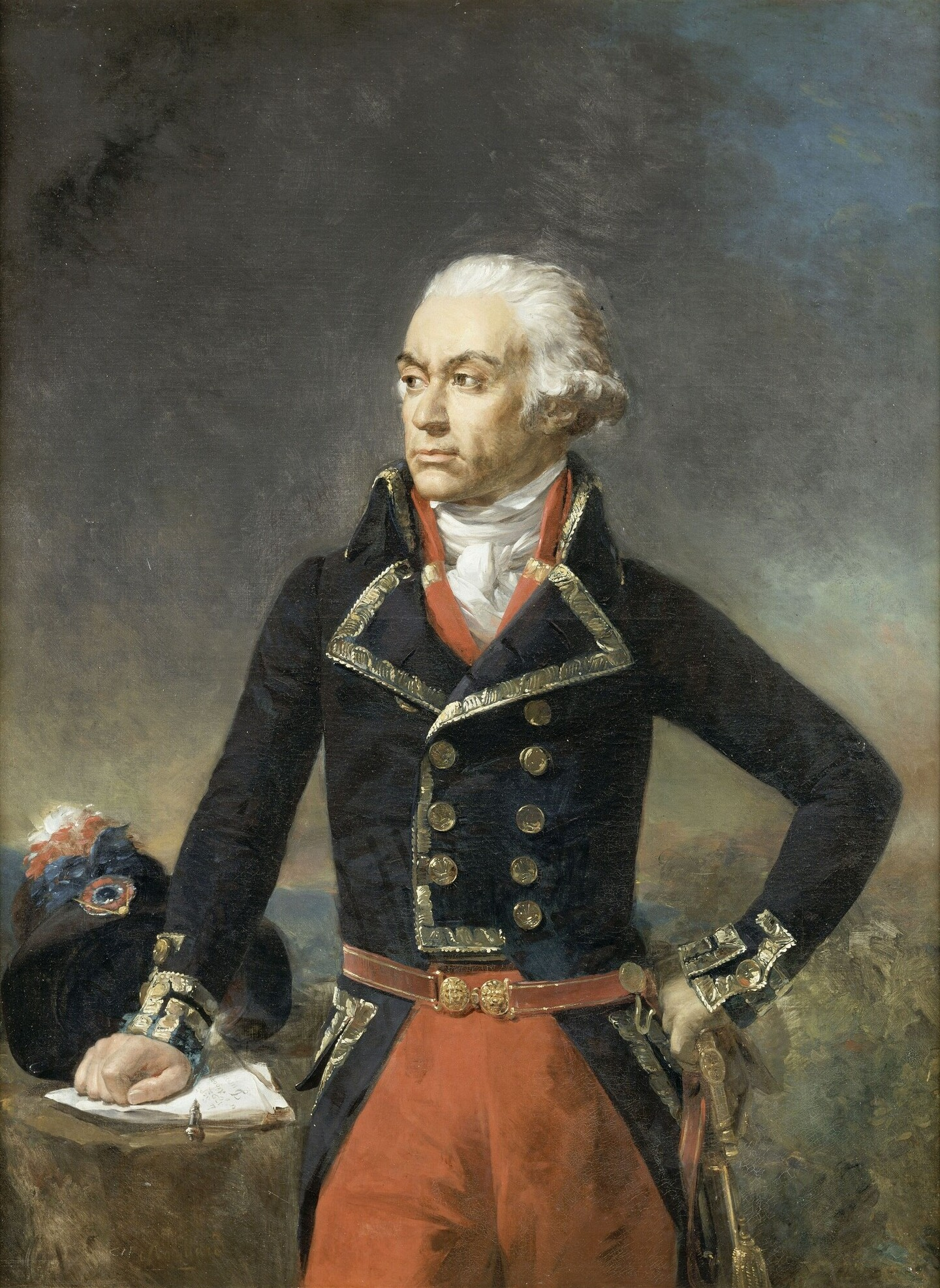
General Dumouriez, French hero who, in 1792, defeated the Prussians at the battle of Valmy and the Austrians at the battle of Jemappes. He was also the main Bourbon chronicler of the Franco-Spanish invasion of 1762: "It is with astonishment we read in the page of History that the Spaniards have almost always been beat by the Portuguese...this contempt [toward the Portuguese]...is itself the fundamental cause of that continual disgrace which the Spaniards have suffered whenever they have carried their arms into Portugal."

... Yesterday and the day before, I spent passports to 45 [Spanish] deserters; and taking into consideration what they tell us, the Spanish army fell into the abyss; they talk of 7,000 deserters, 12 000 men sick in hospitals, in addition to the many who have died (letter of 27 October) ... and [the number of deserters] would be higher, they say, if they were not afraid of [being killed by] our irregulars (letter of 31 October).

— (letters sent by Miguel de Arriaga – the army's secretary – to the Portuguese prime minister, Marquis of Pombal, during the chase of the remnants of the Franco-Spanish army).

The Scottish Colonel John Hamilton wrote in a letter dated 24 October 1762, that the army of Charles III was in a "most ruinous shattered condition", while Lippe would add in his Mémoir (1770) that the Bourbon army was "decimated by starvation, desertion and disease", his cavalry suffering a "debacle". The total losses of the Franco-Spanish army during the first two invasions of Portugal - according to a report of British ambassador in Portugal, Edward Hay, to Pitt's successor, the 2nd Earl of Egremont (8 November 1762) -, was around 30,000 men (half of them deserters, many of whom became prisoners), representing almost three-quarters of the initial invading army. These figures are corroborated by sources close to the Spanish crown: both the Austrian ambassador, Count of Rosenberg, and the Secretary of the Danish embassy, Federico de Goessel, sent independent reports to their governments estimating that - excluding the prisoners and deserters (which were not included in the following number) - Spain had suffered 12,000 deaths in the war against Portugal. The death toll of the French has not been estimated.

More recently, French historian Isabelle Henry wrote about these losses: "Disappointed, facing incredible resistance and losing everything in the field, the Spaniards abandoned the fight and left behind twenty-five thousand men ..."

For its part, the American historian Edmund O'Callaghan estimated that the Spanish army had already lost half of their men even before withdrawing: "Harassed, dispirited, and reduced to almost one half of their original numbers, the Spanish troops retired within their own frontier".

Spanish military historian José Tertón Ponce wrote that since the beginning of the first invasion of Portugal up to the middle of the second invasion – immediately before the Bourbon retreat from Abrantes – the invading army had already suffered 20,000 casualties. There were additional losses during the retreat and third invasion.

Dumouriez, who traveled into Portugal and Spain, collecting testimonies from participants in the invasion of 1762, reported to Madrid and Paris, in 1766, that the Spaniards had lost 15,000 men during the second invasion of Portugal (province of Beira), plus 10,000 soldiers during the first invasion of Portugal (Province of Trás-os-Montes), of whom 4,000 died in the Hospital of Braganza of injuries and sickness. This chronicler makes no estimate of the Spanish casualties in the third invasion of Portugal (province of Alentejo). The Franco-Spanish disaster was summarily captured in these much quoted contemporary words:

... the Court of Spain ordered 40,000 men to march into Portugal (p. 247)... The Spanish forces, when they arrived at the frontier, were reduced to 25,000 men, and never did troops experience a more horrible campaign [2nd invasion]. The sick and the stragglers were almost all of them massacred by the peasants ... the ill-success of the campaign in Portugal; it covered Spain with dishonour, and exhausted her to such a degree as to keep her quiet till the peace (p. 254)."

— (Excerpt from the report of French General Dumouriez, who came to Portugal to study the causes of the Franco-Spanish defeat and develop an effective new plan to attack Portugal. His report was presented to the Spanish king in November 1766 by the French ambassador Ossun, who omitted the passages of the text that mentioned the effectiveness of the Portuguese guerrillas over the Spaniards. It was also sent to the French foreign minister Choiseul).

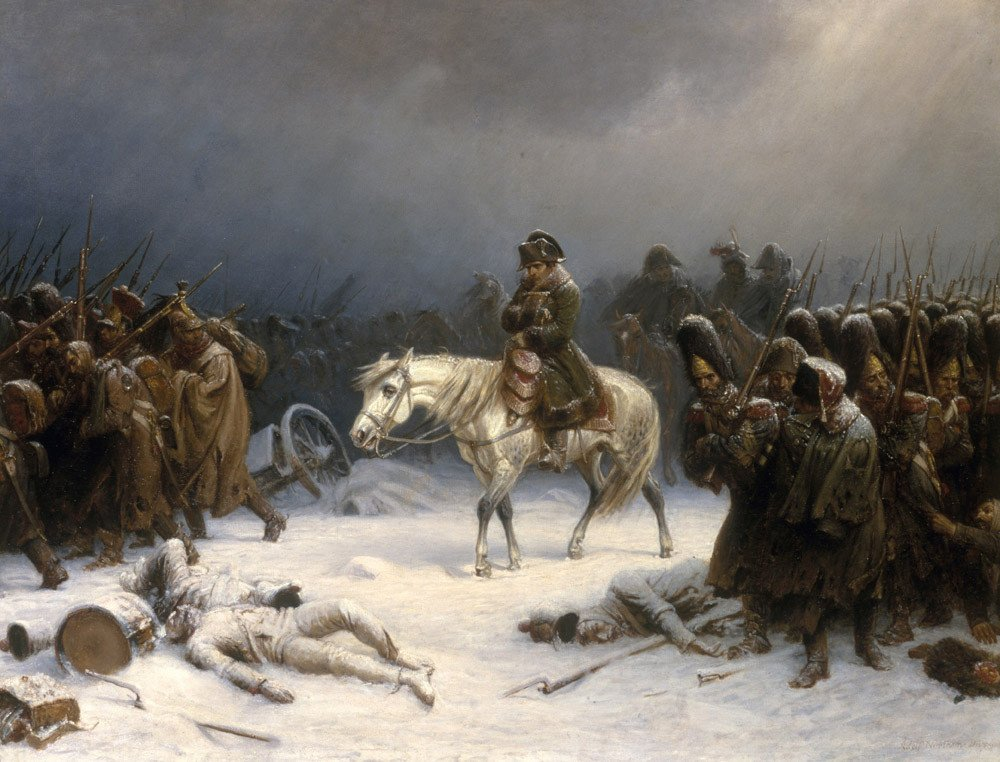
Napoleon's withdrawal from Russia, a painting by Adolph Northen. The Russians in 1812, similarly to the Anglo-Portuguese in 1762, did not need to win one single battle to defeat the invading army -Indeed, they lost all the battles and all the main cities of the Russian empire (including Moscow).Yet, and again like the Anglo-Portuguese in 1762 and 1810, the Russians, using a scorched-earth policy and the guerrillas to disrupt the enemy's supply lines, compelled Napoleon to retreat with an even greater proportional loss than that experienced by Aranda in Portugal in 1762.

Comparatively, during the Napoleonic campaign to conquer Portugal a few years later, in 1810–1811, the French army of Massena lost 25,000 men (of whom 15,000 dead from starvation and disease plus 8,000 deserters or prisoners) to the Anglo-Portuguese of Wellington and guerrillas. The similarities between the two invasions of Portugal (respectively in 1762 and 1810–11) go far beyond the coincidence of the number of casualties suffered by the invaders in both situations. Historian Esdaile wrote that Wellington's "...plan [of 1810–11] was one of the most perfect schemes of defence that have ever been devised... It exploited both the Portuguese capital's geographical situation and the poverty of the Portuguese countryside to the full, whilst at the same time bringing into play traditional responses to invasion in the Form of the ordinances and the devastation of the countryside in a scorched- Earth policy (a similar tactic had actually been Employed against the Spaniards as recently as 1762)."

Only in the first days of July 1762, the total number of Spanish deserters who had entered the Portuguese army allowed creating 2 new full regiments, besides the many who boarded British and Dutch ships. This suggests a brutal defection rate, since the bulk of defections would only occur from mid-October onwards, during the retreat of the invaders, and most of the deserters who survived the Peasants were not incorporated into the Portuguese army, merely being used as informants or scouts. The Bourbon losses were simply devastating. Comparatively, the British losses were vastly inferior: fourteen soldiers were killed in combat and 804 men died from other causes, especially disease.

The tactic of destroying the opponent without fighting and attacking only when he withdraws was the key to victory:

"... the main central attack on Portugal [second invasion] failed utterly ... partly through the skilful measures of the prince of Lippe, who had been placed in charge of the Portuguese army, and strengthened by 7,000 British troops, partly through the bold partisan enterprises carried out against their line of communications by General Burgoyne [and the guerrillas] ... But mainly the invasion failed through the absolute lack of munitions and food; the Portuguese – as was their wont – had swept the country side clean [a deadly scorched earth strategy], (...). After starving for some weeks in a roadless wilderness, the Spanish army retired into Estremadura [Spain] in a sad state of dilapidation. Next spring Charles III sued for peace."

— Journal of the Royal United Service Institution

==== Fall of Spanish headquarters ====
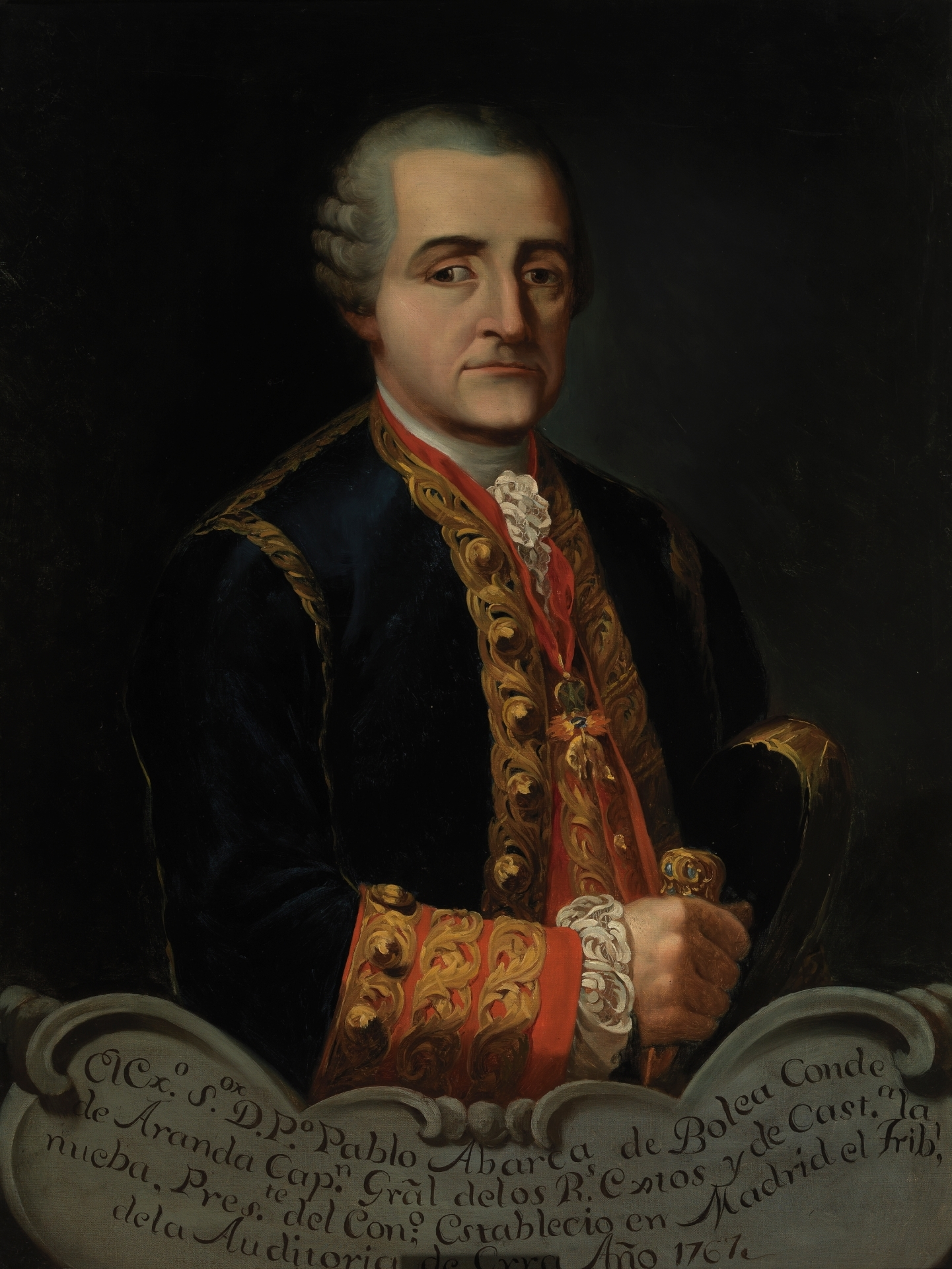
Portrait of Count of Aranda, by Francisco Jover y Casanova. A brilliant Spanish statesman, whose experience as ambassador in Lisbon and writings about the inevitability of invading Portugal would grant him the command of that disastrous invasion: "The autumnal rains now setting in, D'Aranda found himself harassed on all sides by the peasantry, his provisions exhausted;...he dismantled the few fortresses that he had taken, and made a hasty retreat into Spain. This campaign was humiliating enough..."

Nothing better symbolizes the Anglo-Portuguese victory than the final conquest of the Spanish headquarters in Castelo Branco itself. When the allied army began a second encirclement movement to cut off the Spanish forces inside and around Castelo Branco, they fled to Spain, abandoning to their fate all their countless wounded and sick, accompanied by a letter addressed to Townshend, commander of the Portuguese force, in which the Count of Aranda demanded human treatment for their captured men (2 November 1762).

The number of Spaniards taken can be deduced from a letter sent by the Secretary of the Portuguese army to the Portuguese prime minister (six days before the fall of Castelo Branco, 27 October), stating that according to Spanish deserters, the total number of sick men laying in Spanish hospitals was 12,000. By the ends of October, the invading army was concentrated almost entirely in the region around Castelo Branco (out of it, there were only little garrisons in the cities of Almeida and Chaves). This number was exceptionally high, since besides the wounded, there were also many sick: the Spanish army, concentrated around Castelo Branco, was suffering a terrible epidemic. This epidemic was transmitted to the Portuguese population itself, when it returned to the city, shortly after the flight of the Spaniards. Thus, the joy of victory was overshadowed by the grief and mourning of many residents.

American historian Lawrence H. Gipson (winner of the Pulitzer Prize for History):

"Lippe meanwhile had concentrated fifteen thousand British and Portuguese Troops at Abrantes, called 'the Pass to Lisbon'. With the coming of the autumnal rains and with his army not only ravaged by disease and other ills but greatly reduced as the result of desertions, General Aranda found it impossible to remain in the desolate mountainous country that he was confined. He therefore began to withdraw his 'half-starved, half naked' troops, to Spain, and so precipitously, as to leave, according to reports, his sick and incapacitated behind. (...) The Portuguese war had really ended –and as ingloriously as it had auspiciously begun. But this was not the only humiliation suffered by the Spaniards before the year 1762 came to a close."

The defeat of Spain in Portugal was accompanied and aggravated by setbacks in her empire and in the sea: "In one short year the unfortunate Spaniards saw their armies beaten in Portugal, Cuba and Manila torn from their grasp, their commerce destroyed, and their fleets annihilated".

Meanwhile, admirers of Aranda anticipated his victory -taken for granted-, such as the humanist and reformer Stanislaw Konarski, who, writing from distant Poland, and ignoring the Franco-Spanish disaster, composed an ode in Latin in his honor, praising the generosity and humanism of the winner of Portugal towards the inhabitants of Lisbon surrendered to his feet.

==== La Lippe rewarded ====
Thus, except for two frontier strongholds (Chaves and Almeida), all the occupied territory was liberated.

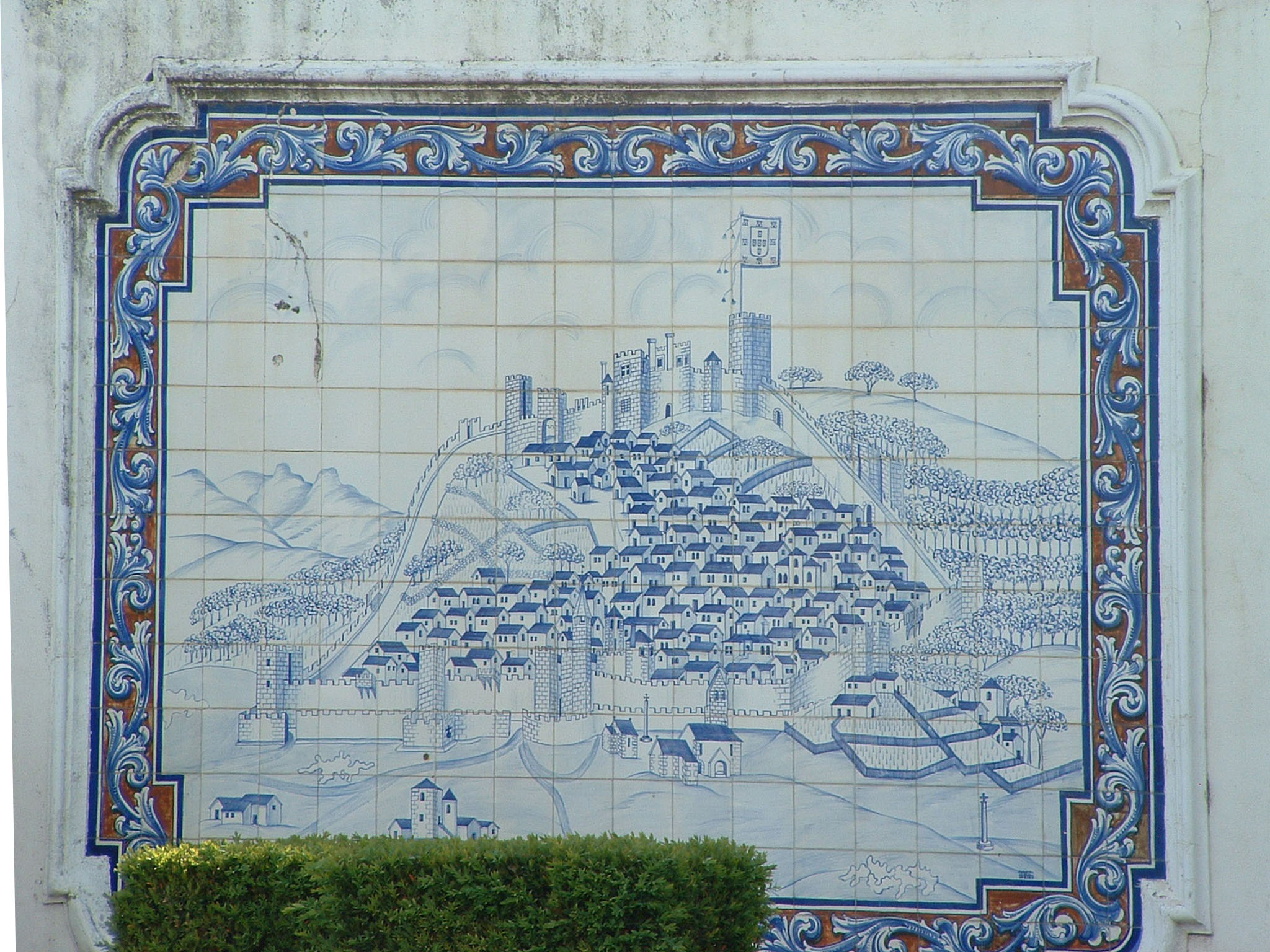
The city of Castelo Branco, used by the Bourbons as Headquarters and Hospital site. Fleeing before an inferior enemy, and leaving behind all their many wounded and sick in the hands of the Anglo-Portuguese, represented a severe blow in Spain's prestige, as well as the end of the second invasion of Portugal.

The remnants of the invading armies were expelled and chased to the border, and even within Spain itself, as would happen in Codicera, where several Spanish soldiers were imprisoned: "Portugal had not accepted the invitation to join France and Spain in this alliance and the latter powers... invaded Portugal. England sent a fleet promptly to Lisbon with 8,000 soldiers who helped drive the invaders back and followed them into Spain herself... The blows she had received were staggering..."

At the end of the war, La Lippe was invited by the Portuguese prime minister Pombal to stay in Portugal, in order to reorganize and modernize the Portuguese army (which he accepted). When Lippe eventually returned to his own country – praised by Voltaire in his famous Encyclopedia, and covered with prestige in Britain, and all Europe – the King of Portugal offered him six cannons of gold (each weighing 32 pounds), a star studded with diamonds, among other gifts, as a sign of gratitude for the man who had saved his throne. The King determined that, even absent of Portugal, La Lippe retained nominal command of the Portuguese army, with the rank of Marshal General. And he was also given the title of "Serene Highness" (25 January 1763).

On the other hand, British government rewarded him with the title of "honorary Field Marshal".

=== Third invasion of Portugal (Alentejo) ===
The third invasion of Portuguese territory was stimulated by the peace negotiations between France and Great Britain and rumours of a general peace (the preliminary Treaty of Fontainebleau was signed on 3 November, one day after the fall of the Spanish Headquarters in Portugal). Indeed, after her defeat in the last invasion, Spain felt compelled to reorganize her troops in order to conquer a portion of Portuguese territory that could be changed by her huge colonial losses at the hands of the British. This would reinforce her position and bargaining power during the peace talks, which would culminate in the Treaty of Paris, on 13 February 1763.

==== Surprise Factor ====
High Alentejo, where the third failed Bourbon invasion occurred.

Since the remnants of the Bourbon troops were settled into winter quarters inside Spain (after crossing the river Tagus at Alcántara), the allied army did the same in Portugal. By then, the French army was practically out of action because in addition to the many dead, deserters and prisoners, there were 3,000 French lying in the hospital of Salamanca.

Yet Aranda correctly assumed that if he attacked first (before next year's spring, when the new campaign was supposed to start), Portuguese garrisons would be completely taken by surprise. This time, the flatness of the terrain in the province of Alentejo, would give full advantage to the Spanish cavalry, instead of what happened in the two previous invasions.

He knew that the Portuguese fortresses were only manned by second line troops (militia), and recent experience proved that siege operations were their Achilles' heel. Besides, the poor state of the Portuguese fortresses in the Alentejo was almost an invitation for invasion: during an inspection to the strongholds of Alentejo, British Brigadier-General Charles Rainsford recommended to remove some of their larger guns to prevent their capture.

However, Lippe had taken preventive measures by strengthening the garrisons of the Alentejo's fortresses near the border (Elvas, Marvão, Ouguela, Arronches, Alegrete and Campo Maior), while transferring some regiments from North to South of the riverTagus, in Alentejo, where they continued in winter quarters (but closer to the gravity center of the next campaign). He also created a reserve force consisting in all the British regiments and some Portuguese troops, near Sardoal. At last, some British officers were sent to command Portuguese garrisons in key strongholds: Field Marshal Clark into Elvas, Colonel Wrey into Alegrete, Colonel Vaughan into Arronches, Captain Brown into Marvão, keeping the Portuguese commanders of Ouguela (Captain Brás de Carvalho) and Campo Maior (Governor Marquis do Prado). This set of measures would prove decisive.

==== Offensive ====
For this campaign, the Spaniards assembled three big divisions around Valencia de Alcántara. This time, unlike the two previous invasions, the Spaniards split their army in several corps, with each one attacking one target.

A Spanish force of 4,000 or 5,000 attempted to take Marvão with a frontal attack. The terrorized population pressed for surrender, but the firmness of Captain Brown prevailed and he opened fire against the attackers. The Spaniards were defeated with many losses and fled.

Another Spanish force of four squadrons attacked Ouguela (12 November 1762), whose walls were ruined. Its tiny garrison, formed by some armed irregulars and fifty riflemen, routed the enemy, who fled leaving many dead behind. The King of Portugal promoted Captain Brás de Carvalho and the other Ouguela's officers to a higher rank. The assault on Campo Maior also failed because the Spanish unit from Badajoz was not supported by the Spanish unit of Albuquerque. The latter fled to Spain when part of the Portuguese garrison of Campo Maior tried to intercept it.

==== Third retreat, second chase ====
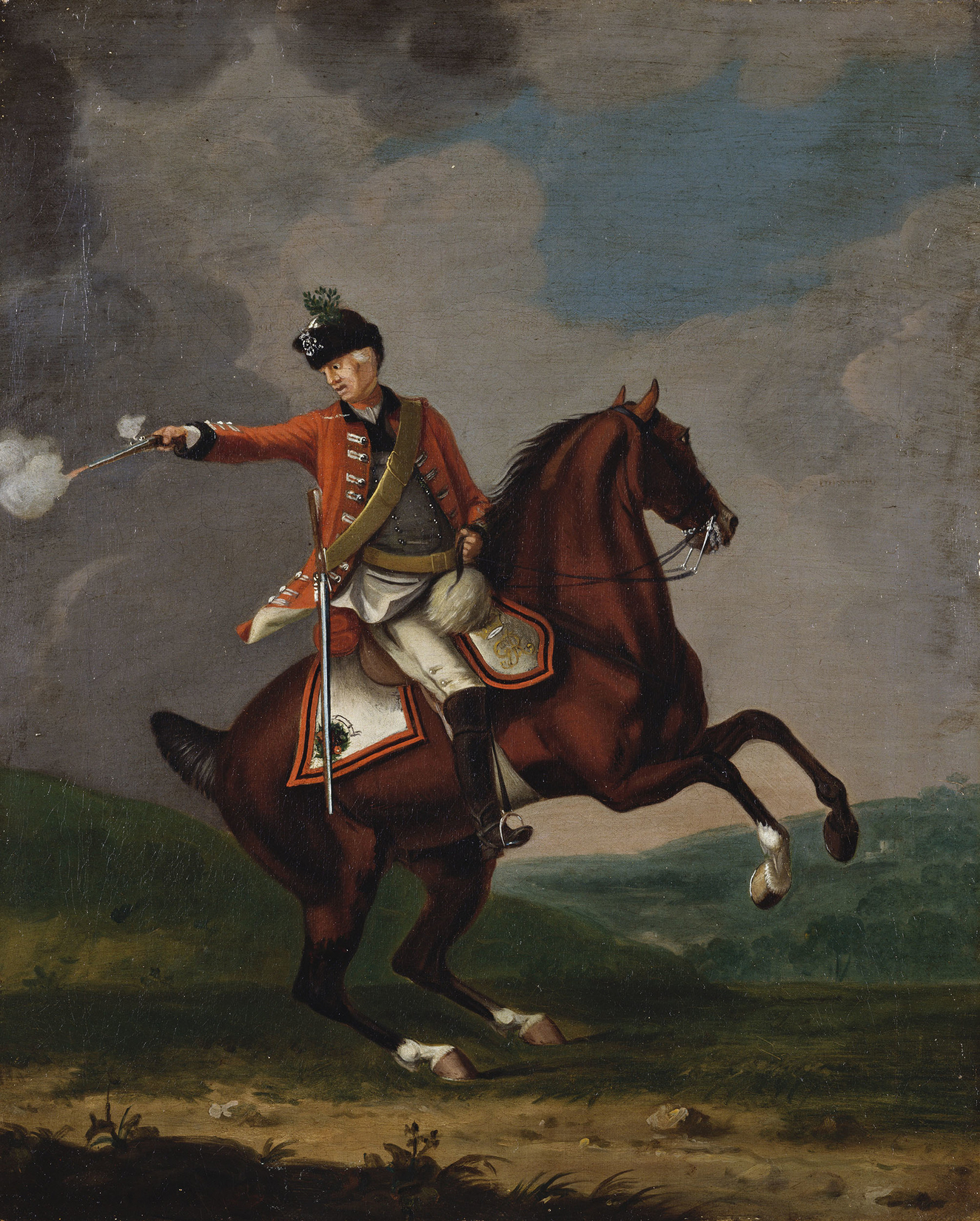
A private of the 16th Light Dragoons, which fought in the invasion. The British decisively stiffened the resistance of the Portuguese army: "The Count of Lippe, assisted by the energy of the Portuguese Minister, quickly formed the Portuguese troops into a disciplined army".

Eventually Lippe mobilized the entire allied army – finishing its winter quarters (12 November 1762) – and moving all units into south of the river Tagus (near Portalegre), as soon as news of the enemy's offensive became known.

The Spaniards were demoralized by these failures: during the two previous invasions not even one stronghold had resisted (a success rate of one hundred percent); while this time not even one fortress had been taken, giving the Portuguese time to assemble troops. The Portuguese army was now disciplined and well commanded. This renewed army – which initial unpopularity led some men to mutilate themselves to avoid conscription – saw their prestige and numbers skyrocket with volunteers. On the Contrary, the Franco-Spanish army was greatly diminished after the losses suffered during three failed invasions. Once again – for the third time – the Spanish army was compelled to retreat (15 November 1762) and for the second time, it was chased by Anglo-Portuguese detachments, which took many prisoners. A few more prisoners were even taken inside Spain, when the Portuguese garrison of Alegrete, led by colonel Wrey, made a successful raid on La Codosera (19 November).

==== Spain seeks a truce ====
On 22 November 1762, seven days after the beginning of the definitive Spanish retreat from Portugal, and three days after the Portuguese incursion in Spain (Codicera), the commander-in-chief of the Franco-Spanish army (Count of Aranda) sent Major-General Bucarelli to the Anglo-Portuguese headquarters at Monforte, with a Peace proposal: the suspension of hostilities. It was accepted and signed 9 days later, on 1 December 1762.

However, the Bourbon commander would try one last move to save his face: on the very same day Aranda sent a proposal to the Portuguese for the suspension of hostilities (22 November), he also sent a force of 4,000 men to seize the Portuguese town of Olivença. But the Spaniards withdrew as soon as they discovered that the garrison had just been reinforced shortly before. Lippe informed Aranda that such behaviour was odd for someone well-intentioned and eager for peace. (The Spanish commander answered that there had been an error of communication with the leader of that expedition).

A preliminary peace treaty had been signed at Fontainebleau, but the definitive treaty was only signed on 10 February 1763 in Paris, with the presence of the Portuguese representative, Martinho de Melo e Castro, among all the other. By this treaty, Spain was obliged to return to Portugal the small cities of Almeida and Chaves (in the Hispano-Portuguese frontier), and Colonia del Sacramento in South America (which had been taken to the Portuguese together with part of the Rio Grande do Sul in 1763), besides large concessions to the British: "The Spaniards, having failed the campaign of Portugal, had to return Colonia del Sacramento, renounce claims on their fishing rights in Newfoundland, recognize the legality of the British settlements on the coast of Honduras, cede Florida to England, and confirm all the privileges that British commerce held before the war started."

Meanwhile, Portugal also captured Spanish territories in South America (1763). The Portuguese won most of the valley of the Rio Negro, in the Amazon Basin, after dislodging the Spaniards from S. José de Marabitanas and S. Gabriel (1763), where they built two fortresses. The Portuguese, commanded by Rolim Moura, also successfully resisted a Spanish army sent from Santa Cruz de la Sierra (Bolívia) to dislodge them from the right bank of the Guaporé River (Fortress of S. Rosa or Conceição), the "gate" for the gold-rich Province of Mato Grosso (1763). The besieging Spanish army, reduced to less than half by disease, starvation and desertions, had to retreat, leaving the Portuguese in possession of the disputed territory and all its artillery (both the outcome and strategy resembling the misfortunes of the Spanish army in Portugal).

This way, the confrontation between Portugal and Spain in South America, during the Seven Years' War, ended in a tactical stalemate. However, while the Spaniards lost to the Portuguese nearly all the territory conquered during the conflict (Colonia do Sacramento was given back by treaty, and Rio Grande do Sul would be retaken from the Spanish army during the undeclared war of 1763–1777), Portugal retained all its conquests in the Rio Negro Valley (S. José de Marabitanas and S. Gabriel) and the Guapore's right bank (Mato Grosso). The only lands that Portugal conquered and returned to Spain were the territories of San Martin and San Miguel (whose Spanish property had always been recognized by the Portuguese).

== Aftermath ==
=== Reasons for Spanish failure ===
Spanish Prime Minister Manuel Godoy, Prince of the Peace (1767–1851), credited the Franco-Spanish defeat of 1762 mainly to the peasant uprising, caused by the excesses of the invaders: "The war of 62 alternated between defeats and disgraces; forty thousand Spanish soldiers and twelve thousands French only managed to take Almeida and penetrate some leagues inland, and then were defeated in the mountains with very little honour to the Spanish and French arms... the country was trampled, the people subjected to violence and repression. And the peasantry rebelled."

It was a war without formal battles, of marches and counter-marches, and so it is called the Fantastic War in Portuguese historiography. It represented a victory of strategy over numbers, since the Bourbon armies failed to reach all their stated goals and had to retreat, with huge casualties, before an advancing and inferior enemy, who chased them out of Portugal.

The mountainous nature of the terrain and the collapse of logistic lines, respectively, well used and caused by the allies, were determinant.

Eventually, the genius of Count Lippe, and the discipline of British troops, whose officers managed to reorganize the whole Portuguese army in record time while taking advantage of its bravery, (Note: A few years after the 1762 invasion, during the Peninsular War (1808–1814), the prestige of the Portuguese soldier remained: "There are countless comments from British officers praising the bravery, steadfastness and skill of their Portuguese comrades [the Duke of Wellington used to call them the 'fighting roosters' of his Anglo-Portuguese army and asked Portuguese troops to reinforce his army in Belgian, during the Waterloo campaign. The French who fought against them agreed. General Hugo and his son new, from experience, that the Portuguese line was capable of withstanding the attacks of the best French regiments. Later on Baron Marbot, Marshal Massena's ADC, concurred, adding that they had not been given proper credit for the part they played in the [Peninsular War]. (...)", in Chartrand, Rene The Portuguese Army of the Napoleonic Wars vol. 3, Osprey Publishing, New York, 2001, p. 41) explain a Portuguese victory that many observers considered impossible at the time:

"when Spain declared war against Portugal in 1762, the nominal [Portuguese] army consisted of 17,000 men... of which, not more than half could be mustered, and these without artillery or engineers. The talents of the German Count de La Lippe who commanded them, and the assistance of the British, enabled this force to resist the Spanish army, who retired at the close of the campaign, after sustaining considerable loss as well as from the regulars as the peasants".

— W. Bradford in Sketches of Military Costume in Spain and Portugal.

Most decisive of all were the hatred and resistance of rural populations to the foreign invader: "The Franco-Spanish army, commanded by Prince Beauvau and Count of Aranda, acted softly inside Portugal, who revolted against foreign invasion in the same way that Spain will do in 1808 [against Napoleon], and was aided in its resistance by a body of 8,000 British landed in Lisbon. [The invaders] had to retreat by the valley of the Tagus".

The Spaniards also made several errors, such as changing plans three times (the main objective being successively Porto, Lisbon, and Alentejo, during the three invasions) and replacing the army's commander at a critical moment. Their relationship with the French was poor: Aranda even wrote to the Spanish court, complaining of the atrocities committed by French troops against the Portuguese villages. In addition, the large Spanish fleet sent to America not only diverted resources and logistics from the army aimed to conquer Portugal, but also prevented Spain from attacking Portugal by sea.

Besides, the Bourbon numerical superiority was mainly apparent as they had to split their forces in order to sustain the conquered strongholds, look for food, chase the guerrillas, escort supply convoys from Spain, and build roads. The remaining troops available for main military operations were very few, starved, and demoralized.

=== Loss of Spanish prestige ===
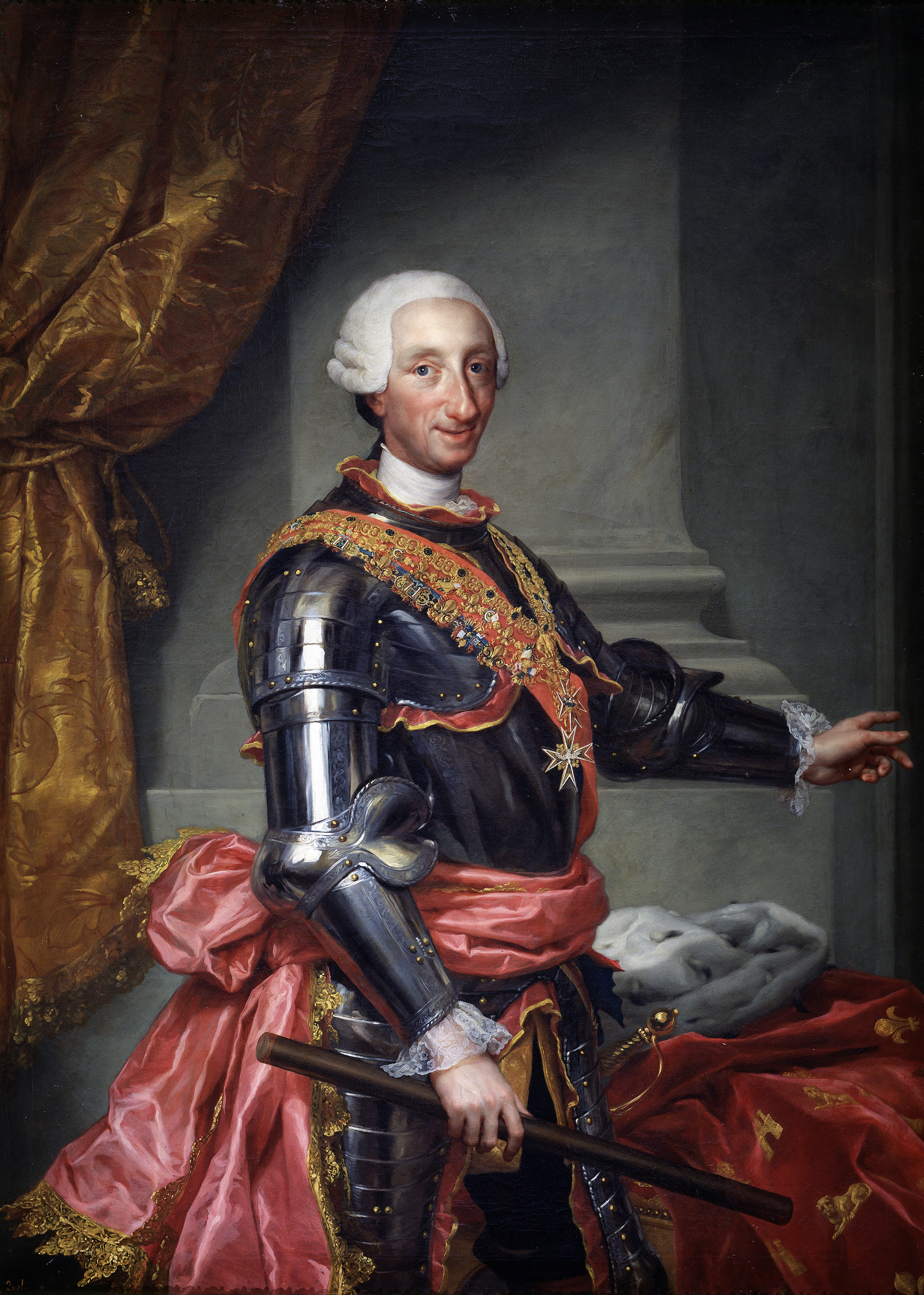
Charles III of Spain. He wrote to his Plenipotentiary Grimaldi during the peace negotiations in Paris, end of 1762: "I'd rather lose my dignity than to see my people suffer". It was during the invasion of Portugal -the main Spanish contribution to the Seven Years' War- that Spain suffered the highest human toll (around 25,000 soldiers). The surrender of Havana, represented 11,670 losses, including 5,000 of the garrison captured before being deported back to Spain.

According to several contemporaries, the huge human losses experienced by the Spaniards during the invasion of Portugal, contributed to discredit Spain:

- Contemporary General Dumouriez (French), 1766: "The preservation [independence] of Portugal cost Spain its glory, its treasure, and an army."
- Contemporary anonymous Spanish author, 1772: "...the discrediting and destruction of a splendid army in the last entry [invasion of Portugal], persuaded Europe that our power was more imaginary than real. With odious comparisons with what we [the Spaniards] were in other times." (in Military-Historical reflections on why Portugal remains independent of Spain and why our wars against it usually end in disgrace, which will continue until we take other dispositions. [in Spanish]).
- Contemporary Spanish Satire, mocking about the destruction of a Spanish army in Portugal and a navy in Cuba –in just 6 months:

"Through a Compact Family / the sword he drew / thus, it was believed that the world he was going to conquer. / But he sheathed his sword again / having lost a splendid army / an excellent navy, money and a lot of men / and his honor in Havana / in six months alone." (The invasion of Portugal took six months while the siege of Havana lasted two months).

- José Cornide (Spaniard), who went to Portugal in 1772 to study the reasons of the Franco-Spanish defeat, and elaborated a military report of that country: "The war against the Kingdom of Portugal...its bad outcome, and the loss of a considerable number of troops and even civilians... that were contaminated by the retreating troops (...). Merely in Galicia (about which I can speak with some knowledge) more than 60,000 people were lost as a consequence of the war of [17]62 ... whenever we adopt... the tactics of the war of 1762, the result will always be so disgraceful as then."
- Duke of Choiseul, French Foreign Minister, in a letter to king Louis XV: "It is not my fault ... that the Spaniards have made such an unbelievable campaign [in Portugal]." Apparently, he devalued French responsibility in the Franco-Spanish defeat.

Far from saving France from defeat, Spain shared it, and indeed made it worse. However, after the war Spain would commit to peace, embracing a successful process of reforms and modernization.

=== Trials in Spain ===
After the end of the Seven Years' War, there was a war council in Spain to judge the military leaders involved in the fall of Havana at British hands, mainly Juan de Prado y Portocarrero (governor of Cuba) and the Marquis of the Royal Transportation. The Count of Aranda was the President of this council. The punishments were generally very severe, and Aranda was particularly active asking inclusively the death sentence for the former Viceroy of Peru, Count of Superunda– whose only crime had been to be in the wrong place at the wrong time (he was returning to Spain after serving the Crown in Peru for 16 years, when he was caught in the Havana's siege).

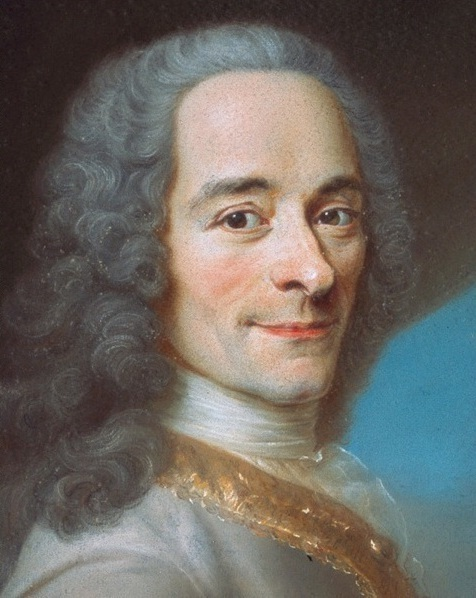
Portrait of Voltaire, who like other contemporary intellectuals, criticized the invasion of 1762. He attributed the Anglo-Portuguese victory over the Franco-Spaniards entirely to the genius of Count Lippe. He classified the Spanish Attempt of defeating Britain by invading Portugal, as "the greatest political stroke that modern history records". Adam Smith, in its turn, considered the invasion a biased economical tactic, since it was based on the premise that England would not survive without the gold of Portugal.

The devastating defeat caused great commotion in the Spanish public opinion, who demanded scapegoats. But, ironically, it would be the loser of the Portuguese campaign of 1762 who would judge the loser of Cuba. Spanish historian José de Urdañez pointed out that:

"as the best biographers of the Aragonese count [Aranda] have explained, 'under the cover of rigor, the material and moral failure that this war had been to Spain was camouflaged before the people.' (...). However, it was still amazing that the leader of the defeated army in Portugal was the fierce accuser of the defenders of Havana..."

— In Víctimas Ilustradas del Despotismo. El Conde de Superunda, Culpable y Reo, ante el Conde de Aranda .

=== Stalemate in South America ===
The Spanish invasion of Portugal in Europe which absorbed the lion's share of the Spanish war effort, also saw a resurgence of border skirmishes between the Portuguese colony of Brazil and adjacent Spanish territories that ended with a mixed result.

River Plate
the Spanish Cevallos expedition (3,900 men) was successful capturing the crucially placed River Plate Portuguese port town of Colónia do Sacramento (with 767 defenders), where 27 British merchantmen with their cargo loaded on board were captured in the harbour.

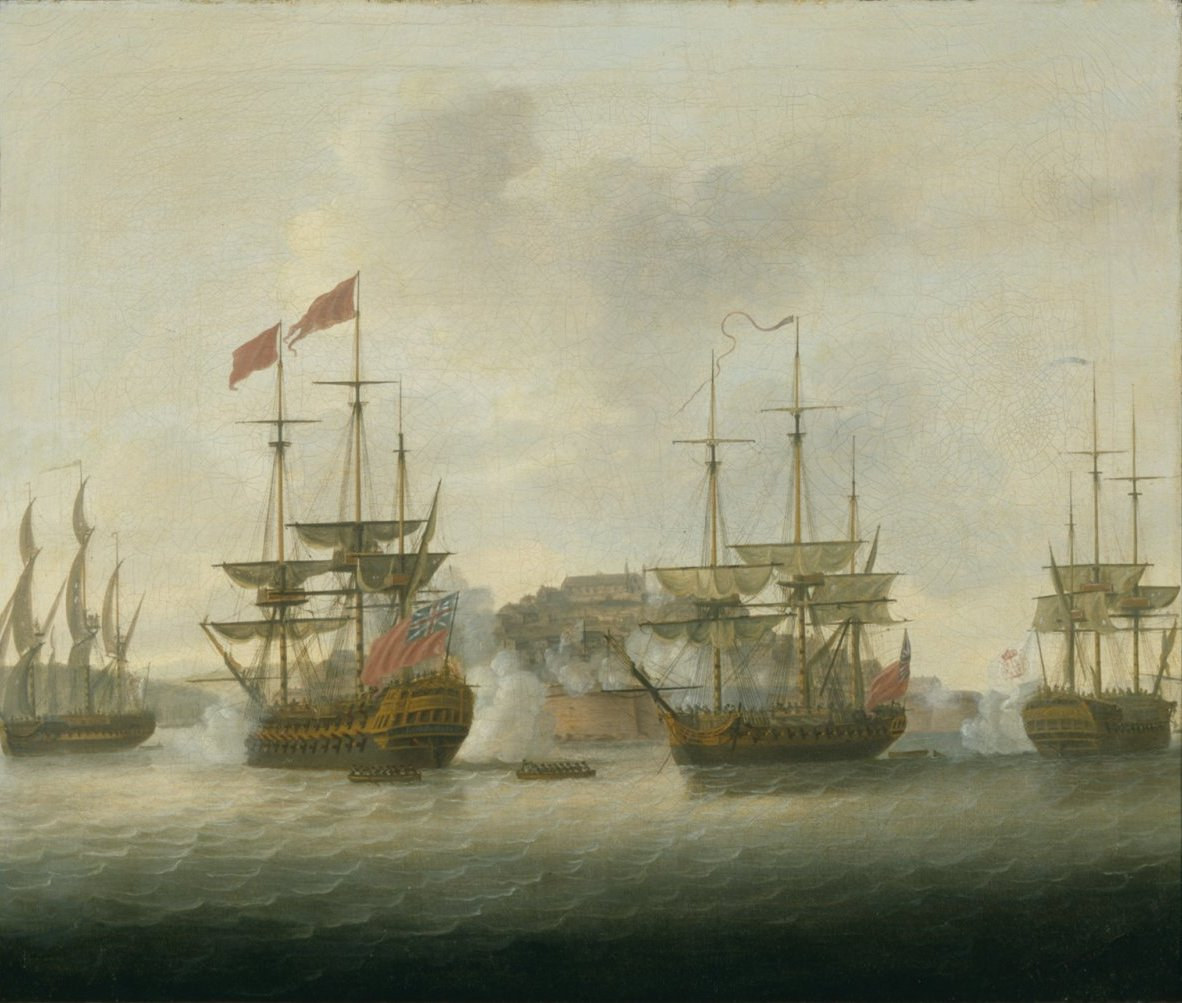
The Attack on Nova Colonia in the River Plate in 1763, under the command of Captain John Macnamara

When a small Company-Portuguese fleet under privateer John McNamara tried to retake Colonia do Sacramento in 1763, it was beaten off, with the East India Company losing one fourth-rate ship of the line, the Lord Clive along with another ship, the 40-gun Ambuscade suffering structural damage. The Portuguese frigate Gloria of 38 guns also suffered damage. The fleet retreated after the loss of their largest ship.

Cevallos also captured the fort of Santa Teresa (with 400 defenders) on 19 April 1763, and the little fort of San Miguel (with 30 defenders), on 23 April.

Rio Grande do Sul (South Brazil)
Cevallos advanced North with a Hispano-Indian army of 6,000 men and reached an even greater victory when he conquered most of the vast and rich territory of the so-called "Continent of S. Peter" (the present day Brazilian state of Rio Grande do Sul), where the Portuguese had only up to 1,000 men (soldiers and militia). São José do Norte and the capital –S. Pedro do Sul- were abandoned without a fight.

However, the Spaniards were defeated by the Portuguese at the Battle of Santa Bárbara (1 January 1763), when an invading army of 500 Spaniards and 2,000 Indians, in cooperation with Cevallos, tried to conquer Rio Pardo, almost the only remaining Portuguese territory in Rio Grande do Sul: seven cannons, 9,000 heads of cattle and 5,000 horses were captured. This huge territory would be completely retaken by the Portuguese during the so-called "deaf war" (1763–1777).

Rio Negro (Amazonia, North Brazil)
Portugal conquered the valley of the Rio Negro (1763), in the Amazon Basin, after dislodging the Spaniards from Marabitanas and San Gabriel (1763).

There they raised two fortresses, using Spanish cannons.

Mato Grosso (western Brazil)
the Portuguese, commanded by Rolim Moura, also successfully resisted a Spanish army sent from Santa Cruz de la Sierra (Bolívia) to dislodge them from the right bank of the Guaporé River (Fortress of S. Rosa or Conceição), the gate for the gold-rich Province of Mato Grosso (1763), which the Spanish crown intended to recover. The Portuguese not only used biological warfare (according to the Spanish commander, the Governor of Santa Cruz de la Sierra) but also captured and occupied – until the end of the war – the reductions of S. Miguel and S. Martin, which were main sources of Spanish supply and were located on the Spanish side of the river Guaporé (left bank). Thus the besieging Spanish army, reduced to less than half by disease, starvation and desertions, had to retreat, leaving the Portuguese in possession of the disputed territory and all its artillery. Rolim de Moura would be rewarded for his victory with the Viceroyalty of Brazil. A second Spanish attack 3 years after the end of the seven years' war, failed again (1766).

This way, if the confrontation between Portugal and Spain in South America, during the Seven Years' War, ended in a tactical stalemate, it represented also a Portuguese strategic victory in the short run: the Spaniards would lose to the Portuguese nearly all the territory they had conquered during the conflict (Colonia do Sacramento was given back by the treaty of Paris, which ended the war, and Rio Grande do Sul would be retaken from the Spanish army during the undeclared war of 1763–1777), while Portugal retained all its conquests in the Rio Negro Valley (S. José de Marabitanas and S. Gabriel) and the Guapore's right bank/Mato Grosso. The only lands that Portugal conquered and returned to Spain were the territories of San Martin and San Miguel missions (whose Spanish property had always been recognized by the Portuguese).

=== Invasion in literature ===
The Franco-Spanish invasion of Portugal is almost a forgotten episode in Portuguese History text books. And for Portuguese literature, it is like a blind spot (with a few exceptions: Hélia Correia's "Lillias Fraser" and Mário de Carvalho's "A paixão do conde de Fróis").

However, in English literature, there is at least a book on the subject: Absolute honour, whose hero is an Englishman (Jack Absolute) that lives adventures during the Bourbon invasion of Portugal in 1762. Naturally, and for understandable reasons, this campaign is also almost absent from Spanish literature. There is, nevertheless, a high qualified exception -the great Novelist and Dramaturge Benito Pérez Galdós, who wrote a tale about the battle of Bailén, where a personage, D. Santiago Fernández, describes sarcastically his participation in the campaign of 1762, fiercely defending his master, the marquis of Sarria: "... There was no other Sarria born after Alexander the Macedonian (...). That was a great campaign, yes sir; we entered Portugal, and although we had to withdraw shortly after, because the English appeared before us (...). The Marquis of Sarria was a supporter of the Prussian tactic, which is to be quiet and wait for the enemy to advance wildly, thus rapidly being tired and defeated. In the first battle fought with the Portuguese villagers, everyone began to run when they saw us, and the general ordered the cavalry to take possession of a herd of sheep, which was achieved without bloodshed."
