= Battle of Marvão =

1762 battle of the Seven Years' War

- Part of the Spanish invasion of Portugal
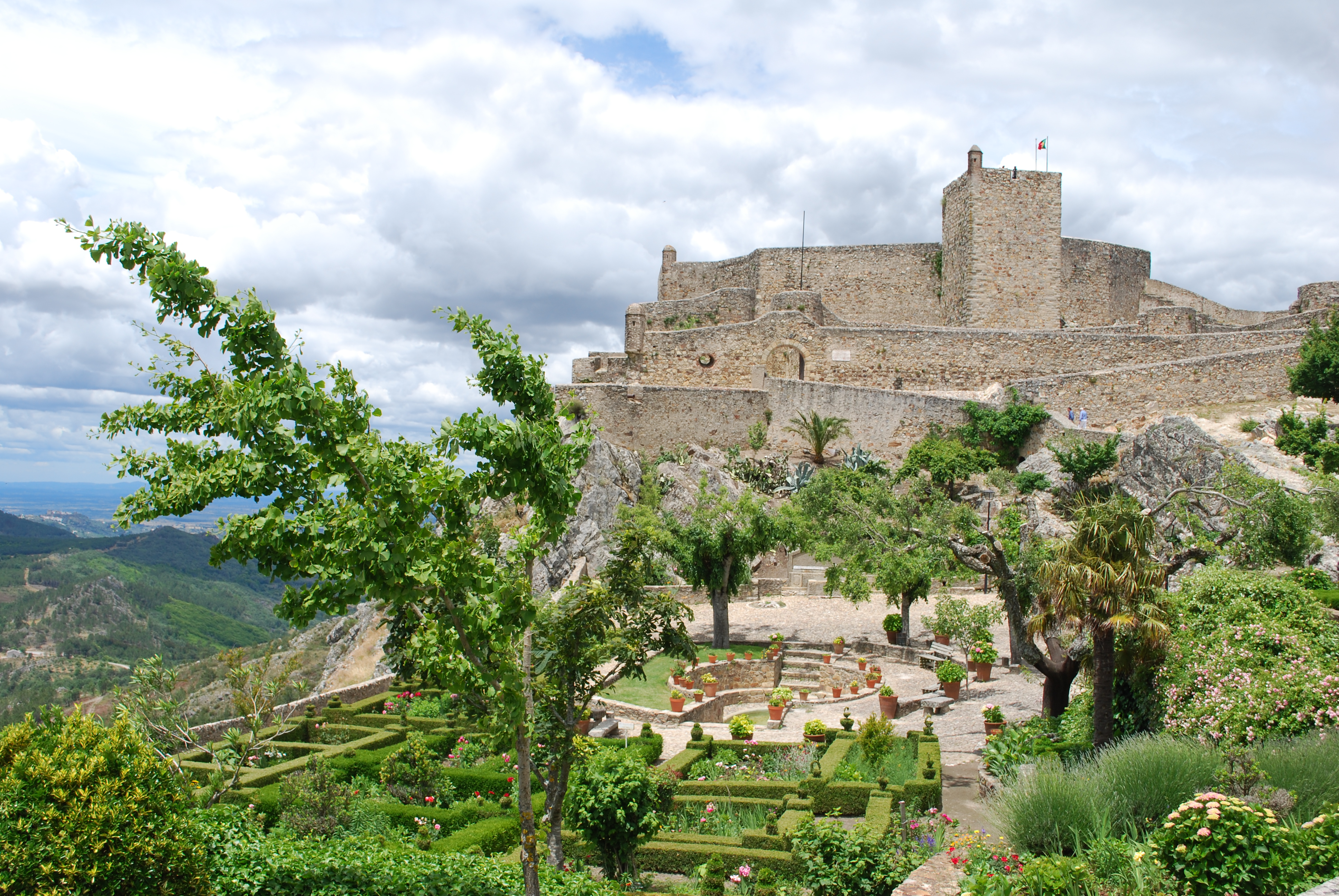
- Castelo de Marvão
Date	9–10 November 1762
Location	Marvão, Portugal 39°23′40.3″N 7°22′35.6″W
Result	Anglo-Portuguese victory

Belligerents
Great Britain; Portugal	Spain

Commanders and leaders
Thomas Browne	Unknown

Strength
500	4,000

Casualties and losses
Light	Heavy

The Battle of Marvão was a military action that took place during the Fantastic War and the Anglo-Spanish War and was part of the attempted Spanish and French invasion of Portugal in late 1762. A sizeable Spanish force attacked the castle town of Marvão but was repelled and defeated by an Anglo-Portuguese force under the command of Captain Thomas Browne.

== Events ==
=== Background ===
Two Spanish offensives aimed to overrun Portugal had failed during the summer of 1762. Around the same time Spain received the support of France with 10,000 troops and equipment while Britain had sent reinforcements to aid the Portuguese; in total around 8,000 men led by John Burgoyne and General George Townshend. The third invasion of Portuguese territory was stimulated by the peace negotiations between France and Great Britain. Spain's position and bargaining power during the peace talks would be reinforced with a surprise attack in late autumn (campaigns were held off until Spring generally at this time). However, the commander in Portugal, Count Lippe, had already reinforced essential garrisons with British troops and officers and first-line Portuguese troops.

The Spanish split their army into several corps, each attacking a specific target. Marvão was one the Spanish hoped to seize and hold.

=== Battle ===
The Castle of Marvão, which sat on a granite crag of the Serra de São Mamede near the Tagus on the frontier, was a critical dominant feature which was vital to take to make the Spanish crossing of the Tagus easier. The castle itself was defended by 500 men under Captain Thomas Browne who was in charge of a company of Colonel Bigoe Armstrong's 83rd Regiment of foot with a small detachment of Portuguese troops, militia and some cannon.

As the Spanish corps strength of 4000 to 5000 men approached the area, the terrorized population pressed for surrender, but the firmness of Captain Browne prevailed, who was at first expecting a long siege. He was surprised when the Spanish attacked giving the nature of the fortification's high defensive position.

The Spanish attempted to move up via the straightforward approach of the southeast side of Marvão; Brown then sent reinforcements from the central citadel to that side. The British and Portuguese opened fire with muskets and cannons against the Spanish assailants who tried to throw themselves up against the walls. To compound problems many of the Spanish scaling ladders were too short to mount the walls, and they were easily repelled with heavy losses; the Spanish lost many men to accidents as well as cannon and musket fire. The Spanish commander, realizing the surprise was lost and the castle being well defended, called off the attack; he was not prepared for a siege and retreated the next day.

=== Aftermath ===
The other Spanish advance was halted at Ouguela (another small fort), but the Portuguese garrison was equally prepared there. The Spanish were driven before the place with considerable losses and obliged to abandon the attempt.

On 19 November, both garrisons retaliated, joined forces, and raided and held the Spanish town of La Codosera. The resistance that the Spaniards met with in these small places had a visible effect upon their movements and convinced them that any attempt upon the Alentejo would require a decisive victory. The lateness of the season in some measure contributed to this, and disease was taking a huge toll, as well as the lack of supplies.

On 15 November, the Spanish force retreated; on 22 November, Spain asked for a truce.

== See also ==
- Great Britain in the Seven Years' War
- Battle of Ouguela
