= Battle of Ouguela =

1762 battle of the Seven Years' War

- Part of the Spanish invasion of Portugal
- Defence of Ouguela by Alfredo Roque Gameiro
Date	19 November 1762
Location	Ouguela, Portugal 39°04′44″N 7°01′51″W
Result	Portuguese victory

Belligerents
Portugal	Spain

Commanders and leaders
Brás de Carvalho	Unknown

Strength
50 riflemen Ouguela residents	Unknown

Casualties and losses
Unknown	Unknown

The Battle of Ouguela was a military operation of the Fantastic War, and it took place on 19 November 1762 when a Spanish force attempted to capture Ouguela, then defended by cavalry captain Brás de Carvalho and a small garrison.

After two failed attempts to occupy the country, Spain carried out a third invasion of Portugal through Alentejo, in Marvão and Ouguela. The Spanish were repelled in Marvão and then attempted to capture Ouguela. The village was defended by only 50 riflemen from the garrison of Campo Maior and civilians. The Spanish attack was fierce, but the spirited resistance led by captain Brás de Carvalho forced the Spanish to abandon the attack and retreat.

Shortly after the attacks on Marvão and Ouguela, the Spanish withdrew from Portugal, retaining Almeida and Chaves, however. The resistance the Spanish encountered in Marvão and Ouguela had an impact on their invasion plans and movements. On 1 December, an armistice was signed between Portugal and Spain, which later returned the cities still in its possession under the Treaty of Paris.

== See also ==
- Battle of Marvão
- Battle of Valencia de Alcántara
- Seven Years' War
