= La Codosera =

- municipality
- Coat of arms

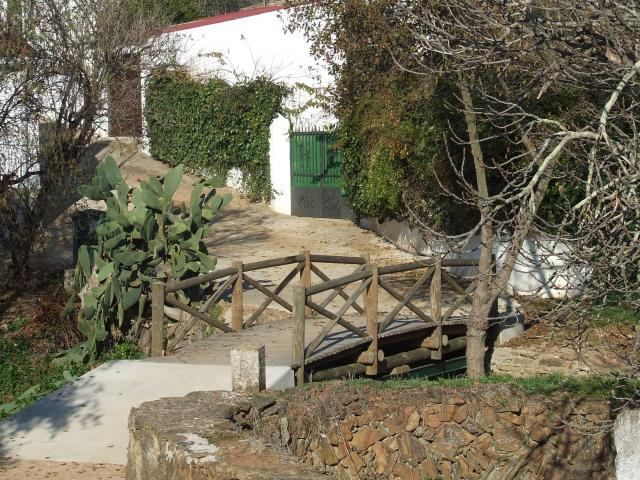
- The smallest international bridge in the world

- Location of La Codosera within Extremadura
- Coordinates: 39°12′31″N 7°10′24″W
- Country: Spain
- Autonomous community: Extremadura
- Province: Badajoz
- Municipality: La Codosera

Area
  - Total: 69 km^{2} (27 sq mi)
- Elevation: 355 m (1,165 ft)

Population (2025-01-01)
  - Total: 1,983
  - Density: 29/km^{2} (74/sq mi)
- Time zone: UTC+1 (CET)
  - Summer (DST): UTC+2 (CEST)

La Codosera (A Codesseira, in Portuguese) is a municipality located in the province of Badajoz, Extremadura, Spain. According to the 2006 census (INE), the municipality has a population of 2,269 inhabitants. It is located close to the international border with Portugal at the eastern end of the Serra de São Mamede.

The highest point in the municipal term is 596 m high La Lamparona.

It is most commonly known as the seat of the Sanctuary of Chandavila, a popular Catholic pilgrimage shrine, famous for the Marian apparitions of Our Lady of Sorrows said to have occurred in 1945 to Marcelina Barroso Expósito and Afra Brígido Blanco.

== Villages ==
La Codosera includes the following villages within its municipal term:

- El Marco
- La Tojera
- La Rabaza
- Bacoco

== See also ==
- List of municipalities in Badajoz
