= Castle of Marvão =

Medieval castle in Marvão, Portugal

- Castelo de Marvão
- Portalegre, Alto Alentejo, Alentejo in Portugal
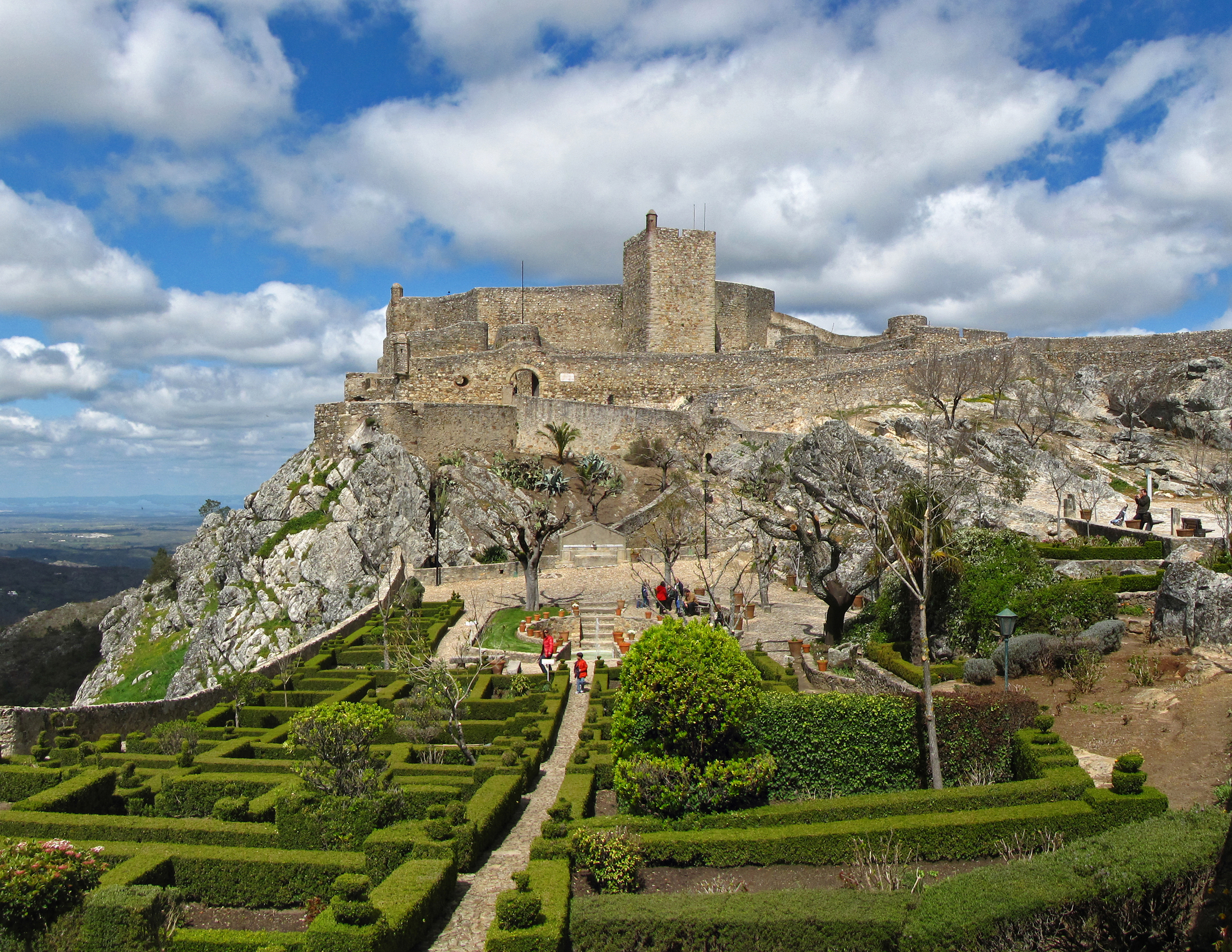
- A view of the main Castle of Marvão, with keep tower, as seen from the garden alongside the Church

Site information
- Type: Castle
- Owner: Portuguese Republic
- Operator: Câmara Municipal de Marvão/Centro Cultural de Marvão
- Open to the public: Public

Location
- Location of the castle within the municipality of Marvão
- Coordinates: 39°23′40.3″N 7°22′35.6″W

Site history
- Built: 8th century
- Materials: Masonry stone, Limestone plaster, Granite, Quartzite, Schist, Tile

The Castle of Marvão (Portuguese: Castelo de Marvão) is a well-preserved medieval castle located in the civil parish of Santa Maria de Marvão, in the municipality of Marvão, Portuguese district of Portalegre.

== History ==
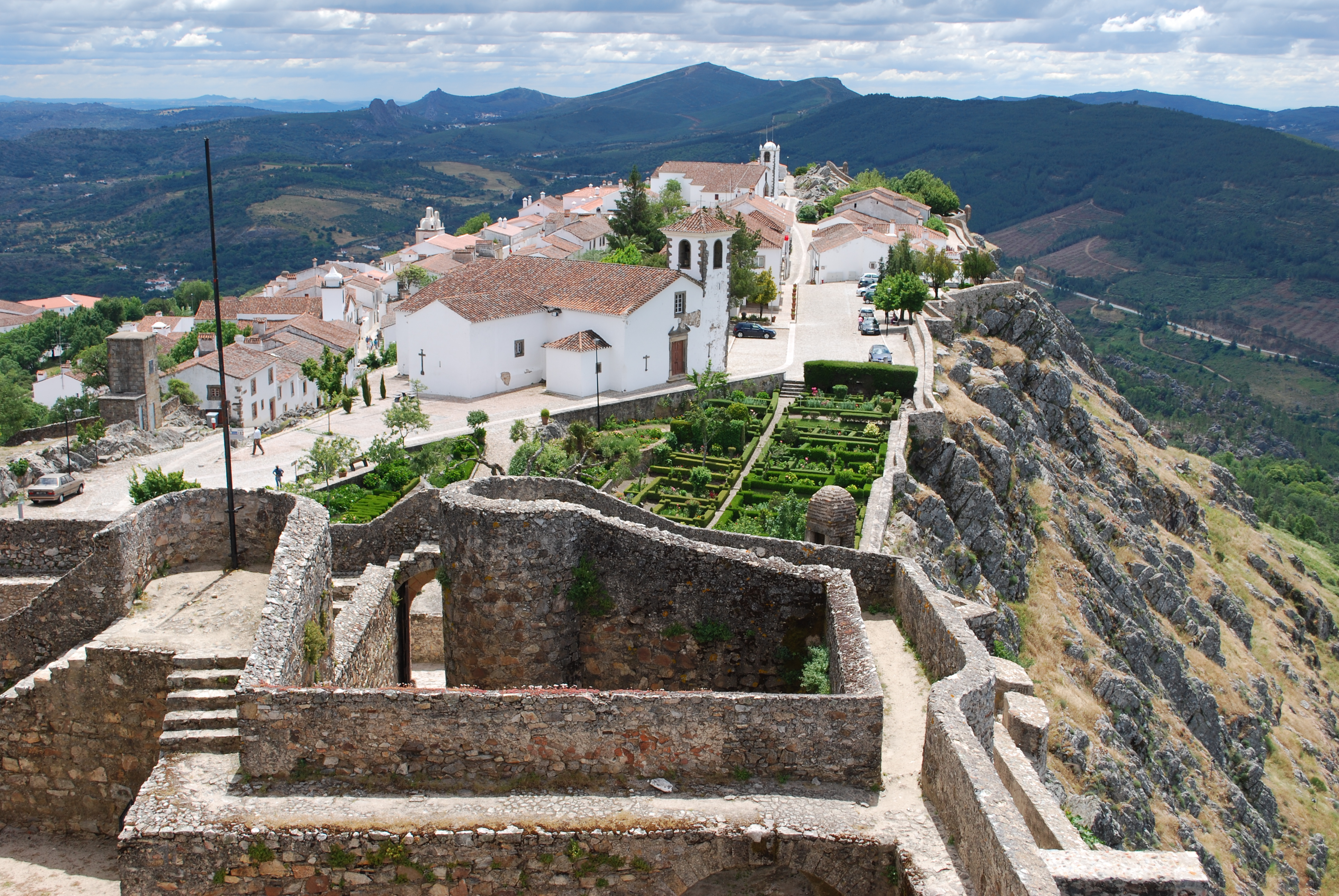
A view towards the west showing the main settlement and residences on the hilltop

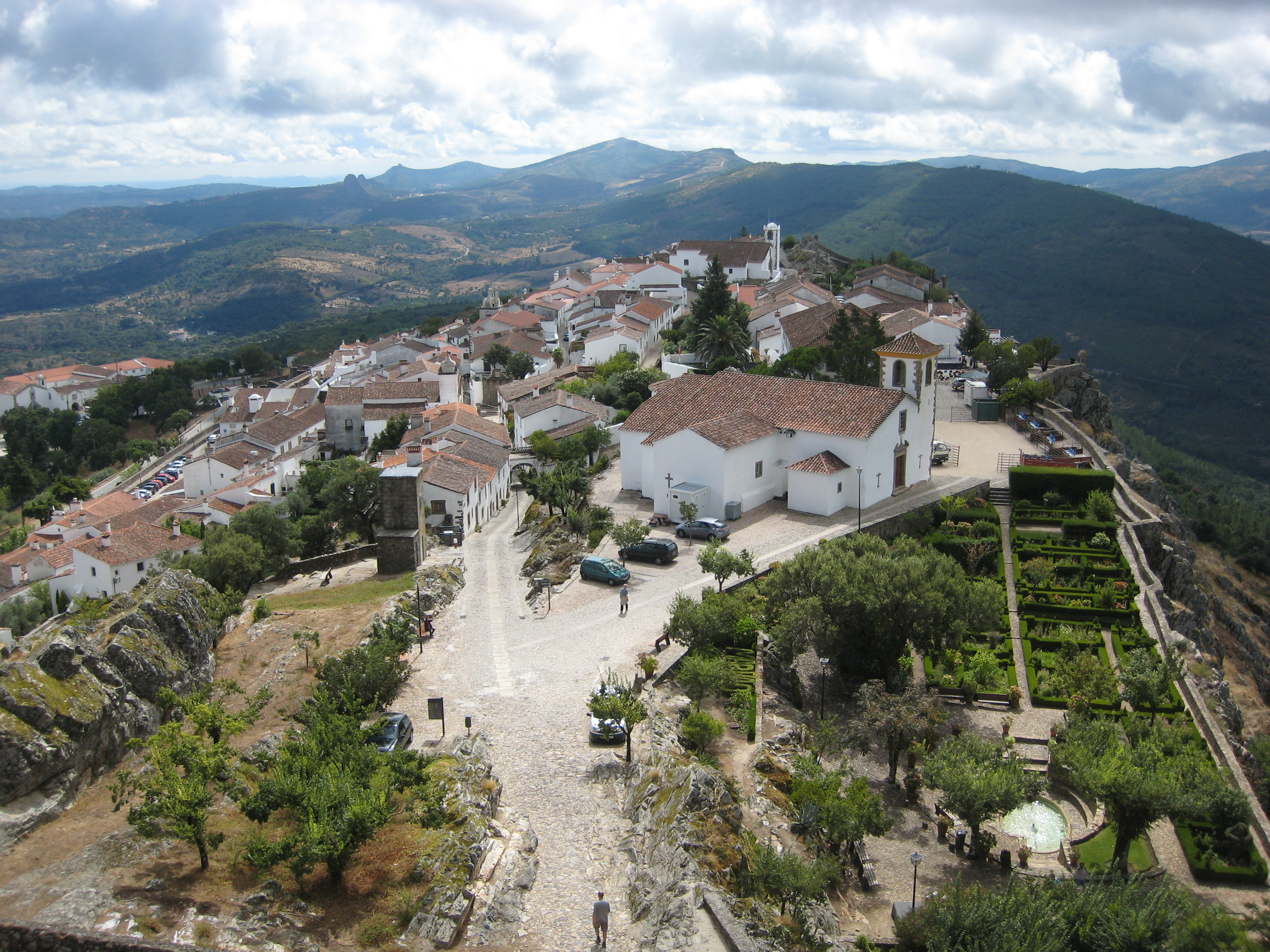
The northern part of the castle-town, showing the Church of Santa Maria

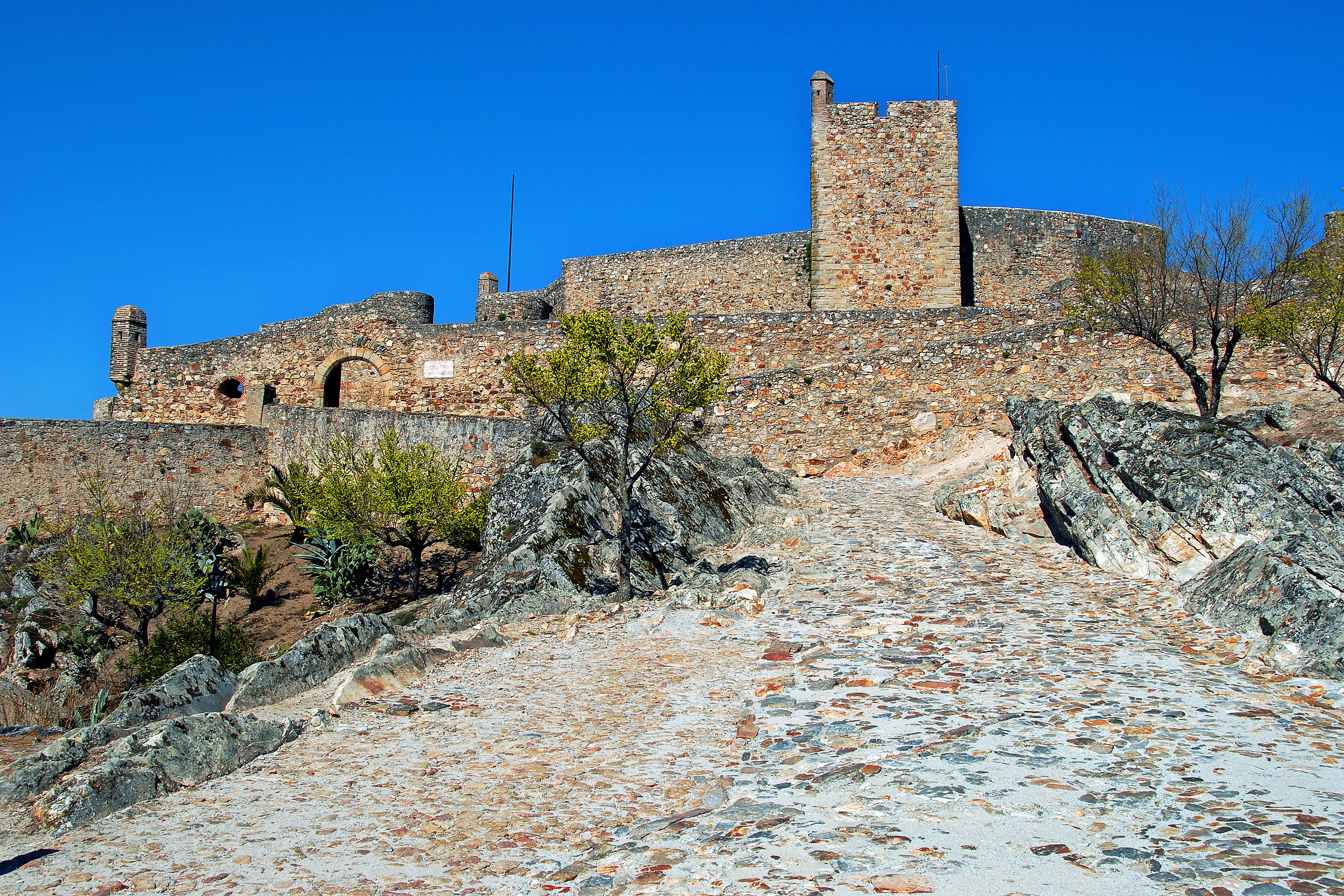
The passage to the main gate

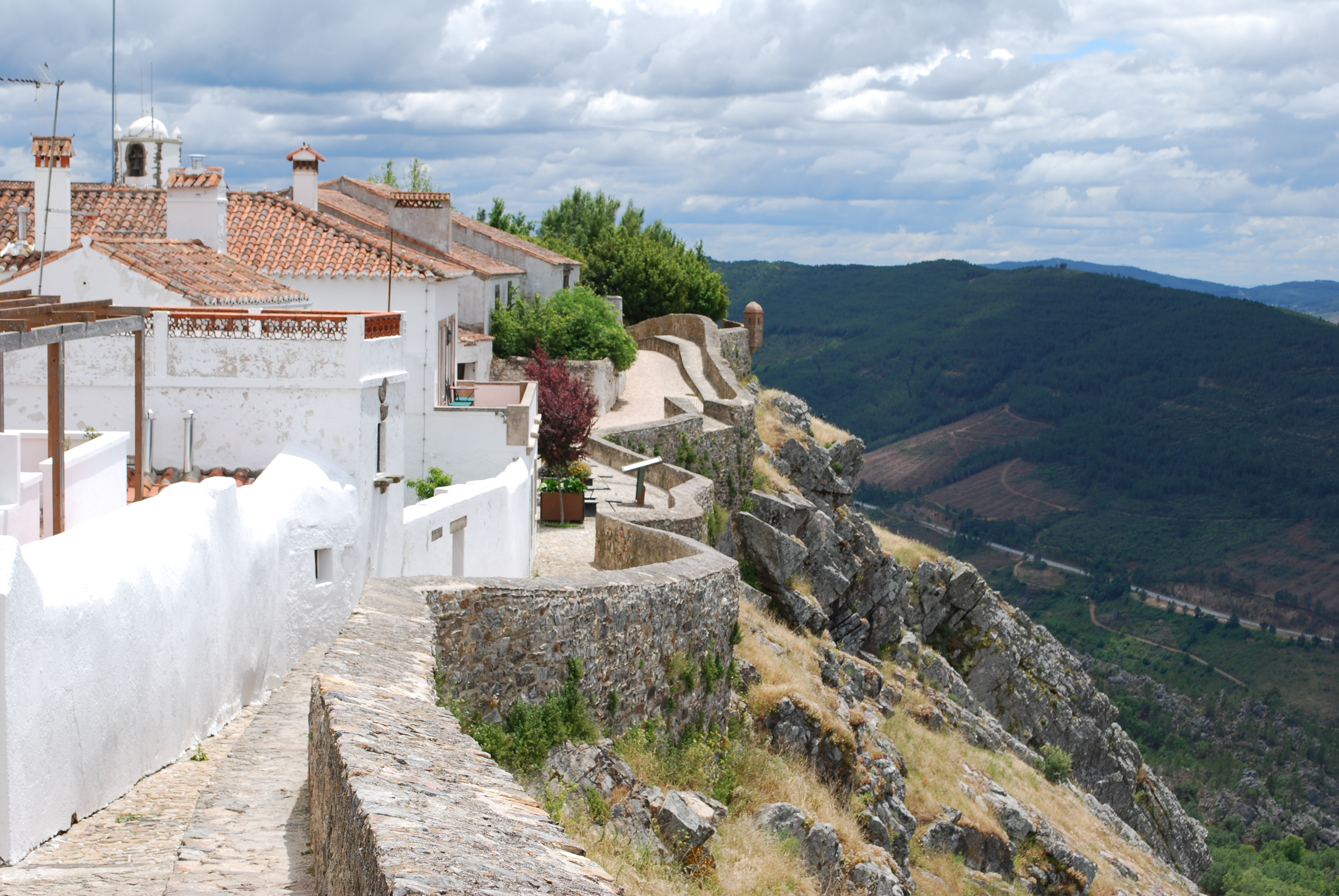
A view of the hilltop homes and narrow alleys that cross the settlement

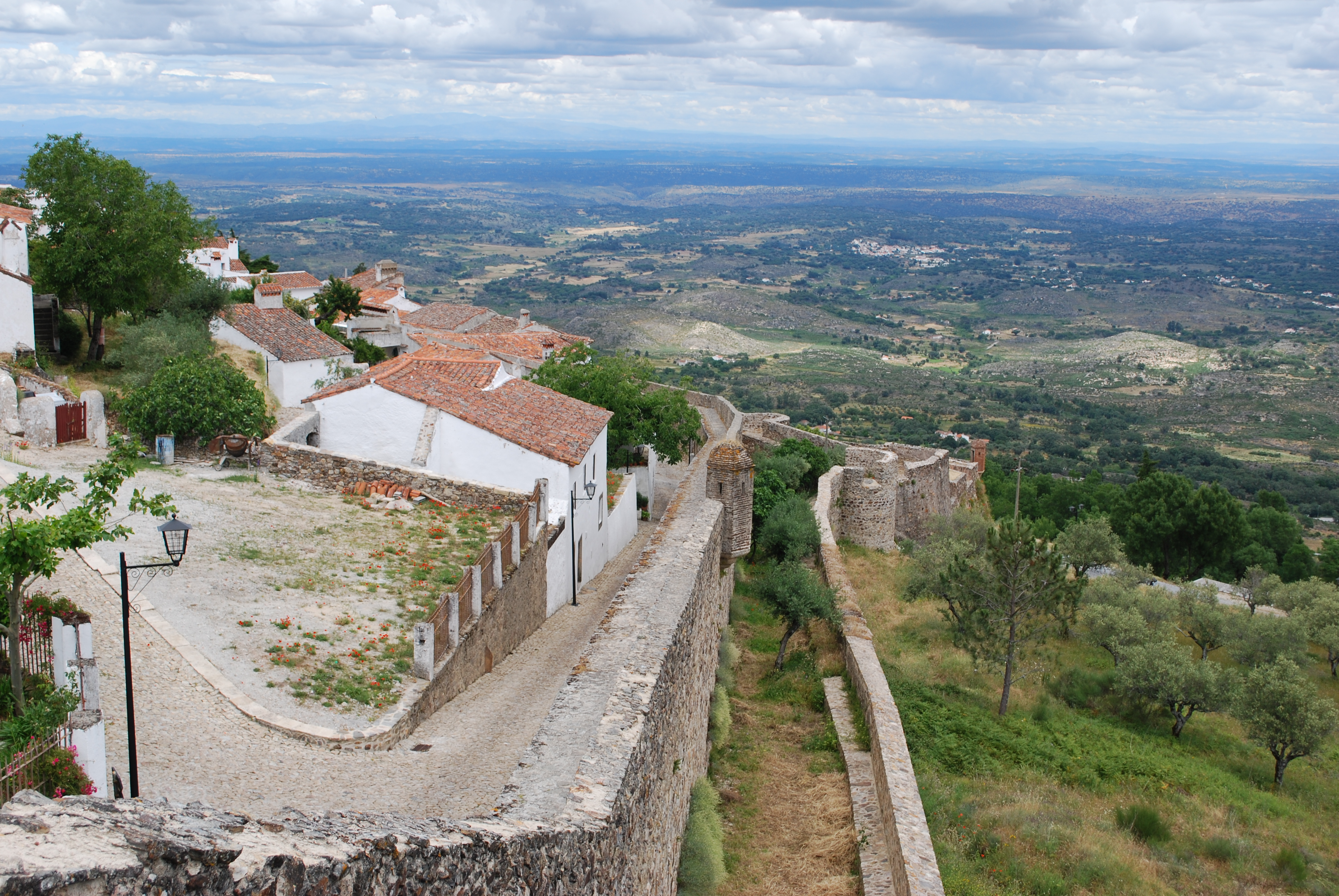
One of the hard bends up the castle used to hinder and access the clifftop fortification

Little is known about when the first peoples settled in the area of Marvão, but Roman forces began to appear in the region, following the strategic road linking it with Cáceres Santarém and bridge over the River Sever.

During the early Middle Ages, the Swabians, Visigoths and eventually the Umayyad Arabs began to settle in the area. The construction of the castle at Marvão was attributed to 9th century Islamic knight, Ibn Marwan, who began to dwell in the castle between 876 and 877. By the beginning of the 10th century, the settlement was designated Amaia de Ibn Maruán or, alternately, the fortress of Amaia. Christian forces loyal to King D. Afonso I (1112–1185) conquered the region and town from Moorish forces sometime between 1160 and 1166.

With the demarcation of Castelo Branco in 1214, Marvão was already included within Portuguese territory. The first foral (charter) was issued in 1226 by King D. Sancho II (1223–1248), done to ensure the development of the unpopulated outpost, against repeated attacks from the Kingdom of Castile. The castle briefly fell into Almohad hands in the 1190s.

Within the next few years, King D. Afonso III donated the fortified settlement to the Order of Malta (1271), later awarded to his son, D. Afonso Sanches, along with landlords of the castles in Arronches, Vide and Portalegre. For this reason, at the beginning the reign of King D. Dinis (1279–1325), the village and its castle found themselves involved in the dispute between the sovereign and D. Afonso, and was conquered by the forces of the sovereign in 1299. At the end of these events, the fields of Marvão, Portalegre and Arronches were exchanged for those in Sintra and Ourém, becoming regal possessions/property by 1300. D. Dinis issued a new foral, and undertook the expansion and strengthening of defenses, resulting in the construction of the keep.

During the reign of Ferdinand I of Portugal (1367–1383), the king established Marvão for a place of sanctuary (1378). His death immediately sparked the 1383-1385 Portuguese succession crisis, and was included in the possessions of the Order of Avis. The new sovereign and his successors granted many privileges to the village in 1407, 1436 and 1497 aimed at increasing its settlement and defense. At that stage, they have also proceeded to increase the reinforcements to the walls, with turrets dating back to the fifteenth and sixteenth centuries. In the successive years (1407, 1436 and 1497) various privileges were bestowed on the village in order to expand settlement.

Between 15th and 16th century, the fortifications were reinforced, as evidenced by the corbels.

The castle saw further construction and remodeling in the 17th, 18th and 19th century, reinforcing the bastions. Between 1640 and 1662, during the Restoration War, the castle were repaired, including alterations to the line of walls, gates and barbicans that were in state of ruins, as well as necessary repairs to the town's defenses. From a report by Nicolau de Langres, the infantry garrison and cavalry left the castle of Castelo de Vide for Marvão, resulting in a complement of 400. This concentration made the castle the primary line of defense. In 1641, Spanish forces attacked the fortress at Marvão, followed by a second wave in 1648. Repairs to the walls were undertaken in 1662, to remediate the damaged caused during the Restoration Wars, under the direction of Luís Serrão Pimentel.

Between 1704 and 1705, the fortress was taken by Spanish forces, but surrendered to Portuguese forces under the command of the Count of São João. Later in 1772, Spanish forces assaulted the fortress.

The beginning of the Peninsular Wars saw Jean-Andoche Junot's French corps intercede with the support of their Spanish allies, but in 1808, the military square was liberated.

Similarly, on December 12, 1833, Marvão was taken by Liberal forces. Within the year, the settlement was besieged by Miguel Ricardo de Álava's forces.

In 1938, the DGMEN Direcção Geral dos Edifícios e Monumentos Nacionais (Directorate General for Buildings and National Monuments) began working on repairing the walls, staircases and battlements. In proceeding years there were other projects to improve the condition of the castle that included: the walls, ceilings, tile and doors in 1947; the renovation of the Roman ceilings and plastering of the interior placements, repair of the walls, arched doorways, pavement, stone sill and exterior door in 1952; reconstruction of the walls and base of the cornerstones in 1957; demolition of the battlements along the castle, repair of other walls, bartizans, gates and painting of the artillery pieces in 1958.

On 21 October 1960, the castle was included in the Special Protection Zone and Non ædificandi zone, which was later revoked in 1962. The following year, repairs to the museum ceiling and other dependencies of the castle, construction of the roadway around the castle and a staircase to the tower keep terrace was undertaken. Other repairs continued in 1962, that included to the walls, ceilings and gates. This projects conditioned in the successive years with projects to clean, reinforce and repair the walls and other aspects of the fortification.

The castle was illuminated in 1994, and in 1995, the buildings in the square, the walls and exterior spaces were repaired or improved. The southern barbican was destroyed in 1997, near the children's garden park, but was re-constructed between 1998 and 1999.

In 2002, the general plan to repair nine parts of the structure was initiated under direction of DREMS. The following year, a tender by DGMEN was issued to complete repairs in the castle. This project benefited the walls and the path towards the bartizan over the Vila Gate and was extended to the tower. Reclamation of the hearth and guardhouse was also included in these tasks. A similar tender was issued in March 2004 by the municipal government to improve the site's illumination, which included improvements to the electrical system and telephone network, in addition to the construction of a de-mountable stage. This was later expanded between 2005 and 2006, under the pretext of program of ant-vandalism, the public illumination was improved.

In 2013, the Centro Cultural de Marvão (Cultural Centre of Marvão) received the concession to manage and operate the Marvão castle.

== Architecture ==
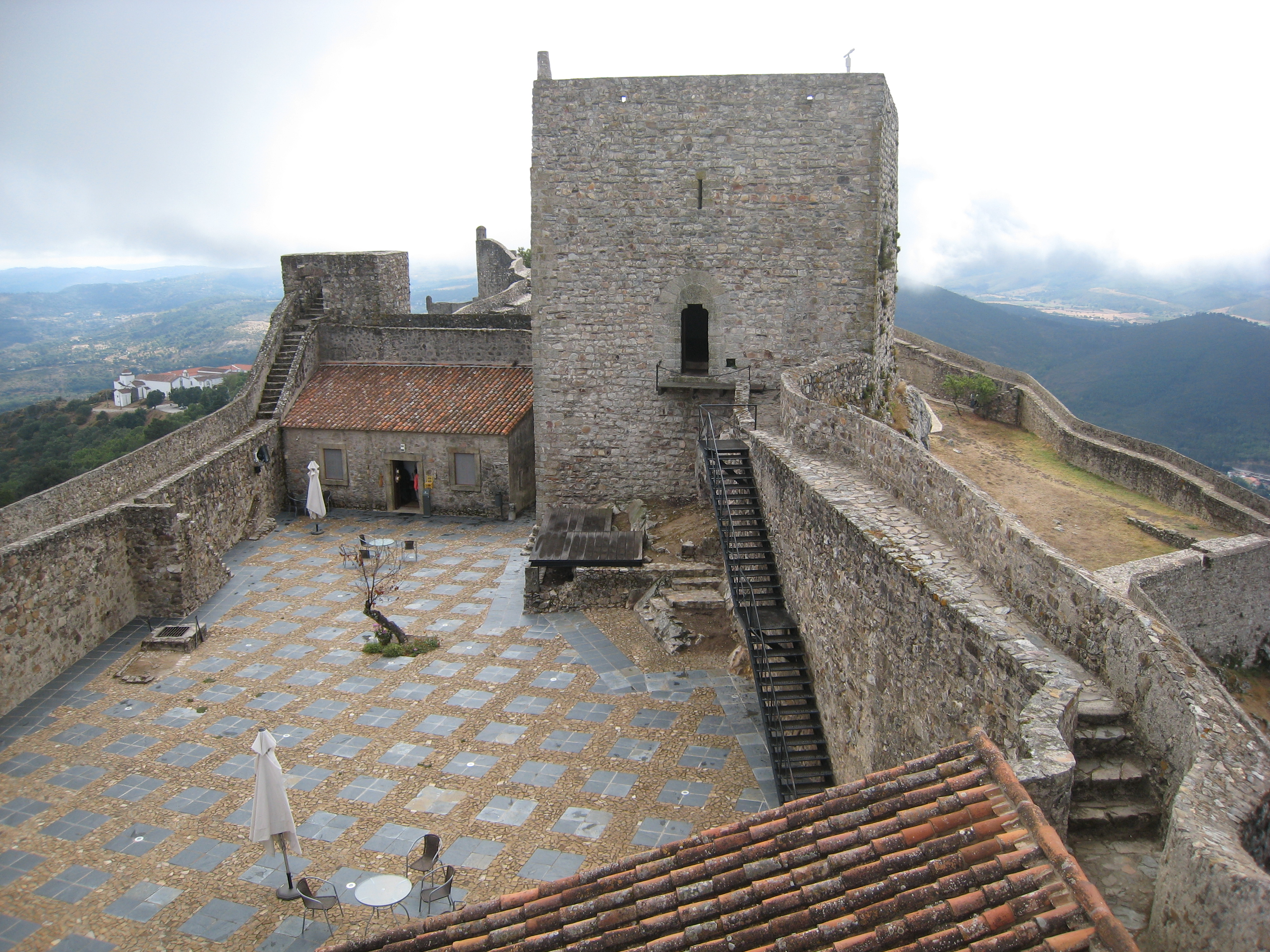
The interior of the castle showing the keep and interior battlements

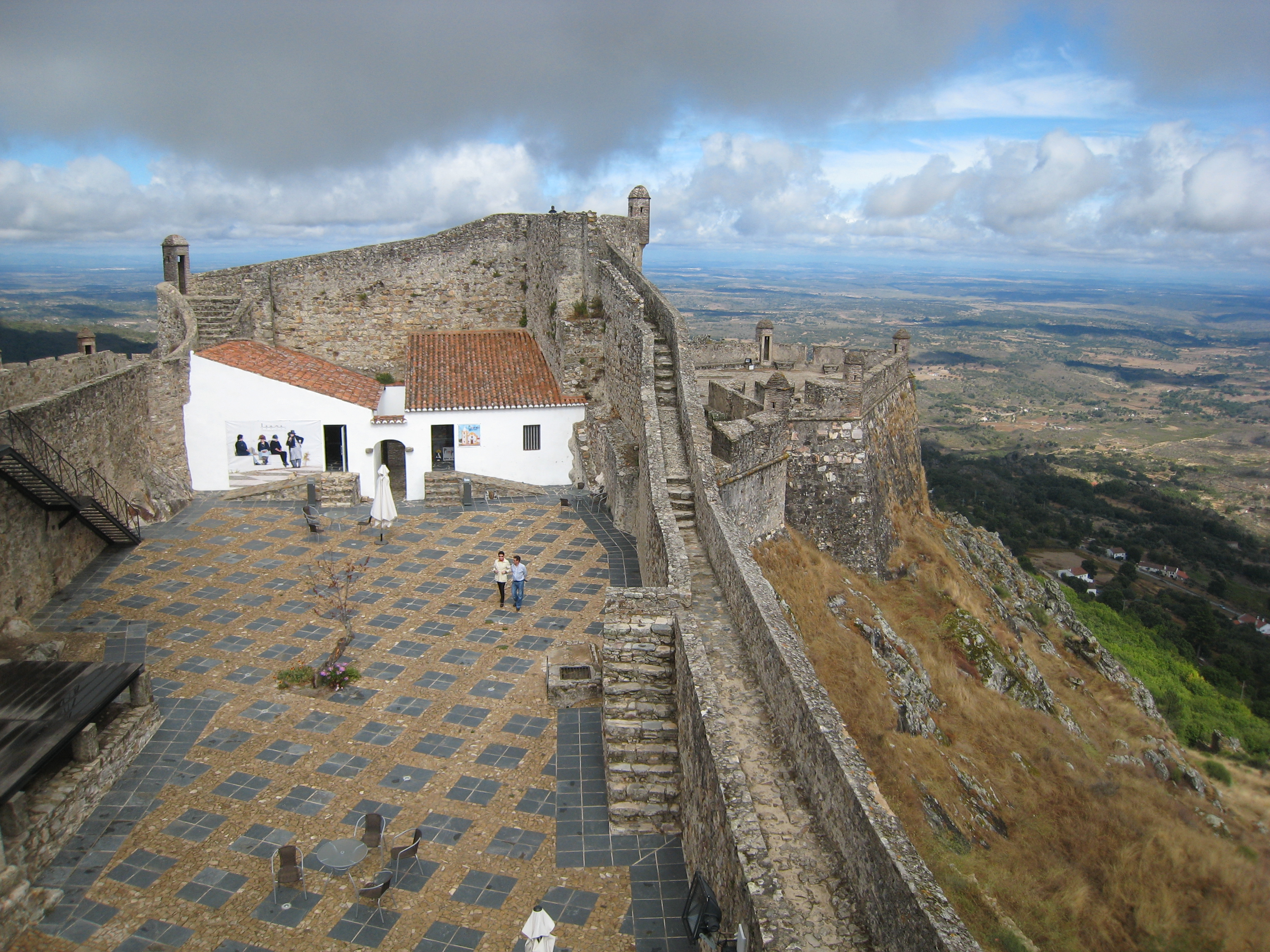
The eastern edge of the fortifications including cafe and concession

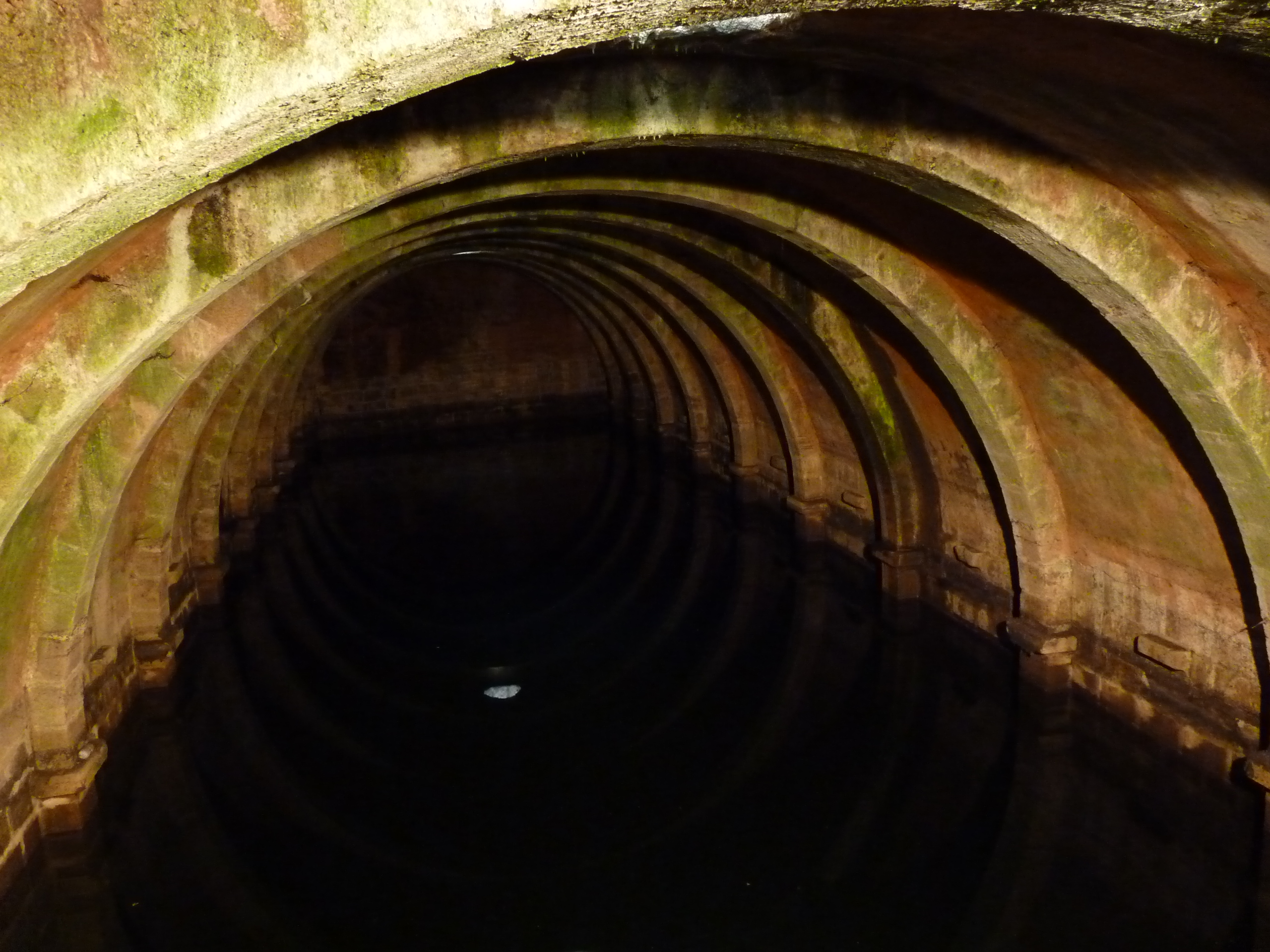
A view of the cavernous cistern used to support the castle and settlement under siege

The rural castle crowns the quartzite clifftops of a hilltop that is 867 metres (2,844 ft) at its highest point, at the keep tower. The sites walls enclose the totality of the urban agglomeration of Marvão.

The castle has two encircled courtyards. The main courtyard is situated in the northwest, and includes a cistern, two towers and corbel. The primitive, rectangular keep tower is situated in the southern angle with cracks, that includes a rounded gate with smooth, tympanum over concave sill. The only hall in the tower has a vaulted ceiling with ribs that allows access to the battlements. All the towers include battlements and inclined parapets. The first courtyard of the castle includes three, one-storey buildings with slits for handheld arms and covered in tiles, representing the old bunkers and armories. The southeastern courtyard includes garrison hearth and, opposite it, former military buildings. Near the entrance to the second enclosure is the large cistern. This large entrance door provides access to small area through an arched door; the gate provides access to a staircase with a rectangular lintel, supported by concave posts.

The medieval castle post-dates the year 1299, and features numerous characteristic features of a crusader-era castle. These include a tall central keep with raised entrance on the first floor; a series of lower, outlying turrets (some semi-circular); high-placed arrow-slits; and open spaces to aid the sheltering and assembly of villagers and troops. Additionally, there is a huge rain-collecting cistern to supply water to both the keep and wider castle in the event of siege. The rectangular cistern includes a vaulted ceiling supported by ten stone ribs. Rainwater was collected in a reservoir above the vault and channeled to the interior of the cistern by three openings, which are covered today. Water also collected through another access in the northwest.

There are a number of bent entrances (both from the village and castle gates) to slow down invaders in the event they breached the gates. A series of narrow "killing zones," notably, in the triple gate on the village-side of the castle, extensive crenellated battlements and curtain walls also enhance the natural defensibility of Marvão's rocky escarpments.
