= Maria Leal da Costa =

Portuguese sculptor (born 1964)

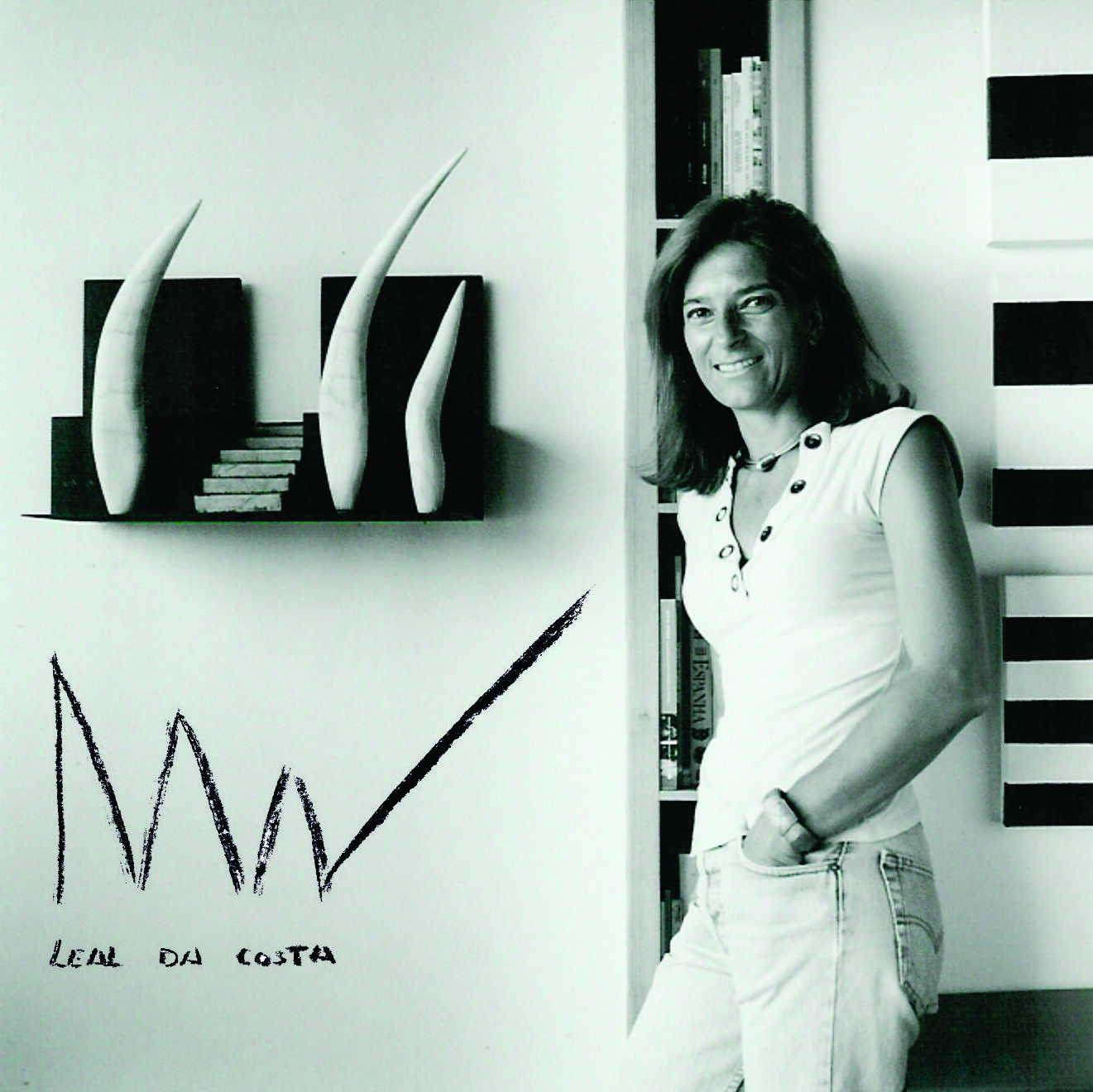
- Born: Maria Ana de Sousa Leal da Costa; November 1, 1964; Évora, Portugal
- Known for: Sculpture

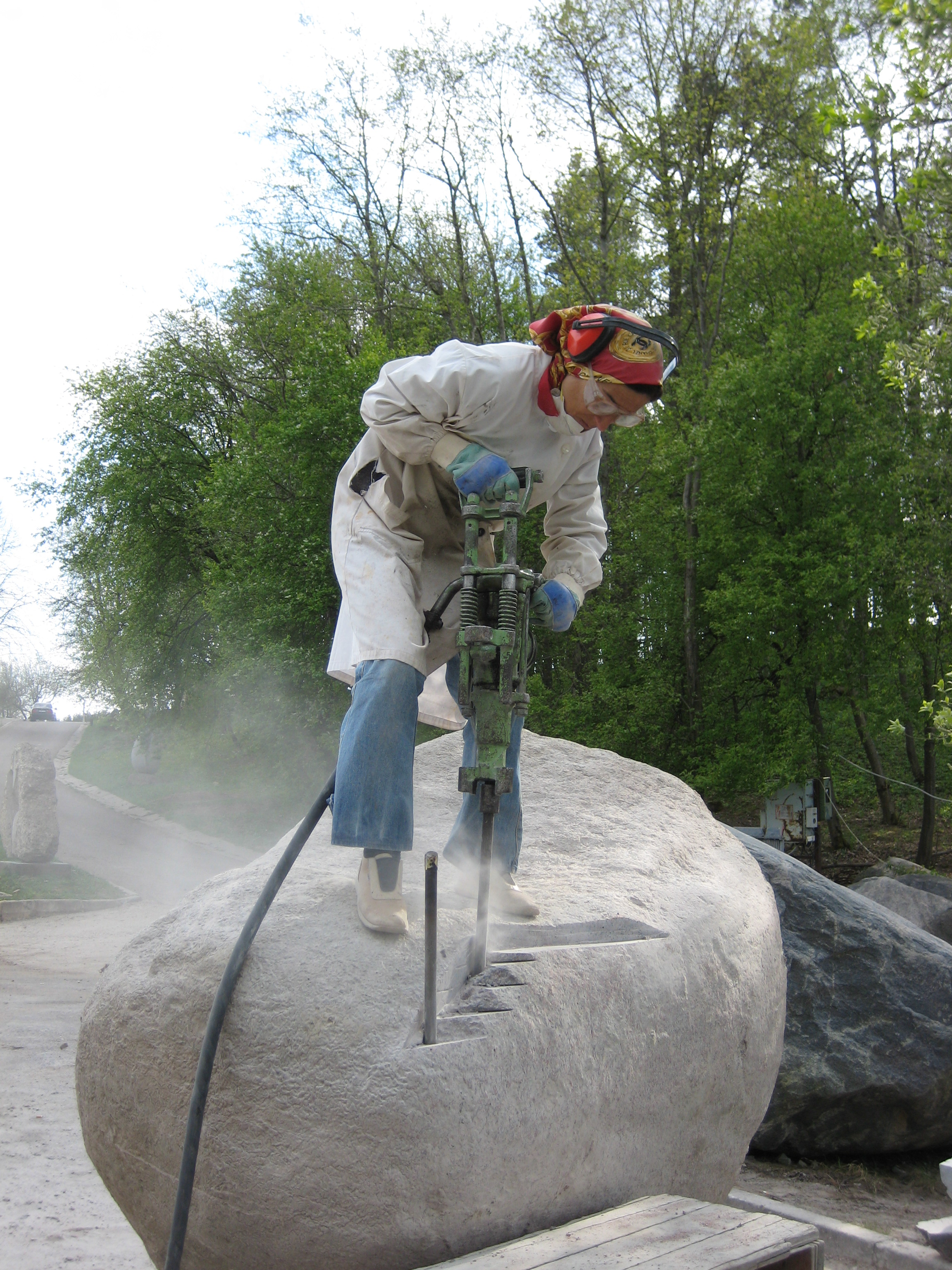
Maria Leal da Costa, working

Maria Ana de Sousa Leal da Costa (Évora, Portugal, November, 1964), is a Portuguese sculptor.

== Life ==
She is the daughter of an artist mother, and an architect father, she studied in the Superior School of Fine Arts of Lisbon and exhibits her work since 1994.

Has a studio in Marvão, in Quinta do Barrieiro, Alentejo, Portugal, where she lives and works since 1999 and where she is developing her project, Alentejo sculpture park.

The books open doors for her to fly to unknown stops, where she finds much of her inspiration, showing how they are an open window to the world. Traveling companion of Camões, Fernão Mendes Pinto, Fernando Pessoa, Sophia de Mello Breyner, Gonçalo M. Tavares, among other writers, she carves her digressions on the iron, marble and bronze, inviting the public to join her in her flights, to transcend, discover and penetrate into the core, in order to contemplate and transmit, demystify and to make us the pedagogy of a fragile planet but always open to all of us.

She struggles with hard materials, as if it were paper, with its natural expressions, the oxides, the textures, the colours or the fractures, in a permanent asceticism to transmit the beautiful, the unimaginable that thrill us, moves us and transport us to a path full of endless discoveries. It takes us to an enchantment to hear the resonance of a world unknown to us and where we want to penetrate into an infinite space of its dreams, into free imagination.

Her works are part of numerous public and private collections, in Portugal, Belgium, Spain, China, United States, Lithuania, Italy.

"The stone flies, floats, runs, speaks... just like the words!", (Maria Leal da Costa).

== Biography ==
Maria Leal da Costa was born in Évora, in 1964. She took the Interiors course at António Arroio School and between 1982 and 1986 attended the Sculpture course at Superior School of Fine Arts of Lisbon. She exhibits her work since 1994. She has a studio in Quinta do Barrieiro, Marvão, Portugal, where she lives and works since 1999.

== Awards and Public Recognition ==
=== 2015 ===
- Publication of the presentation of the sculpture “D’Amor”, in “Public Sculpture Guide of the City of Évora”, by the “Pró-Evora” Group
- Nominated for the award – LUX Plastic Arts 2014

=== 2014 ===
- First prize of the Annual Saloon of the National Society of Fine Arts (SNBA) for the “Correntes de água (Watercourses)” work

=== 2013 ===
- “Career Recognition/Plastic Arts” Prize, “Mais Alentejo” Gala

=== 2011 ===
- Publication of the book “VOAR, poems and pictures resting on the sculptures of Maria Leal da Costa”

=== 2008 ===
- She was awarded the “Mais Artes” prize at “Mais Alentejo” Gala

=== 2007 ===
- Portugal's representative at Stone Sculpture Symposium Vilnoja 2007, Lithuania, with the organization acquiring the work “O Poder do Silêncio (The Power of Silence)”

=== 2006 ===
- “Abanico”, selected sculpture for the VIII “Certame de Artes Plásticas Sala el Brocense da Diputación de Cáceres”, Spain

=== 2004 ===
- Spain, 1st place in the XI Iberian Award of Sculpture, City of Punta Umbría
- Spain, Vigo, honorable mention, Conxemar II Plastic Arts Competition
- Spain, selected for the International Competition of Sculpture in the Culture House in Villafranca de los Barros
- Spain, Salinas, selected for the III Bienal Internacional de Arte de la Mar

=== 2003 ===
- 1st place in the public competition for the conception and execution of the monument to the Alter-Real Horse in Alter do Chão, Portugal
- Spain, selected for the X Iberian Award of Sculpture, City of Punta Umbría, Spain

=== 2002 ===
- Participation in the symposium and workshop held by the Municipality of Vila Viçosa, Portugal

== Individual exhibitions ==
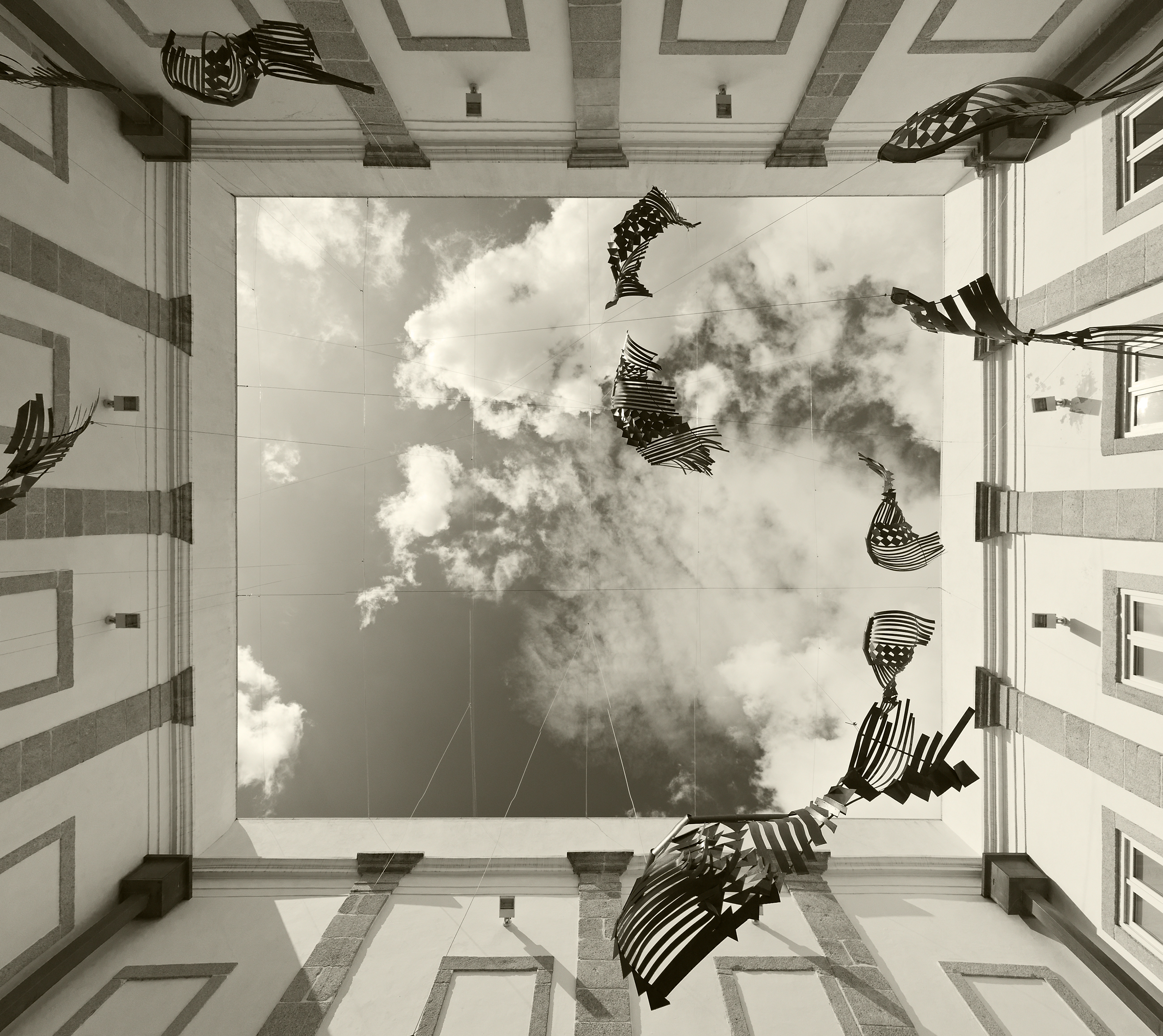
Voar- Escultura de Maria leal da Costa no Museu de Évora

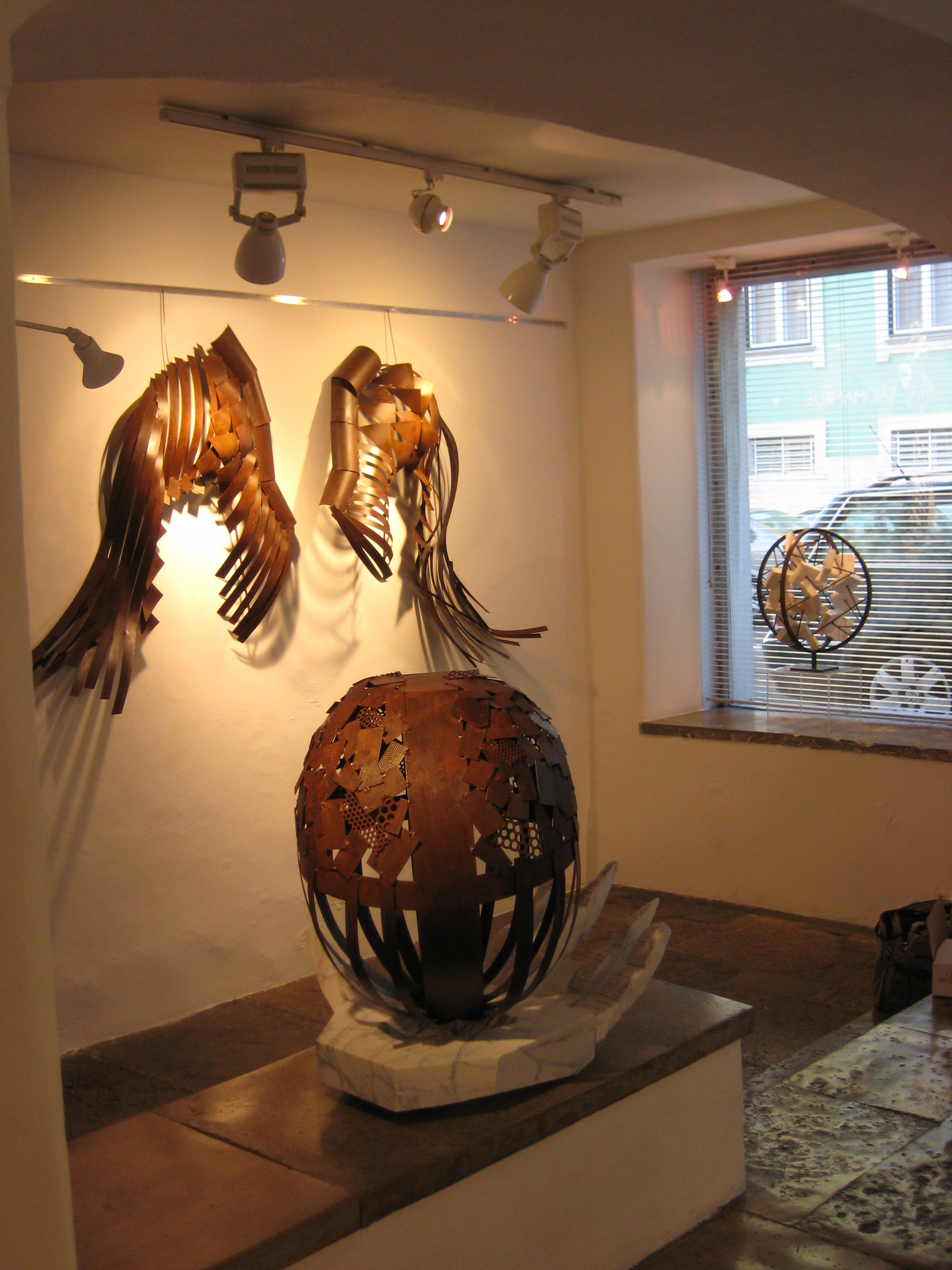
2011 Galeria São Mamede, LisboaPeças de Maria Leal da Costa

=== 2015 ===
- “Leituras líticas (Lithic Readings)”, Belgium, Brussels, Brasil House
- “Pontos de Partida (Starting Points)” Portugal, Marvão Castle and Village

=== 2014 ===
- Land Art Exhibition: “A vida tranquila, o verde da serra, o brilho do luar (The quiet life, the green of the mountain, the moonlight shining”, Portugal, Portalegre, Tarro Garden
- “A essência das coisas - esculturas habitáveis (The essence of things – habitable sculptures)”, Portugal, Portalegre Castle
- “Pontos de Partida (Starting Points)” Portugal, Marvão Castle and Village
- Certame Art Shopping, Caroussel du Louvre, Paris

=== 2013 ===
- “Debaixo destas asas me aconchego (Cozy under these wings)”, China, Macau, Albergue Gallery SCM
- Land art exhibition: “A vida tranquila, o verde da serra, o brilho do luar (The quiet life, the green of the mountain, the moonlight shining)”, Portalegre, Tarro Garden

=== 2012 ===
- “Voar (To fly)”, Évora, Municipal Museum
- “Un dialogo famigliare”, Italy, Roma, Instituto Portoghese di Sant´Antonio
- “Flor da realeza (Royal flower)”, Odivelas, Municipal Gallery
- “A beleza no silêncio de um olhar (The beauty in the silence of a look)”, Oleiros, Municipal Gallery

=== 2011 ===
- “Instalação Voar (To Fly Installation)”, Évora, Municipal Museum
- “As quatro partes das esferas (The four parts of the spheres)” Lisbon, São Mamede Gallery
- “O contorno elementar (Elementary outline)”, Redondo, São Paulo da Serra d’Ossa Convent
- “Ikebana”, Barcelos, Municipal Gallery

=== 2010 ===
- “Voar (To Fly)”, Latvia, Riga, Ventspils and Jurmala cities
- “Ritmanálise”, Porto, City Council
- “Velas são asas que apontam para o céu (Candles are wings that point to the sky)”, Vila Franca de Xira, Municipal Gallery

=== 2009 ===
- She integrated the “Vilnius European Capital of Culture” in Lithuania, invited by Meno Nisa Gallery, with the exhibition “To Fly”, in the cities of Vilnius, Kaunas and Klaipeda

=== 2008 ===
- “Fernão Mendes Pinto”, Matosinhos
- “Pedro e Inês”, Alter do Chão Castle
- Tribute to the painter Charrua, Lisbon, Portalegre tapestries Gallery
- Lisbon, Assembly of the Portuguese Republic

=== 2007 ===
- “Enlaces (Links)”, Spain, Sevilha e Belgium, Brussels, integrated in the Portuguese Presidency of the European Union, and supported by the Luso-Spanish Foundation

=== 2006 ===
- “Primavera (Spring)”, Belgium, Brussels, Orfeu bookstore
- United States of America, California, Benicia, Gina Sequeira Gallery
- Porto, Galeria Belmonte20 Gallery
- “Vibrações (Vibrations)”, Óbidos
- Lisbon, ViniPortugal

=== 2004 ===
- Lisbon, Portuguese Communities Center
- “Alcultur”, Portalegre, Sta. Clara Convent

=== 2003 ===
- Spain, Chiclana, House of Culture
- Spain, Badajoz, Colegio dos Arquitectos
- Portalegre, Sta Clara Convent
- Portalegre, Tapestries Museum

=== 2002 ===
- Alter do Chão, Gallery of Alter Real Stud Farm
- Évora, Gallery of the Directorate General for Cultural Heritage

=== 2001 ===
- “Chegar (To arrive)”, China, Macau, International Institute of Macau, 1st Meeting of the Macanese Communities
- Spain, Villar del Rey
- Lisbon, Sta. Marta Hospital Church
- Évora, Lóios Pousada

=== 2000 to 1995 ===
- Monsaraz, Santiago Church; United States of America, Califórnia
- Ponte de Sor, Municipal Gallery
- Lisboa, Pomar dos Artistas
- Portalegre, Álamo Gallery

== Collective exhibitions ==
=== 2015 ===
- TAG bxl, Belgium, Brussels

=== 2014 ===
- "5th Essence - International Exhibition of Contemporary Art", Batalha, D. João I Cloister of the Monastery of Batalha
- Santarém, 55 Gallery

=== 2013 ===
- “Portas Abertas (Open Doors)”, Évora, Eugénio de Almeida Foundation
- Algarve, Private Gallery
- Castelo de Vide, Nossa Senhora da Esperança Foundation
- Porto, Solar de Sto. António Gallery
- Santarém, 55 Gallery

=== 2012 ===
- England, London, Debut Contemporary Art Gallery
- Almansil, Cultural Center of São Lourenço
- Santarém, 55 Gallery

=== 2011 ===
- “Arte Pintada a letras (Art Painted in Letters)”, Espinho, Municipal Museum

=== 2009 ===
- “Escultura Livre (Free Sculpture)”, Amadora
- “D. Afonso Henriques – Celebration of the 900 years since his birth”, Porto, Vieira Portuense Gallery

=== 2008 ===
- Évora, S. Vicente Church
- Famalicão, Camiliano Museum
- Lisbon, Hibiscus Gallery
- “Escultura Livre (Free Sculpture)”, Loures

=== 2007 ===
- Caminha, “Arte na Leira” Meeting
- “Escultura Livre (Free Sculpture)”, Famalicão
- Lisbon and Porto, São Mamede Gallery

=== 2006 ===
- Caminha, “Arte na Leira” Meeting
- Lisbon, São Mamede Gallery
- Marvão, Municipal Gallery

=== 2005 ===
- Lisboa, Magia Imagem Gallery
- Porto, Foz Castle

=== 2004 ===
- Lisbon, Palace of Independence

=== 2003 ===
- Lisbon, Magia Imagem Gallery

=== 2002 ===
- Azores, Ponta Delgada, F.T.E. Gallery
- Lisbon, Alma Lusa Gallery
- Vila Viçosa, Marble Museum

=== 2000 a 1995 ===
- Lisbon, Palace of Independence
- Portalegre, São Francisco Convent

== Public works ==
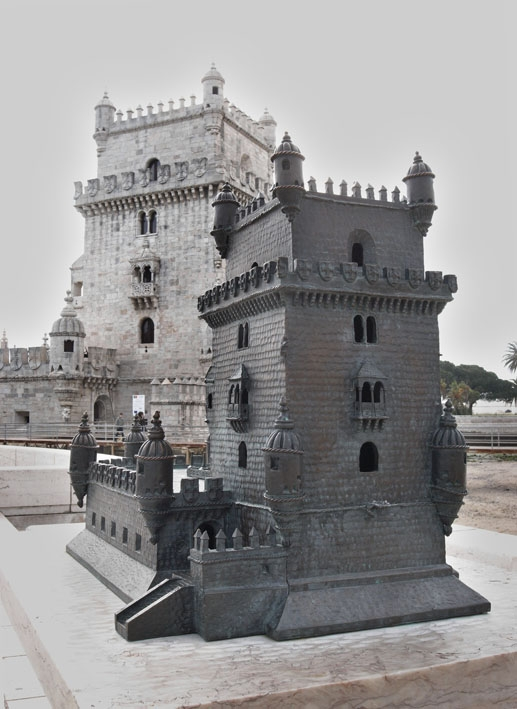
Belém Tower, for blind people

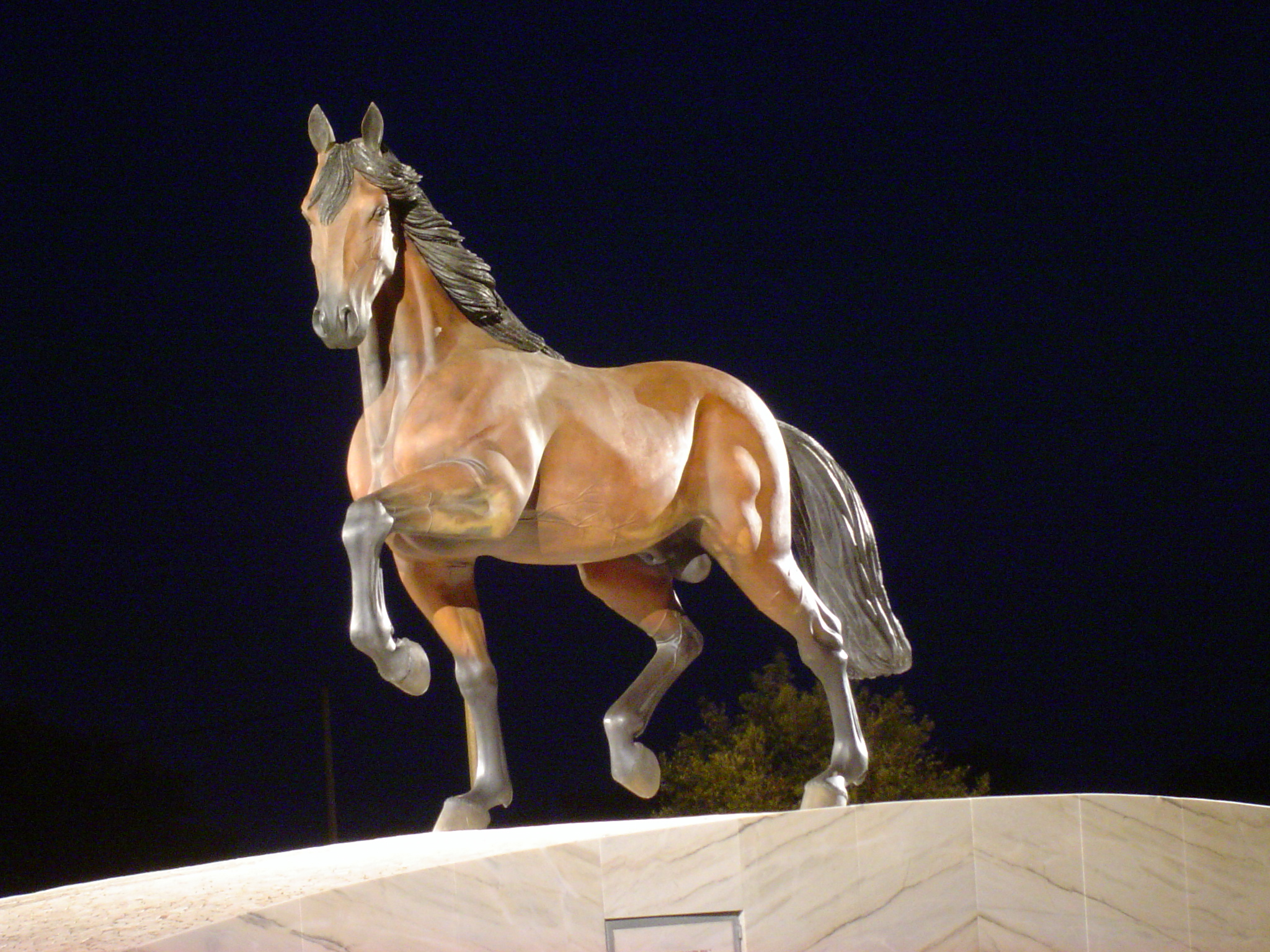
Cavalo de Bronze de Maria Leal da Costa

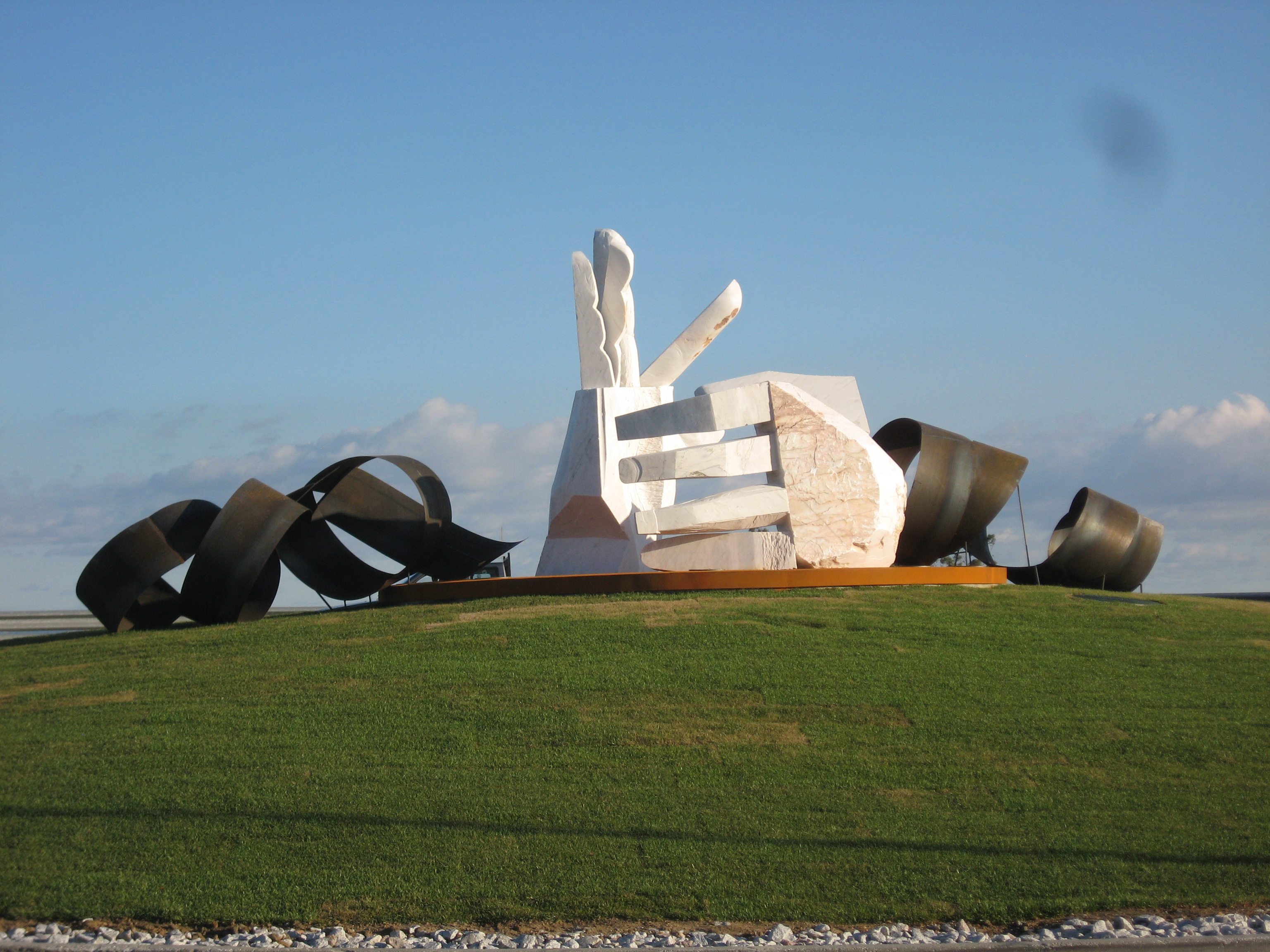
Homenagem Dadores de Sangue de Maria Leal da Costa

=== 2013 ===
- Public Tactile Sculptures: “Centro histórico de Penafiel (Historical center of Penafiel)”, located in front of the City Council of Penafiel
- Public Tactile Sculptures: “Marvão Village”, located at the entrance of the village

=== 2011 ===
- “Francisco Caldeira Amieiro”, Portalegre
- “Dr. Carlos Vacas de Carvalho”, Portalegre

=== 2009 ===
- D’Amor”, Évora, city's roundabout

=== 2007 ===
- “1º Conde de Ervideira”, Évora, Vendinha square

=== 2006 ===
- “Paul Harris”, Lisbon, São João de Brito Church Garden
- “Jogo de Memórias”, Portalegre, City Council

=== 2005 ===
- Public Tactile Sculpture: “Belém Tower”, Lisbon, garden in front of the Belém tower
- Alter do Chão, “Alter Real horse”

=== 2004 ===
- “Chestnut tree”, Marvão, Portagem roundabout
- “Lusitano Horse”, Portalegre, Campo da Feira roundabout
- “Muse”, Castelo de Vide, 25 de Abril garden

=== 2002 ===
- “Lusitano Horse”, Portalegre

== Custom sculptures ==
=== 2012 ===
- COTEC Award, Business Association for Innovation
- “Justice”, Iustitia award, Silva e Sousa & Associados Law Firm

=== 2010 ===
- “Justice”, Iustitia award, Silva e Sousa & Associados Law Firm

=== 2009 ===
- “Justice”, Iustitia award, Silva e Sousa & Associados Law Firm

=== 2008 ===
- “Justice”, Iustitia award, Silva e Sousa & Associados Law Firm
- “Family”, sculpture for UNICEF
