= Pombalia prunifolia =

Conservation status
- Least Concern (IUCN 3.1)

Scientific classification
- Kingdom: Plantae
- Clade: Tracheophytes
- Clade: Angiosperms
- Clade: Eudicots
- Clade: Rosids
- Order: Malpighiales
- Family: Violaceae
- Genus: Pombalia
- Species: P. prunifolia

Binomial name
- Pombalia prunifolia (Humb. & Bonpl. ex Willd.) Paula-Souza

Species of plant

Pombalia prunifolia is a species of plant in the family Violaceae. It's native range is from Nicaragua to Brazil.
