= Grão Pará and Maranhão Company =

Portuguese chartered company

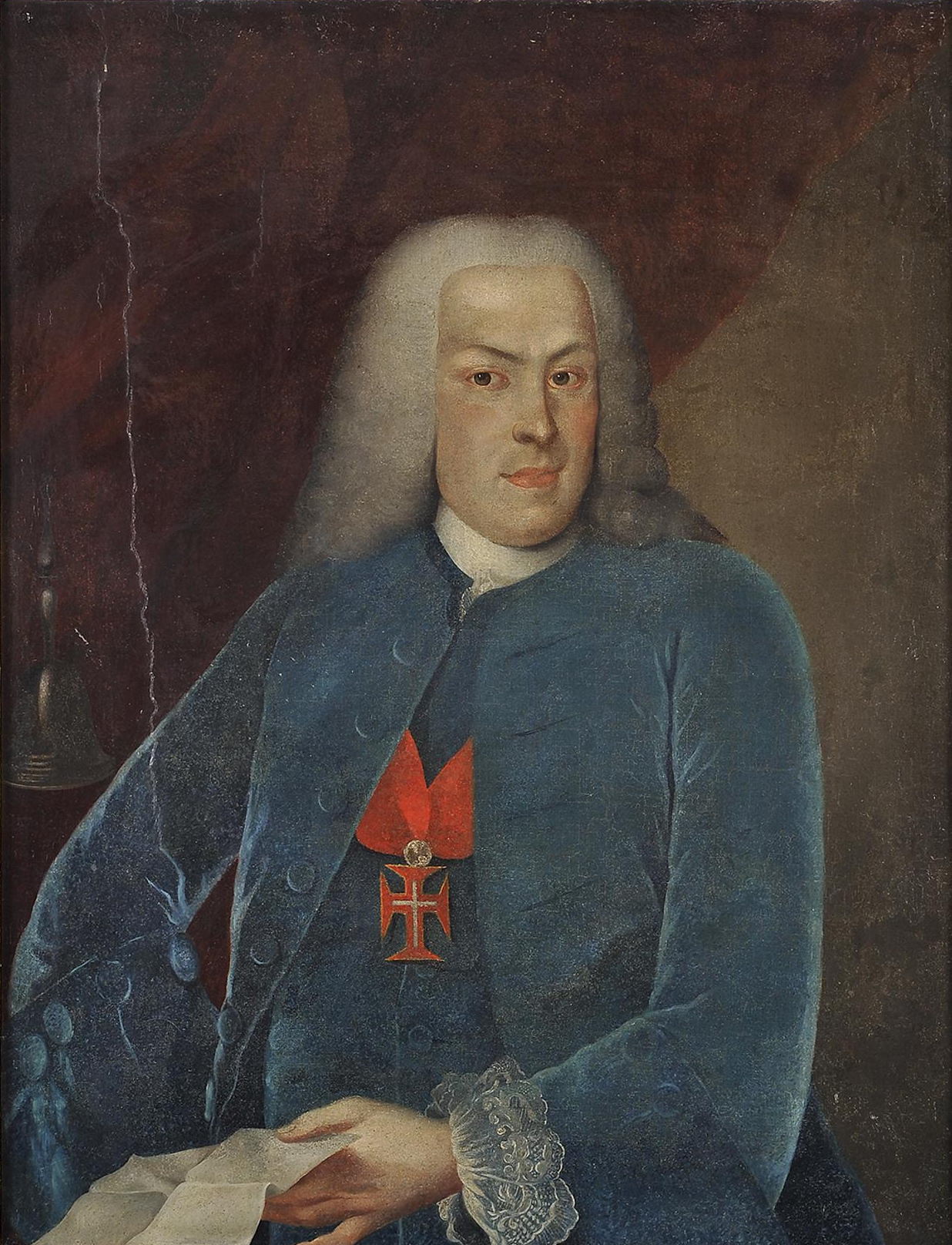
The Marquis of Pombal, the company's founder

The General Company of Grão-Pará and Maranhão (Portuguese: Companhia Geral do Grão-Pará e Maranhão) was a Portuguese chartered company founded in 1755 by the Marquis of Pombal to develop and oversee commercial activity in the state of Grão-Pará and Maranhão, an administrative division of the colony of Brazil. Employees of the company were officially considered to be in the service of the Portuguese Crown and were responsible directly to Lisbon. The company greatly increased the volume of trade in Grão-Pará and Maranhão, though after the Marquis of Pombal fell from power Queen Maria I ordered it to be shut down in 1778. It was one of the five monopoly companies founded by the marquis de Pombal, and its activities were close to the ones of the Companhia Geral de Comércio de Pernambuco e Paraíba.

== History ==
In 1755, Portuguese Prime Minister the Marquis of Pombal founded the Grão Pará and Maranhão Company as a chartered company to oversee and develop commercial activity in the state of Grão-Pará and Maranhão, an administrative division of Portuguese colony of Brazil. The company was granted a monopoly on Grão-Pará and Maranhão's foreign trade for two decades, including the Brazilian slave trade, which formed a major component of colonial Brazil's economy; as the enslavement of indigenous peoples had been abolished, white Brazilian planters had increasing turned to enslaved Africans as sources of labor.

The creation of the company followed concerns raised by the Captain General of Pará and Maranhão, Francisco Xavier de Mendonça Furtado, who warned Lisbon in 1754 that the northern Brazilian provinces were facing economic stagnation. Acting both on his own initiative and on behalf of local plantation owners, he argued that a chartered trading company was necessary to secure labor, expand commerce, and stabilize the regional economy.

Employees of the company were officially considered to be in the service of the Portuguese Crown and were responsible directly to Lisbon. The fact that the company was under Crown control meant the Portuguese government was able to use it to cover up smuggling and tax evasion in the Portuguese Empire. Local elites in Brazil quickly grew to resent the monopoly granted to the company, which the Marquis of Pombal ignored out of a desire to protect his economic interests in the region.

After the company's founding, trade between Grão Pará and Maranhão and Portugal, which had previously been small in volume, began to increase exponentially. Company merchant ships would leave the colonial settlement of Belém to engage in the triangular trade, transporting rice, cotton, cocoa, ginger, wood, medicinal plants and enslaved Africans between Brazil, Africa and Portugal. Between 1755 and 1778, the company transported 28,083 enslaved Africans to Brazil. In 1773–4, corrupt company agents played a prominent role in aggravating a deadly famine in Cape Verde, selling scarce food to passing ships for personal profit.

After the death of King Joseph I of Portugal in 1778 and the subsequent fall of the Marquis of Pombal from political power, a period in Portuguese history known as the Viradeira began. The successor to the Portuguese throne, Queen Maria I of Portugal, undertook a review of all of the policies implemented by the Marquis of Pombal. She ordered that the company's monopolies be revoked and shut down the company the same year.

The Companhia Geral do Grão-Pará e Maranhão was founded with a capital of approximately 1.2 million cruzados, making it significantly smaller than the Companhia Geral de Pernambuco e Paraíba, whose capital was roughly three times larger.

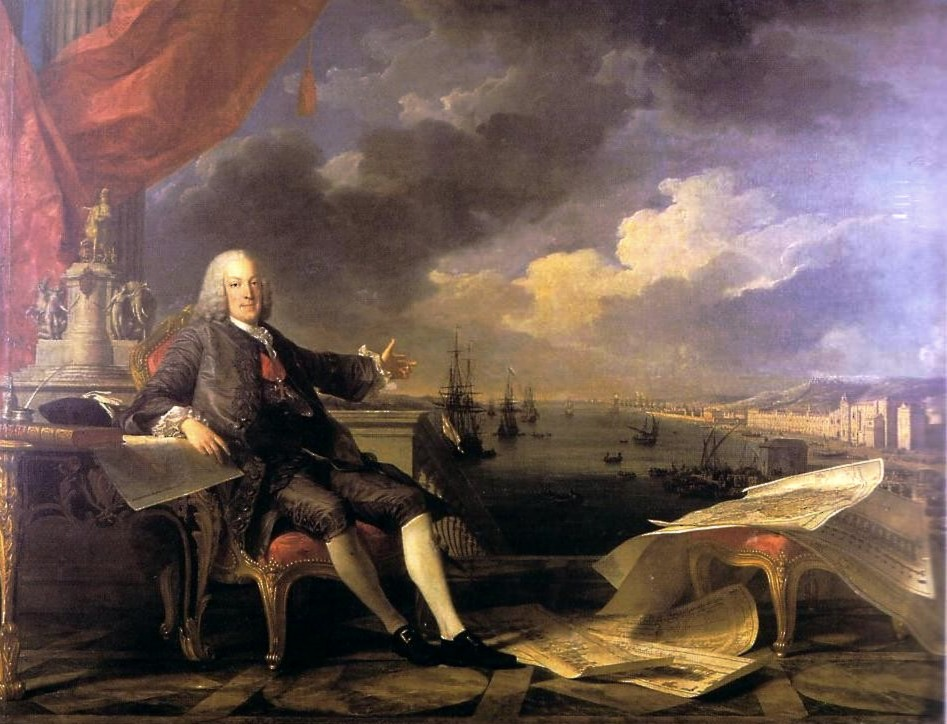
Marquis of Pombal, founder of the Companhia Geral do Grão-Pará e Maranhão. Painting by Louis-Michel van Loo (1707–1771) and Joseph Vernet (1714–1789)

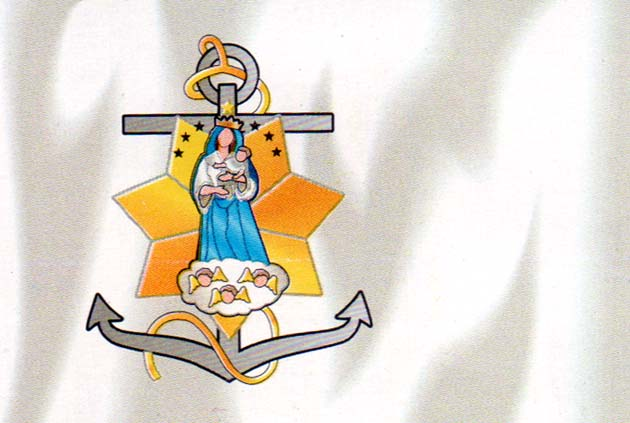
Bandeira da Companhia de Comércio do Grão-Pará e Maranhão, 1755

== Commercial activities, monopoly privileges and slave trade ==
The company traded primarily in cacao, rice, sugar, tobacco, and coffee, all of which experienced strong demand in European markets during the mid eighteenth century. During the same period, Brazil also became an increasingly important supplier of cotton, driven by rising demand from English manufacturers. The Companhia Geral do Grão-Pará e Maranhão was granted exclusive rights to transport enslaved people to the provinces of Maranhão and Pará and to export goods from the region. This was also the case for the sister company Companhia Geral de Pernambuco e Paraíba, in the Pernambuco and Paraíba regions.

== Decline and dissolution ==
The company's position weakened following the severe famine in Cape Verde between 1773 and 1775, which exposed administrative abuses and eroded metropolitan support. Merchants in Lisbon petitioned Queen Maria I in 1777 not to renew the monopoly, echoing complaints that had already been raised shortly after the company's creation in 1755.

The death of King José I led to the political downfall of the Marquis of Pombal, the company's principal protector, accelerating the erosion of its privileges. In 1778, following consultation with the Treasury Council, Queen Maria I issued a decree terminating the twenty year monopoly and reopening the ports of Pará and Maranhão to free trade. This marked the end of the company and the collapse of the monopolistic regime established under the 1755 statute.

== See also ==
- History of Portugal (1640–1777)
