= Pombalia phyllanthoides =

Conservation status
- Vulnerable (IUCN 3.1)

Scientific classification
- Kingdom: Plantae
- Clade: Embryophytes
- Clade: Tracheophytes
- Clade: Spermatophytes
- Clade: Angiosperms
- Clade: Eudicots
- Clade: Rosids
- Order: Malpighiales
- Family: Violaceae
- Genus: Pombalia
- Species: P. phyllanthoides

Binomial name
- Pombalia phyllanthoides (Planch. & Linden) Paula-Souza

Species of plant

Pombalia phyllanthoides is a species of plant in the family Violaceae. It is native to Colombia and Venezuela.
