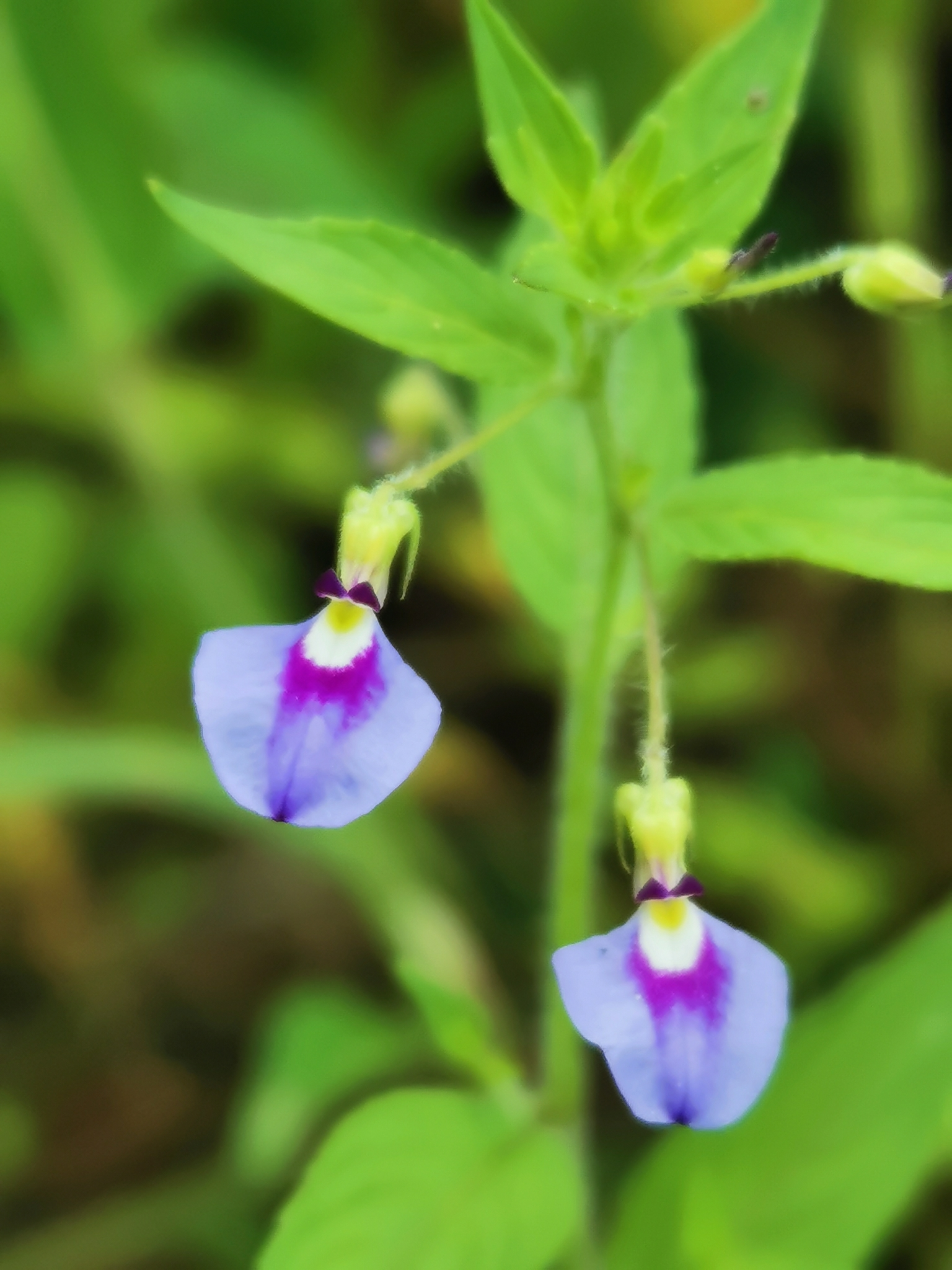
- Pombalia glabra

Scientific classification
- Kingdom: Plantae
- Clade: Tracheophytes
- Clade: Angiosperms
- Clade: Eudicots
- Clade: Rosids
- Order: Malpighiales
- Family: Violaceae
- Genus: Pombalia; Vand.

Synonyms
- Solea Spreng.

= Pombalia =

Genus of flowering plant

Pombalia Vand. is a genus of flowering plants belonging to the family Violaceae.

Its native range is the tropical and subtropical parts of Central and South America, Mexico and the American states of Arizona, Colorado, Kansas, New Mexico, Oklahoma and Texas. It has been introduced to Florida, Georgia, New Jersey, North Carolina (in the USA), KwaZulu-Natal (South Africa) and Vietnam (in Asia).

The genus name of Pombalia is in honour of Sebastião José de Carvalho e Melo, 1st Marquis of Pombal (1699–1782), a Portuguese statesman and diplomat who effectively ruled the Portuguese Empire from 1750 to 1777 as chief minister to King Joseph I. It was first described and published in Fasciculus Plantarum cum novis generibus et speciebus. Olisipone (Fasc. Pl.) on page 7 in 1771.

== Known species ==
According to Kew;

- Pombalia arenaria (Ule) Paula-Souza
- Pombalia atropurpurea (A.St.-Hil.) Paula-Souza
- Pombalia attenuata (Humb. & Bonpl. ex Willd.) Paula-Souza
- Pombalia barbata Paula-Souza
- Pombalia bicolor (A.St.-Hil.) Paula-Souza
- Pombalia bigibbosa (A.St.-Hil.) Paula-Souza
- Pombalia brevicaulis (Mart.) Paula-Souza
- Pombalia brevis (Dowell) Paula-Souza
- Pombalia calceolaria (L.) Paula-Souza
- Pombalia chodatii (Hassl.) Paula-Souza
- Pombalia communis (A.St.-Hil.) Paula-Souza
- Pombalia cristalina Paula-Souza
- Pombalia glabra (Dowell) Paula-Souza
- Pombalia glauca (Chodat) Paula-Souza
- Pombalia graminifolia (Chodat) Paula-Souza
- Pombalia hassleriana (Chodat) Paula-Souza
- Pombalia hespericliva (H.E.Ballard & al.) H.E.Ballard & Paula-Souza
- Pombalia heterosepala (Eichler) Paula-Souza
- Pombalia hieronymi (Griseb.) Paula-Souza
- Pombalia insignis Paula-Souza
- Pombalia jefensis (Todzia) H.E.Ballard & Paula-Souza
- Pombalia lanata (A.St.-Hil.) Paula-Souza
- Pombalia lehmannii (Hieron.) Paula-Souza
- Pombalia leucopogon (Sparre) Paula-Souza
- Pombalia linearifolia (Vahl) Paula-Souza
- Pombalia longistyla (Schulze-Menz) Paula-Souza
- Pombalia oppositifolia (L.) Paula-Souza
- Pombalia paraguariensis (Chodat) Paula-Souza
- Pombalia parviflora (Mutis ex L.f.) Paula-Souza
- Pombalia phyllanthoides (Planch. & Linden) Paula-Souza
- Pombalia poaya (A.St.-Hil.) Paula-Souza
- Pombalia potosina (Morton) Paula-Souza
- Pombalia prunifolia (Humb. & Bonpl. ex Willd.) Paula-Souza
- Pombalia rivalis (Arech.) Paula-Souza
- Pombalia serrata (Phil.) Paula-Souza
- Pombalia setigera (A.St.-Hil.) Paula-Souza
- Pombalia sprucei (Eichler) Paula-Souza
- Pombalia strigoides (Taub.) Paula-Souza
- Pombalia sylvicola (Standl. & Steyerm.) H.E.Ballard & Paula-Souza
- Pombalia velutina (Schulze-Menz) Paula-Souza
- Pombalia verbenacea (Kunth) Paula-Souza
- Pombalia verrucosa (Paula-Souza) Paula-Souza
- Pombalia verticillata (Ortega) Paula-Souza
- Pombalia wrightii (Urb.) H.E.Ballard & Paula-Souza
