= Eleonora Ernestina von Daun, Marquise of Pombal =

Austrian noblewoman (1721–1789)

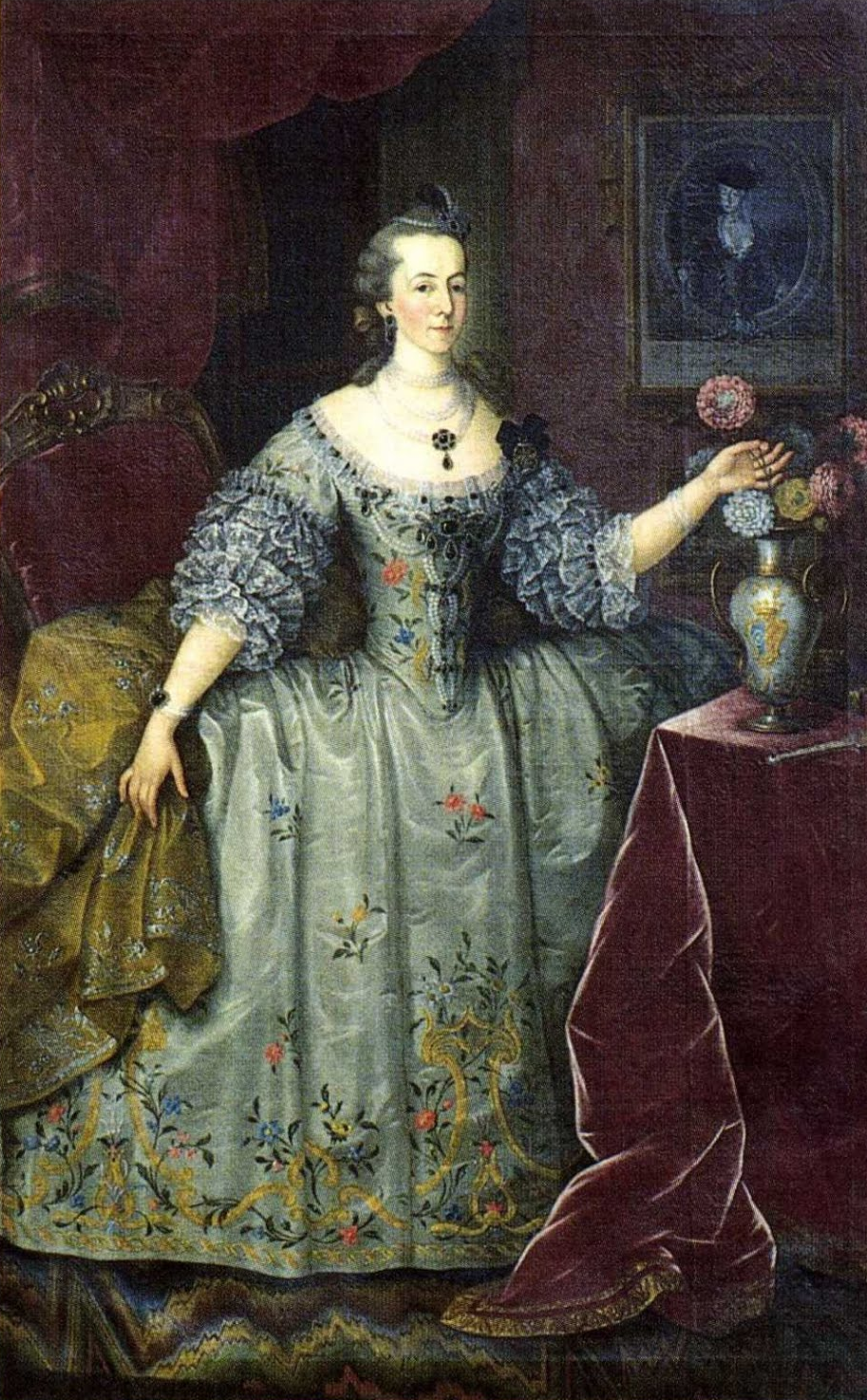
Portrait of Eleanora Ernestina von Daun, Marquise of Pombal

Eleonora Ernestina von Daun, Marquise of Pombal (2 November 1721 – 3 January 1789) was an Austrian noblewoman who became the second wife of Portuguese statesman Sebastião José de Carvalho e Melo, 1st Marquis of Pombal.

== Early life ==
Born in Vienna, Austria, she was the daughter of Count Heinrich Reichard Lorenz von Daun (1673–1729) and his wife, Countess Maria Josepha Violante von Poymund und Payersberg (1691–1758). The Daun family belonged to an old German nobility which originated from the Rhineland and derived its name from the ancestral seat at Daun south of the High Eifel range.

== Biography ==
In 1745, Eleanora met Sebastião José de Carvalho e Melo, a Portuguese diplomat who was in Vienna to serve as a mediator in the solution of a serious quarrel between the Holy Roman empress Maria Theresa and the Vatican; they resolved to marry in December of that year. However, Carvalho e Melo felt the Austrian climate was bad for his health and, at the advice of the physician Gerard van Swieten, he submitted his resignation and returned to Lisbon with his wife as 1749 was coming to an end. In 1759, her husband was made Count of Oeiras and, in 1769, Marquis of Pombal.

== Death ==
The Marquise of Pombal died seven years after her husband, aged 67, in the family palace in Rua Formosa (today called Rua de O Século), in Lisbon.
