= Charles King (merchant) =

British merchant and writer on economics

- Occupations: Merchant and writer on economics

Charles King (fl. 1721) was a British merchant and writer on economics

== Biography ==
King was a London merchant in the reign of Queen Anne. He wrote several papers in the "British Merchant," a periodical which appeared twice a week during the summer of 1713, at the time of the proposed treaty of commerce with France. The object of the paper was to refute the reciprocity arguments propounded by Daniel Defoe in favour of the treaty in his "Mercator;" it was started by Henry Martin, and had among its contributors Joshua Gee (concerning whose influence see Hume, Philosophical Works, 1884, iii. 340), Sir Charles Cooke, Sir Theodore Janssen, Nathaniel Torriano, and other leading merchants, several of whom had a special audience in the House of Lords on the subject of the treaty (2 and 4 June 1713). Backed up by the Earl of Halifax, "the support and very spirit of the paper" (Brit. Merch. Preface, p. xvii), Lord Stanhope, and the bulk of the commercial classes in the country, the "British Merchant" more than neutralised the effect of Defoe's paper, and finally secured a majority of nine against the eighth and ninth articles of the treaty. Its object achieved, the "British Merchant" ceased to appear, but the most important numbers were collected and edited by King in book form under the title of "The British Merchant, or Commerce Preserved," 3 vols. 8vo, London, 1721. King was at that time chamber-keeper to the treasury, and he dedicated the concluding volume of the work to Paul Methuen, son of the framer of the Methuen treaty, and comptroller of his majesty's household. He was allowed 395l. 16s. from the exchequer for expenses of printing, and copies were sent to "each of the corporations of Great Britain which send members to parliament" at the cost of the treasury (Cal. Treas. Papers, 1720–8, ccxl. 32). The work may thus be supposed to represent the views of Walpole's government (though not perhaps of Walpole himself) upon economic matters. It was, however, less an exposition of theory than an appeal to contemporary common sense, and to the interests involved in the Methuen treaty of 1703 with Portugal against the supposed fallacious doctrine of reciprocity advanced by Bolingbroke, and set forth in Defoe's "Essay on the Treaty of Commerce with France," 1713. Such general theories as it did contain were based without alteration upon the treatise (reprinted in 1713) of Thomas Mun, showing that the object of commercial policy was "to encrease the exportation of our commodities and to decrease the consumption of foreign wares." The "British Merchant" enjoyed unique authority during the forty years following its publication, and its statistics (though by no means invariably accurate) on British commerce, the extent of markets, price of labour, and kindred subjects render it indispensable to the historian of commerce during the early Georgian era. The book was republished in 1743, but there is no evidence to show if King was living at that time, or if he was identical with the Charles King "of Westminster Hall," printer and publisher, who issued the "Tracts against Popery" of Michael Geddes in 1715, and the "General Treatise of Mortality" of Richard Fiddes in 1724.
