= Pombalia linearifolia =

Scientific classification
- Kingdom: Plantae
- Clade: Tracheophytes
- Clade: Angiosperms
- Clade: Eudicots
- Clade: Rosids
- Order: Malpighiales
- Family: Violaceae
- Genus: Pombalia
- Species: P. linearifolia

Binomial name
- Pombalia linearifolia (Vahl) Paula-Souza

Species of plant

Pombalia linearifolia is a species of plant. It is native to parts of the Caribbean.
