= Pombalia arenaria =

Scientific classification
- Kingdom: Plantae
- Clade: Embryophytes
- Clade: Tracheophytes
- Clade: Angiosperms
- Clade: Eudicots
- Clade: Rosids
- Order: Malpighiales
- Family: Violaceae
- Genus: Pombalia
- Species: P. arenaria

Binomial name
- Pombalia arenaria (Ule) Paula-Souza

Species of plant

Pombalia arenaria is a species of plant in the family Violaceae. It is native to Bolivia and parts of Brazil.
