= Henry Martyn (economist) =

Lawyer and Whig loyalist (1665–1721)

Henry Martyn (baptised 1665 at Aldbourne, Wiltshire – 1721 at Blackheath, London) was a lawyer and Whig loyalist in early eighteenth-century England. He was the author of Considerations Upon the East India Trade (1701), which went even beyond the case for free trade advanced seventy-five years later by Adam Smith in The Wealth of Nations. Martyn’s tract contains other remarkable insights that became important features of classical political economy, such as the nature and advantages of the division of labor, the dependence of the latter on the extent of the market, the workings of a market economy, the role of money, and the impact of international trade on resource allocation, on productivity, and on economic welfare.

He was opposed to the protectionist policies of his time and supported free market. He aspired to enter the political arena, but because he felt his vision would not be accepted and would harm his political ambitions, he was compelled to publish his famous work anonymously.

Martyn was also a writer for The Spectator and The British Merchant.
