= Companhia Geral de Pernambuco e Paraíba =

Portuguese monopoly company that operated in colonial Brazil

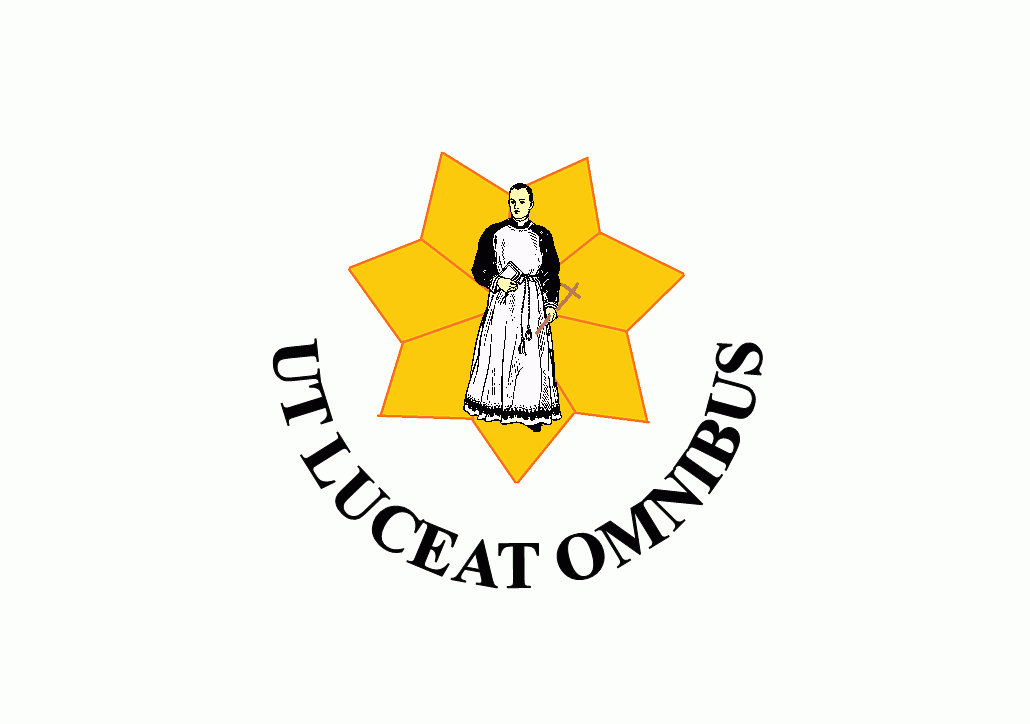
Flag of the Companhia Geral de Comércio de Pernambuco e Paraíba

The General Company of Pernambuco and Paraíba (Portuguese: Companhia Geral de Pernambuco e Paraíba) was a privileged monopoly company created by the Marquis of Pombal in the second half of the 18th century in Portugal. It was established along with four other pombaline companies at the time.

Founded on 13 August 1759, it was intended to promote and control the commercial activity within the captaincies of Pernambuco and Paraíba, in colonial Brazil. Maria I of Portugal ended the monopoly at the beginning of the 1780s, in the context of the so-called "Viradeira".

== Foundation ==
Institution document of the company, 1759

The Marqui of Pombal established five monopolistic companies in the 18th century with the goal to develop the Portuguese mercantilist model. They were the Companhia Geral do Grão-Pará e do Maranhão (founded in 1755), the Companhia da Pesca da Baleia (founded in 1756), the Companhia da Agricultura dos Vinhos do Alto Douro (founded in 1756), the Companhia da Pescaria do Atum e Sardinha no Algarve (founded in 1772). Among them, the Companhia Geral de Pernambuco e Paraíba was founded in 1759.

The Companhia de Comércio de Pernambuco e Paraíba was a monopoly company responsible, between 1759 and 1780, for carrying out all the transatlantic trade between the captaincy of Pernambuco and its adjacent captaincies: Paraíba, Rio Grande do Norte, Ceará, as well as parts of Alagoas.

The company purchased export agricultural inputs such as sugar, tobacco, cotton, and leather, selling them at fixed prices set by the Inspection Board. Additionally, the company engaged in the sale of manufactured products and provided financing for consumer goods and producers' tools. It supplied labor by selling enslaved people from Angola and managed the acquisition of necessary regional goods, alongside building ships. The company and its members enjoyed privileges including private judgment in profit-related actions, a 20-year commercial monopoly, exemption from compulsory public service, and certain tax exemptions.

== Administrative structure ==
The company's trade network spanned Europe, Asia, and Africa, with England being the primary supplier of manufactured products like cotton fabrics and sugar refining goods. Holland provided naval supplies, while Hamburg, Genoa, Trieste, Venice, Marseille, Rouen, and Madrid, along with the Azores islands Faial and São Miguel, supplied linen and sailcloths. From Goa, various Asian fabrics were imported. These goods were sold both to the company and colonials, aiming to create a consumer market in Portugal for manufactured goods. Cloths and crockery were primarily sold to Pernambuco plantation owners, with foreign-made goods surcharged to make domestic products more attractive.

The company also forced African enslaved people to Brazil, mainly from Angola. There were 49,344 enslaved people brought from Angola to Brazil between 1761 and 1786. Most were adults and 508 were listed as children.

Sugar was the main product sold by the Pernambuco and Paraíba Company. Before its establishment, the annual sugar production averaged below 6,100 boxes, which increased to 8,100 during its monopoly. Despite conflicts in the 1770s over sugar prices, only three price increases occurred (1765, 1770, and 1777). The company's administrators aimed to keep Brazilian sugar competitive, refining it primarily in London and Hamburg, which doubled its value and yielded a 250% profit, benefiting neither the sugar mill owners nor the company itself.

The archives of the company are held at the Portuguese National Archives of Torre do Tombo.
