= Trafaria =

- Civil parish
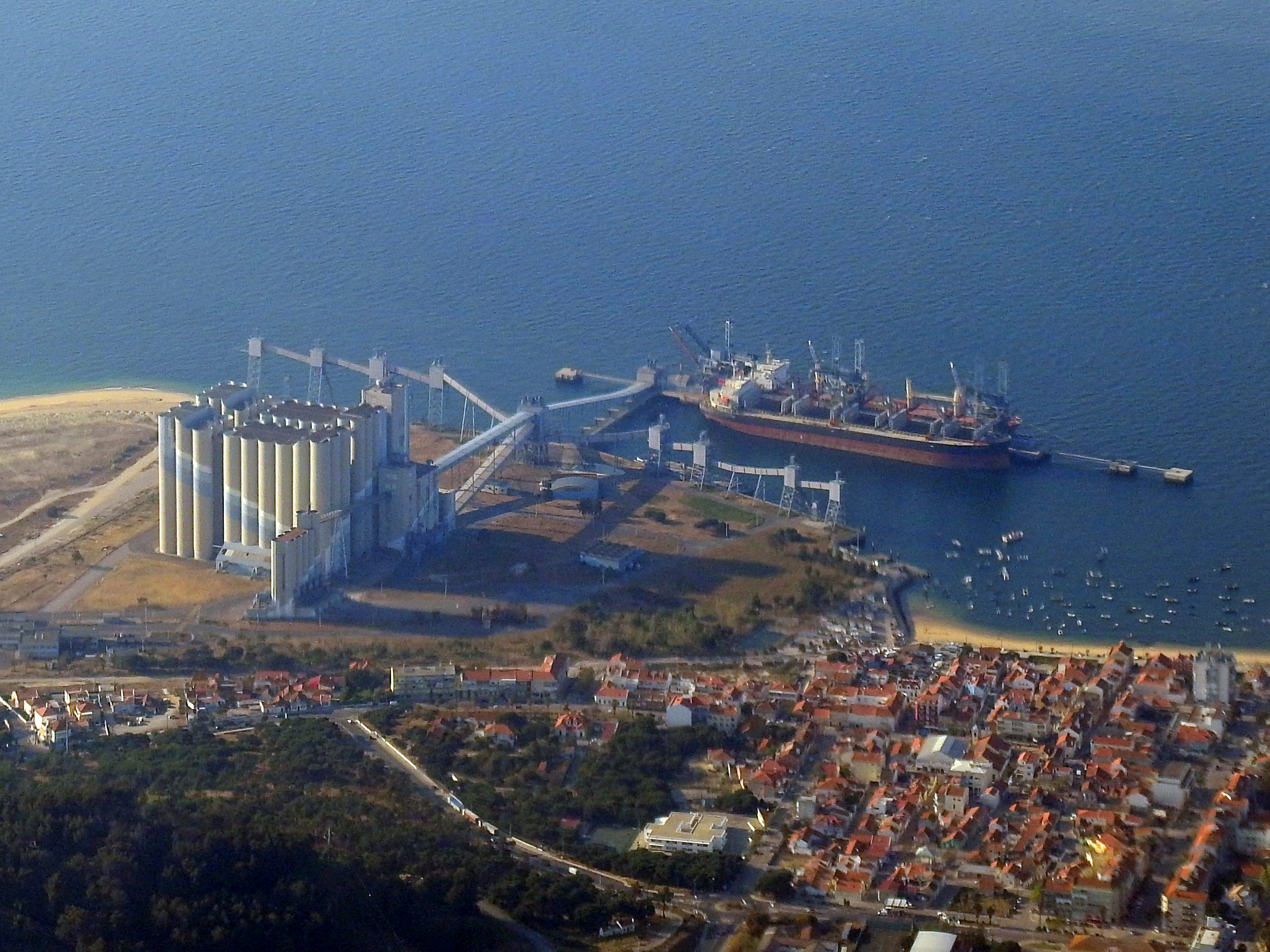
- Aerial view of Silopor facility and part of Trafaria.

- Location in Portugal
- Coordinates: 38.670°N 9.239°W
- Country: Portugal
- Region: Lisbon
- Metropolitan area: Lisbon
- District: Setúbal
- Municipality: Almada
- Disbanded: 2013

Area
  - Total: 5.73 km^{2} (2.21 sq mi)

Population (2011)
  - Total: 5,696
  - Density: 994/km^{2} (2,570/sq mi)
- Time zone: UTC+00:00 (WET)
  - Summer (DST): UTC+01:00 (WEST)

Trafaria is a former civil parish in the municipality (concelho) of Almada, Lisbon metropolitan area, Portugal. In 2013, the parish merged into the new parish Caparica e Trafaria. The population in 2011 was 5,696, in an area of 5.73 km^{2}.
