= Battle of Valencia de Alcántara =

1762 battle of the Seven Years' War

- Part of the Spanish invasion of Portugal
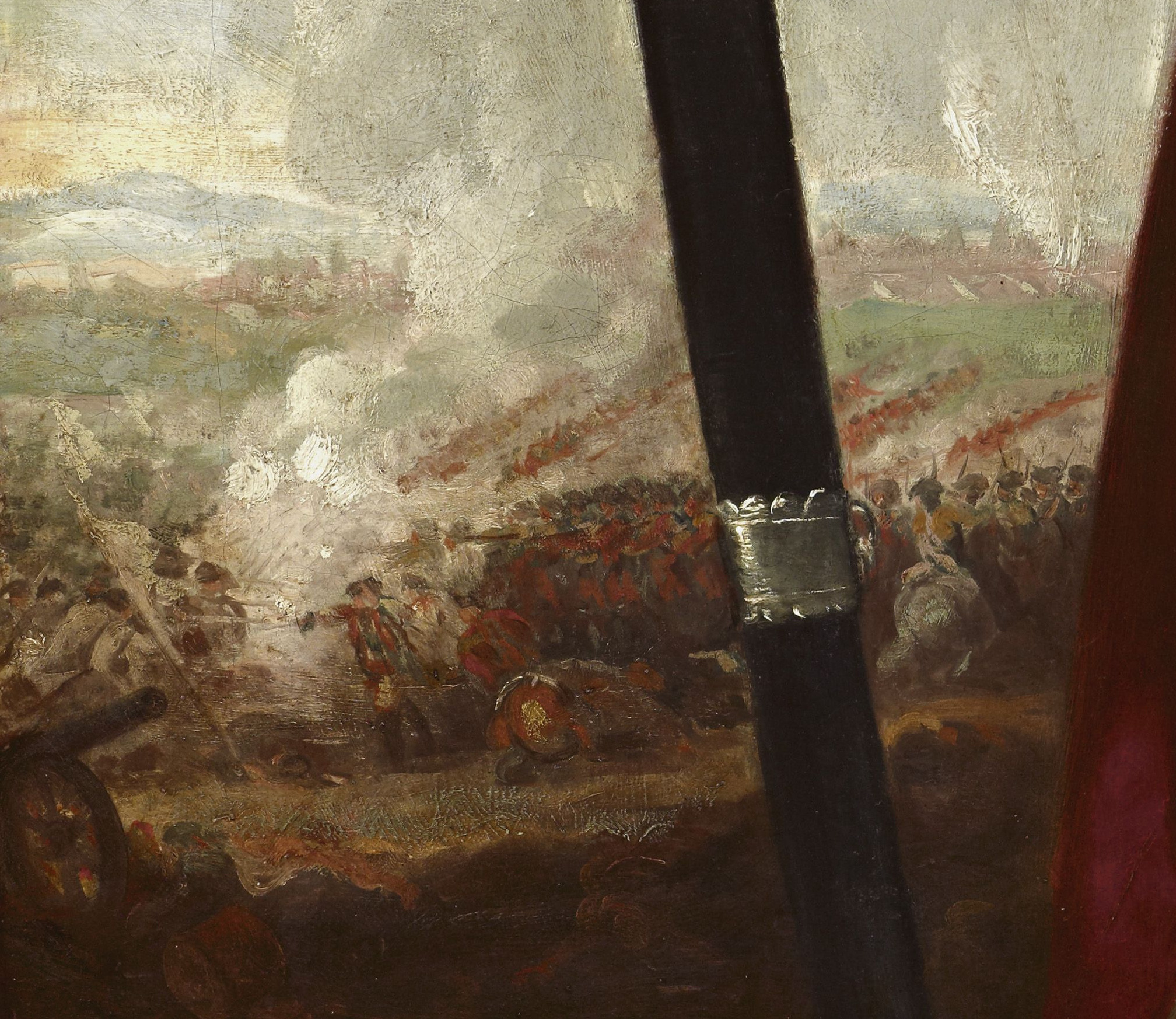
- Possible depiction of the battle in Portrait of John Burgoyne (1766)
Date	27 August 1762
Location	Valencia de Alcántara, Spain 39.4167°N 7.2333°W
Result	Anglo-Portuguese victory

Belligerents
Great Britain; Portugal	Spain

Commanders and leaders
John Burgoyne	Miguel de Irunibeni

Strength
2,950; 4 guns	4,000

Casualties and losses
25 killed or wounded	600 killed, wounded or captured

The Battle of Valencia de Alcántara took place in August 1762 when an Anglo Portuguese force led by John Burgoyne surprised and captured the town of Valencia de Alcántara from its Spanish defenders during the Seven Years' War. The town was taken on 27 August as part of the defence against the Spanish invasion of Portugal.

The force that captured Almeida was part of a significant Spanish offensive to overrun Portugal. A northern pincer invaded Portugal from Galicia crossing the Douro and threatening Porto while the southern force crossed the border from Ciudad Rodrigo. With Spain invading Portugal in support of France, Britain sent reinforcements to aid the Portuguese; in total around 8,000 men led by John Burgoyne.

On 24 August, Count of Lippe decided to attack the Spanish town of Valencia de Alcántara, a central supply base for the invasion. He sent John Burgoyne, a colonel of the 16th Light Dragoons now local rank of brigadier general with an Anglo-Portuguese contingent of around 2,800 men (400 light dragoons, six British infantry companies of the 3rd Regiment of Foot, eleven Portuguese grenadiers companies, two howitzers and two light guns). Burgoyne passed the Tagus at Abrantes. At Castelo de Vide, Burgoyne was joined by 100 Portuguese foot, 50 irregular cavalry, and about 40 armed peasants.

On 27 August, after a forced march totalling 45 miles, they attacked and captured the town, surprising the Spanish defenders; Burgoyne led his cavalry with effect. Once the town had been captured, the British and Portuguese quickly cleared the neighbourhood of the Spanish troops, taking several prisoners, including a Spanish general. In addition, the town was left undamaged and had to pay a ransom of a year's taxes in corn.

This little victory raised Portuguese morale. Burgoyne was given a large diamond, and the Spanish Colours were captured. The victory also set back the invasion and contributed to the general victory that year. Two months later he defeated the Spanish again at the battle of Vila Velha.

== See also ==
- Great Britain in the Seven Years War
- Battle of Ouguela

== Bibliography ==
- Jaques, Tony. Dictionary of Battles and Sieges. Greenwood Press, 2007
- Kirby, Mike, The Portuguese Army – Seven Years War, Seven Years War Association Journal, Vol. XII No. 3
- Pereira Sales, Ernesto Augusto; O Conde de Lippe em Portugal, Vila Nova de Famalicao: Publicacoes da Comissao de Historia Militar, 1936, pp. 55–62
