= Lord of the manor (disambiguation) =

Lord of the manor is a title of a mediaeval land-holder.

Lord of the manor may also refer to:

- Lord of the Manor (film), a 1933 British film
- The Lord of the Manor, the play by John Burgoyne
- Lord of the Manor, Kent, a closed pub and road junction on the Isle of Thanet, Kent

== See also ==
- Lady of the manor (disambiguation)
