= Valencia de Alcántara Synagogue =

Historic former synagogue in Valencia de Alcántara, Spain

- Spanish: Sinagoga de Valencia de Alcántara
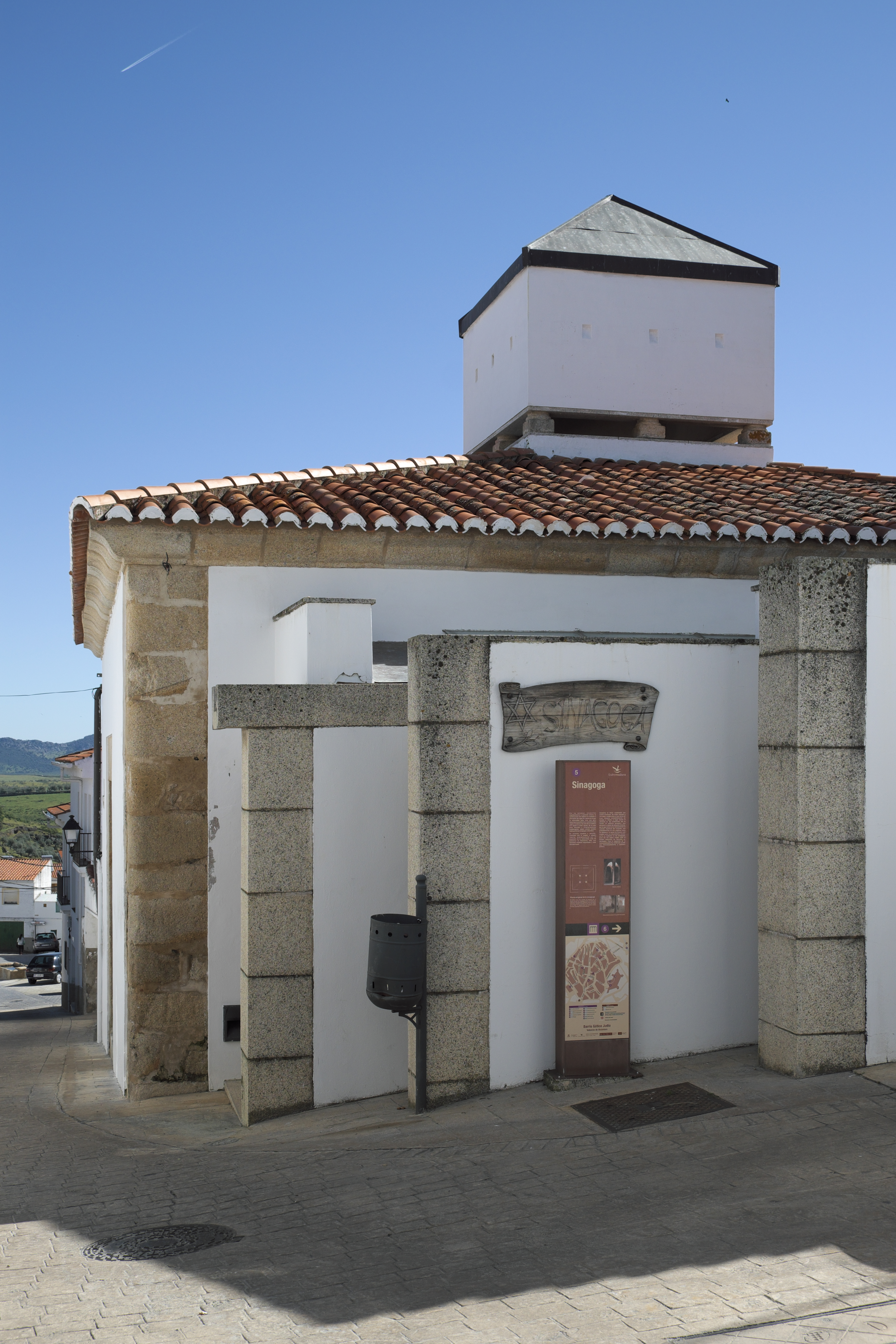
- View from outside, with the roof sloping off each of the four walls, in 2016

- Location of the former synagogue in Extremadura

Religion
- Affiliation: Judaism (former)
- Rite: Nusach Sefard
- Ecclesiastical or organizational status: Synagogue (15th century); Profane use (since 1492)
- Status: Abandoned (as a synagogue); Repurposed

Location
- Location: Valencia de Alcántara, Cáceres, Extremadura
- Country: Spain
- Interactive map of Valencia de Alcántara Synagogue
- Coordinates: 39°24′52″N 7°14′29″W

Architecture
- Type: Synagogue architecture
- Completed: 15th century

Specifications
- Length: 10 m (33 ft)
- Width: 10 m (33 ft)
- Materials: Masonry

The Valencia de Alcántara Synagogue (Spanish: Sinagoga de Valencia de Alcántara) is a former Jewish synagogue, located in Valencia de Alcántara, in the province of Cáceres, in Extremadura, Spain.

While no documentary evidence attests to the building being a synagogue, it was identified as such by academics Carmen Balesteros and Jorge Oliveira. Evidence included its dating from the late 15th century when Jews settled near the Portuguese border due to increased persecution in Castile, and its architectural similarity to the Synagogue of Tomar in Portugal. After the expulsion of Jews in 1492, it was used for various purposes, mainly as a slaughterhouse for swine.

== Location and design ==
The building is located in what was the Jewish quarter in the Middle Ages. The nineteen streets, of Gothic influences, have formed a Bien de Interés Cultural since 1997.

The square-shaped structure measures approximately ten by ten metres (thirty-three by thirty-three feet), and is made of whitewashed plastered masonry. The roof disperses rain in four directions, forming a pyramidal structure. The one entrance through the west side enters into the main prayer room, where there are four granite columns with Doric bases and capitals. Linking the columns are four semi-circular arches, which support the beams and the roof. The design is similar to the Synagogue of Tomar, a Portuguese structure of the same era.

According to historians Carmen Balesteros and Jorge Oliveira, the two doors which are no longer used due to new buildings, used to lead to a side hall and the women's prayer room. On the wall opposite the main entrance, there is a significant patch without plastering. According to the same academics, this is a tribute to the destruction of the Second Temple by the Roman Emperor Titus in 70 AD.

== History of the structure ==
Evidence including metal remains and a 13th-century Portuguese coin indicate that the building was first used as a forge. Another Portuguese coin from the mid-15th century in the foundation of the columns indicates that the building was likely first used as a synagogue around that time; the deteriorating political conditions for Jews in the Crown of Castile meant that a position on the border with Portugal was preferred in case of needing to flee. Its use was brief, as the Alhambra Decree was issued in 1492, expelling all Jews from the realm.

The former synagogue was deliberately burned in the 16th or 17th century. Evidence of animal bones indicates that it was then used as a slaughterhouse until the 20th century, when it was a garage, a tavern and a coal shed. Its time as a slaughterhouse would have been for the regional ham speciality, Jamón ibérico.

The identification of the structure as a synagogue by Balesteros and Oliveira was controversial in the field of Jewish medieval archaeology in the 1990s and early 2000s, as it was based entirely on material evidence, since no documentation attests that the building was used as such.

== See also ==
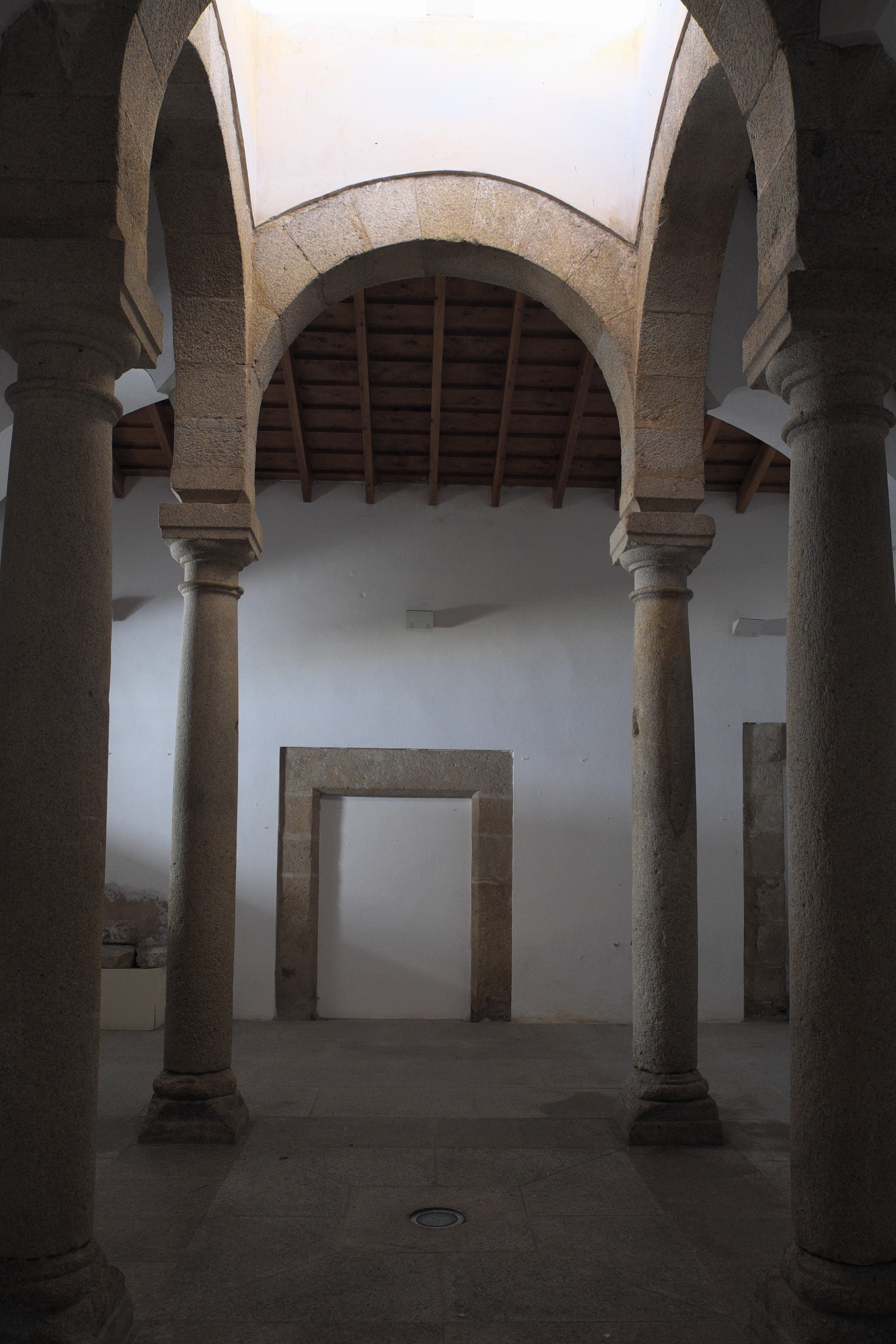
Interior view with the four columns, topped by arches. Note the former door on the far wall, and the deliberate patch without plaster to its left

- History of the Jews in Spain
- List of synagogues in Spain
