= John Burgoyne =

British Army officer, playwright and politician (1722–1792)

General The Right Honourable John Burgoyne
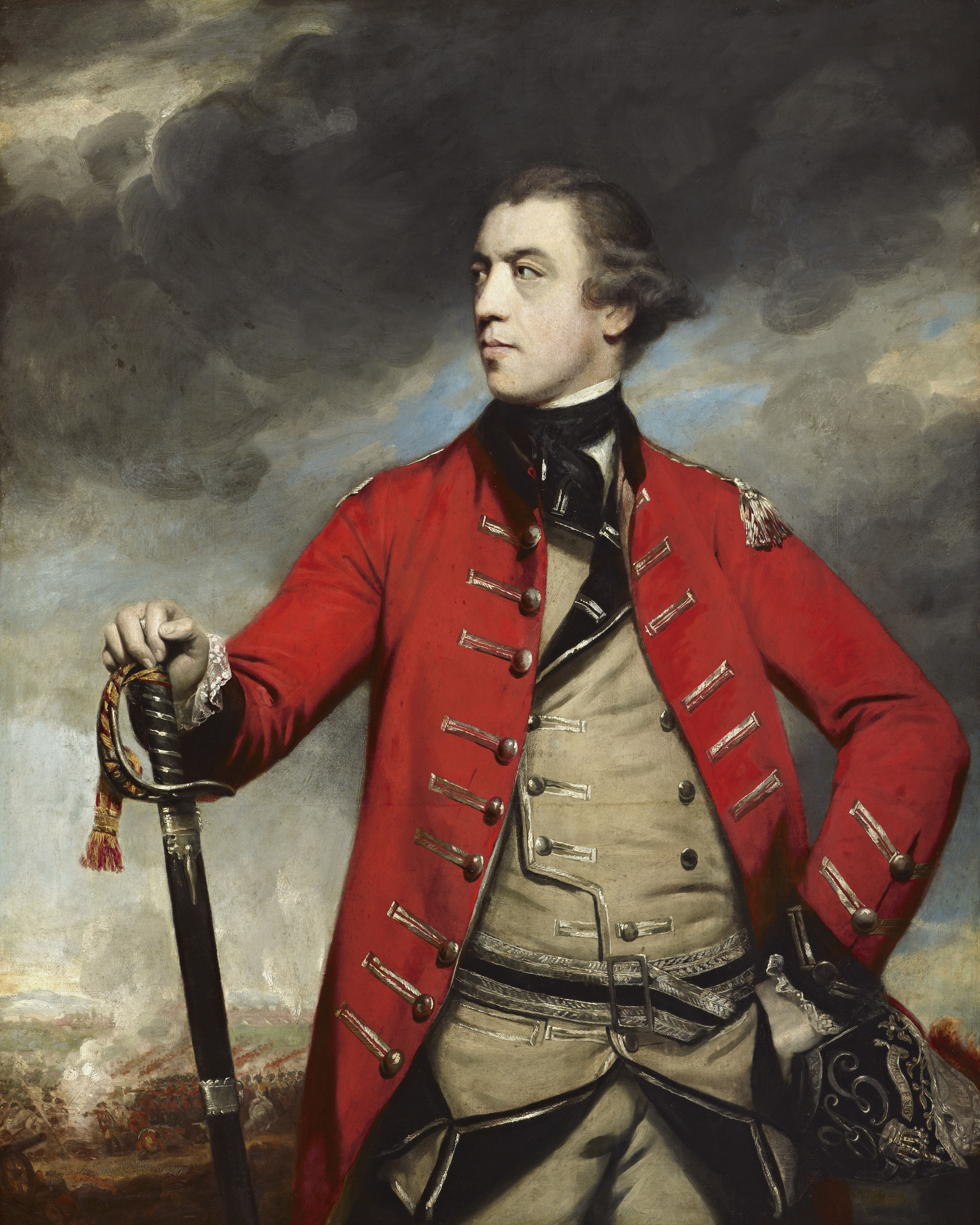
- Portrait of John Burgoyne by Joshua Reynolds, c. 1766
- Born: 24 February 1722; Sutton, Bedfordshire, Great Britain
- Died: 4 August 1792 (aged 70); Mayfair, London, Great Britain
- Burial place: Westminster Abbey
- Relatives: John Fox Burgoyne; Hugh Burgoyne VC; Geoffrey Hornby
- Military career
- Allegiance: Great Britain
- Branch: British Army
- Service years: 1737–1784
- Rank: General
- Nickname: Gentleman Johnny
- Commands: Commander-in-Chief, Ireland; 4th Regiment of Foot; Convention Army; Anglo-Canadian expeditionary force Governor of Fort William; Anglo-Portuguese expeditionary force Burgoyne's Light Horse
- Conflicts: War of the Austrian Succession; Seven Years' War; Raid on St Malo; Raid on Cherbourg; Battle of Saint-Cast; Battle of Belle Île; Spanish invasion of Portugal; Battle of Valencia de Alcántara; Battle of Vila Velha; American War of Independence; Siege of Boston; Invasion of Quebec; British counteroffensive; Saratoga campaign; Siege of Fort Ticonderoga; Battle of Freeman's Farm; Battle of Bemis Heights (POW)
- Awards: Privy Council of Great Britain
- Other work: Member of the House of Commons for Preston (Whig), Dramatist

Signature
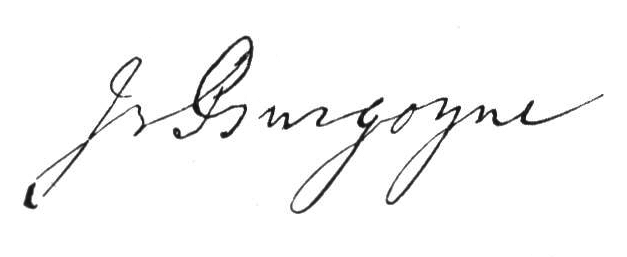

General John Burgoyne (24 February 1722 – 4 August 1792) was a British Army officer, playwright and politician who was a member of the House of Commons of Great Britain from 1761 to 1792. He first saw action during the Seven Years' War when he participated in several battles, most notably during the Spanish invasion of Portugal in 1762.

Burgoyne is best known for his role in the American Revolutionary War. He designed an invasion scheme and was appointed to command a force moving south from Canada to split away New England and end the rebellion. Burgoyne advanced from Canada but his slow movement allowed the Americans to concentrate their forces. Instead of coming to his aid according to the overall plan, the British Army in New York City moved south to capture Philadelphia. Burgoyne fought two small battles near Saratoga but was surrounded by American forces and, with no relief in sight, surrendered his entire army of 6,200 men on 17 October 1777. His surrender, according to the historian Edmund Morgan, "was a great turning point of the war, because it won for Americans the foreign assistance which was the last element needed for victory". France had been supplying the North American colonists since the spring of 1776. Burgoyne and his officers returned to England; the enlisted men became prisoners of war. He came under sharp criticism when he returned to London.

The rise of the politically friendly Shelburne ministry in 1782 saw a brief revival of his military career. He was appointed commander-in-chief of crown forces in Ireland and appointed colonel of the 4th Regiment of Foot. However the return to power of the Tories in 1784 marked the end of Burgoyne's active service. Burgoyne was also an accomplished playwright, known for his works such as The Maid of the Oaks and The Heiress, but his plays never reached the fame of his military career. He served as a member of the House of Commons for many years, sitting for the seats of Midhurst and Preston.

== Early life ==
=== Family and education ===
John Burgoyne was born in Sutton, Bedfordshire on 24 February 1722, son of Army officer Captain John Burgoyne (died 1768; son of Sir John Burgoyne, 3rd Baronet), of Sherbourne, Warwickshire, and Anna Maria, daughter of Charles Burneston, a wealthy Hackney merchant. There were rumours that Burgoyne was in fact the illegitimate son of Lord Bingley, who was his godfather. When Bingley died in 1730, his will specified that Burgoyne was to inherit his estate if his daughters had no male offspring.

From the age of 10, Burgoyne attended the prestigious Westminster School, as did many British army officers of the time such as Thomas Gage, with whom Burgoyne would later serve. Burgoyne was athletic and outgoing and enjoyed life at the school where he made numerous important friends, in particular Lord James Strange. In August 1737, Burgoyne purchased a commission in the Horse Guards, a fashionable cavalry regiment. They were stationed in London and his duties were light, allowing him to cut a figure in high society. He soon acquired the nickname "Gentleman Johnny" and became well known for his stylish uniforms and general high living which saw him run up large debts. In 1741 Burgoyne sold his commission, possibly to settle gambling debts.

The outbreak of the War of the Austrian Succession led to an expansion in the size of the British Army. In April 1745, Burgoyne joined the newly raised 1st Royal Dragoons as a cornet, a commission he did not have to pay for as it was newly created. In April 1745, he was promoted to lieutenant. In 1747, Burgoyne managed to scrape the money together to purchase a captaincy. The end of the war in 1748 cut off any prospect of further active service.

=== Elopement ===
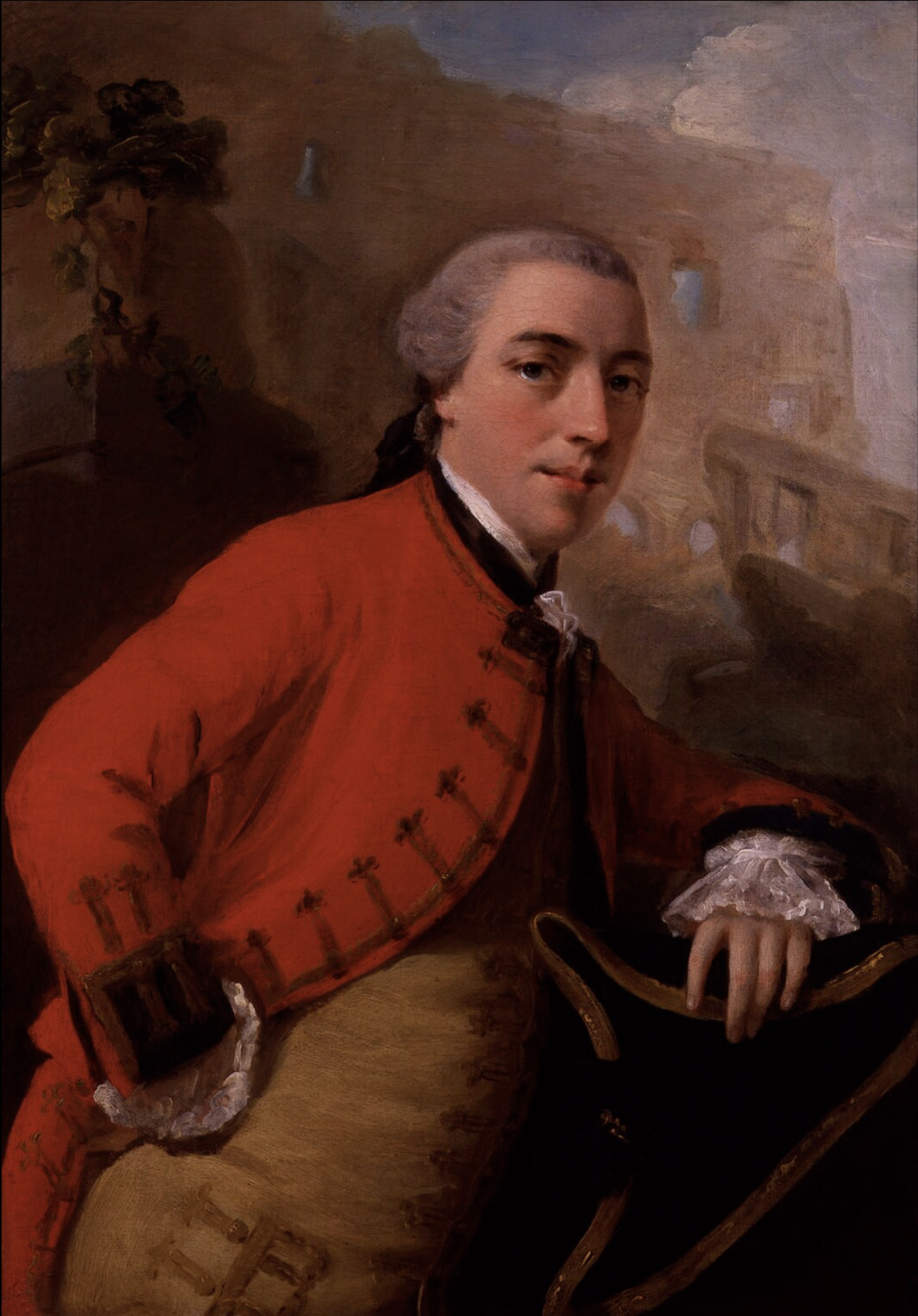
1758 portrait of Burgoyne

Through his friendship with Lord Strange, Burgoyne came to know Strange's sister, Lady Charlotte Stanley, the daughter of Lord Derby, one of Britain's leading politicians. After Derby refused permission for Burgoyne to marry Charlotte, they eloped together and married without his permission in April 1751. An outraged Derby cut his daughter off without a penny. Unable to support his wife otherwise, Burgoyne again sold his commission, raising £2,600, which they lived off for the next few years.

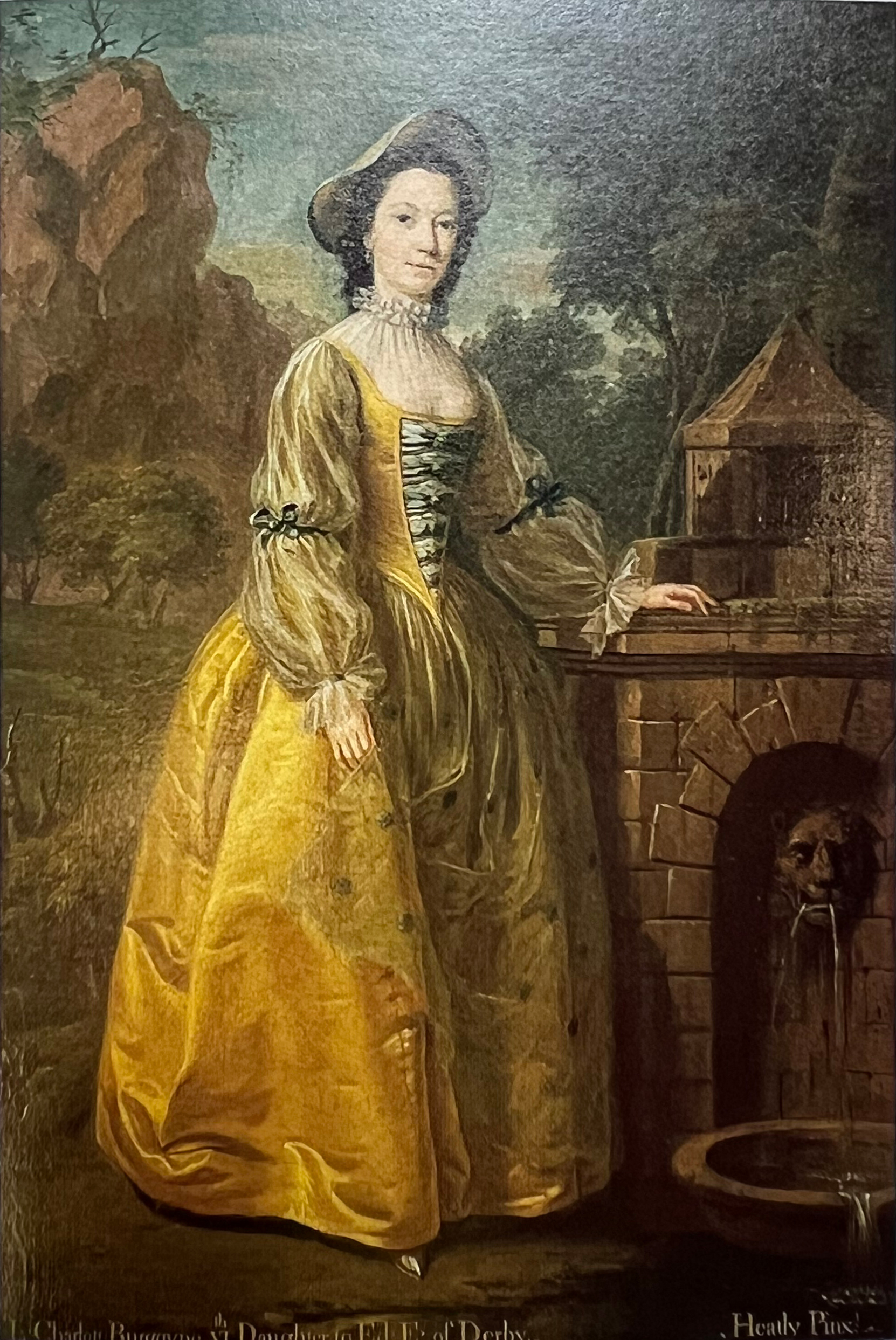
Lady Charlotte Stanley, by Edward Haytley (1746)

In October 1751, Burgoyne and his new wife went to live in continental Europe travelling through France and Italy. While in France, Burgoyne met and befriended the Duc de Choiseul who would later become the Foreign Minister and directed French policy during the Seven Years War. While in Rome, Burgoyne had his portrait painted by the British artist Allan Ramsay. In late 1754, Burgoyne's wife gave birth to a daughter, Charlotte Elizabeth, the couple's only child. In the hope that a granddaughter would soften Derby's opposition to their marriage, the Burgoynes returned to Britain in 1755. Lord Strange interceded on their behalf with Derby, who soon changed his mind and accepted them back into the family. Burgoyne soon became a favorite of Derby, who used his influence to boost Burgoyne's prospects.

As biographer Norman S. Poser states: 'In eighteenth-century England, an ambitious man without great wealth or a high position in society needed the help of a person or family as patron or sponsor. Burgoyne found his in the Stanley family.' Burgoyne’s personal life and professional trajectory remained inextricably bound with the Stanleys throughout his life.

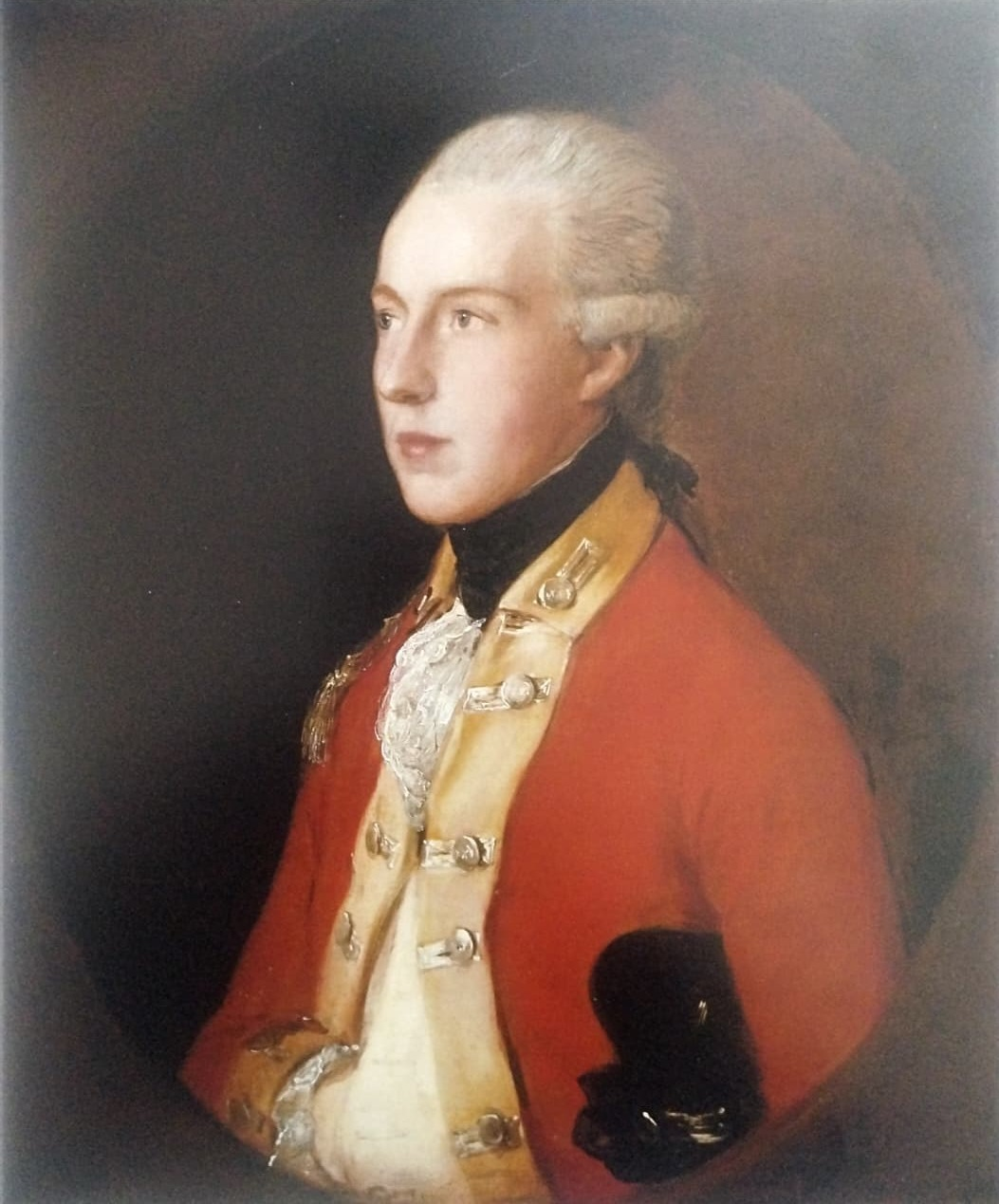
Captain John Stanley, an aide-de-camp to Burgoyne

Even the deaths of Lord Strange in 1771 and Lady Charlotte (Stanley) Burgoyne in 1776 did not loosen Burgoyne's ties to the Stanley family. Burgoyne acted as mentor and friend to Strange's son, Edward Smith-Stanley (later 12th Earl of Derby). Another cousin of his wife, Captain John Stanley, was made Burgoyne's aide-de-camp during the American Revolutionary War-including the Saratoga campaign-and when he was appointed Commander-in-Chief in Ireland. Poser argues this 'was also a way to repay the Stanley family for making his military and political career possible.'

== Seven Years War ==
A month after the outbreak of the Seven Years' War, Burgoyne bought a commission in the 11th Dragoons. In 1758, he became captain and lieutenant-colonel in the Coldstream Guards.

=== Raids on French coast and capture of Belle Île ===
In 1758, he participated in several expeditions against the French coast. During this period he was instrumental in introducing light cavalry into the British Army. The two regiments then formed were commanded by George Augustus Eliott (afterwards Lord Heathfield) and Burgoyne. This was a revolutionary step, and Burgoyne was a pioneer in the early development of British light cavalry. Burgoyne admired independent thought amongst common soldiers, and encouraged his men to use their own initiative, in stark contrast to the established system employed at the time by the British army.

In 1761, Burgoyne, as lieutenant-colonel-commandant of the sixteenth light dragoons, participated in the a British amphibious expedition to capture the French island of Belle Île off the Brittany coast. During the siege of the island's main citadel Le Palais, Burgoyne was entrusted with a negotiation for an exchange of prisoners.

=== Portuguese campaign ===
In 1761, he sat in parliament for Midhurst, and in the following year he served as a brigadier-general in Portugal which had just entered the war. Burgoyne won particular distinction by leading his cavalry in the capture of Valencia de Alcántara and of Vila Velha de Ródão following the Battle of Valencia de Alcántara, compensating for the Portuguese loss of Almeida. This played a major part in repulsing a large Spanish force bent on invading Portugal. Burgoyne's conduct during the invasion greatly impressed his superior; the Field Marshal Count La Lippe. La Lippe commissioned the 1766 portrait of Burgoyne by Joshua Reynolds and the painting was held by Lippe's descendants until 1943.

== Politics ==
In 1768, he was elected to the House of Commons for Preston as a Whig. For the next few years he occupied himself chiefly with his parliamentary duties, in which he was remarkable for his general outspokenness and, in particular, for his attacks on Lord Clive, known as Clive of India, who was at the time considered the nation's leading soldier. Burgoyne achieved prominence in 1772 by demanding an investigation of the East India Company, alleging widespread corruption by its officials and much later in life Burgoyne would take an active part in the Impeachment of Warren Hastings.

During the interwar years Burgoyne devoted much attention to art and drama (his first play, The Maid of the Oaks, was produced by David Garrick in 1775).

== American War of Independence ==
=== Early campaigns ===
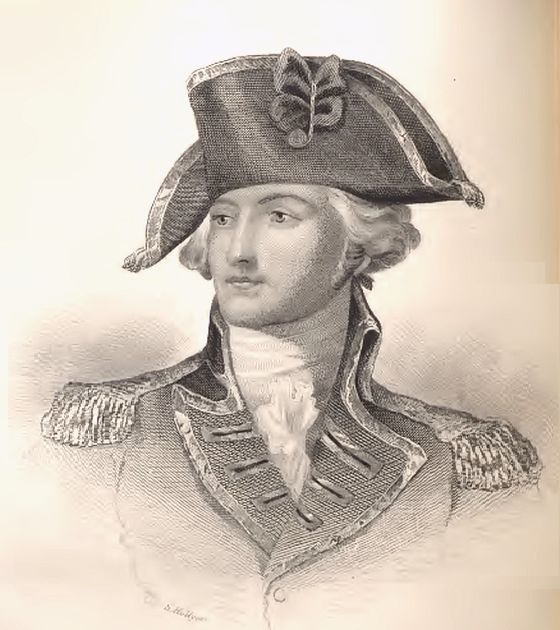
General John Burgoyne engraving by S. Hellyer, 1860

In the army, he had been promoted to major-general and made Governor of Fort William (commander of the major British Army garrison in Scotland). At the outbreak of the American Revolutionary War, he was appointed to command British reinforcements, and arrived in Boston in May 1775, a few weeks after the first shots of the war had been fired. He participated as part of the garrison during the Siege of Boston, although he did not see action at the Battle of Bunker Hill, in which the British forces, led by William Howe and Henry Clinton, won a pyrrhic victory against the Americans, with many British casualties. Frustrated by the lack of opportunities, he returned to England long before the rest of the garrison, which evacuated the city in March 1776.

In 1776, he was at the head of the British reinforcements that sailed up the Saint Lawrence River and relieved Quebec City, which was under siege by the American forces of Continental Army, seeking to bring Canada into the revolutionary cause. Under British General Guy Carleton Burgoyne led forces that expelled the Continental Army from the province of Quebec. Carleton then led the British forces onto Lake Champlain, but was, in Burgoyne's opinion, insufficiently bold when he failed to attempt the capture of Fort Ticonderoga after winning the naval Battle of Valcour Island in October.

=== Saratoga campaign ===
The following year, having convinced King George III and his government of Carleton's faults, Burgoyne was given command of the British forces charged with gaining control of Lake Champlain and the Hudson River valley. The plan, largely of his own creation, was for Burgoyne and his force to cross Lake Champlain from Quebec and capture Ticonderoga before advancing on Albany, New York, where they would rendezvous with another British army under General Howe coming north from New York City, and a smaller force that would come down the Mohawk River valley under Barry St. Leger. This would divide New England from the southern colonies, and, it was believed, make it easier to end the rebellion.

From the beginning, Burgoyne was vastly overconfident. Leading what he believed was an overwhelming force, he saw the campaign largely as a stroll that would make him a national hero who had saved the rebel colonies for the crown. Before leaving London, he had wagered Charles James Fox 10 pounds that he would return victorious within a year. He refused to heed more cautious voices, both British and American, that suggested a successful campaign using the route he proposed was impossible, as the failed attempt the previous year had shown.

Underlining the plan was the belief that Burgoyne's aggressive thrust from Quebec would be aided by the movements of two other large British forces under Generals Howe and Clinton, who would support the advance. However, Lord Germain's orders dispatched from London were not clear on this point, with the effect that Howe took no action to support Burgoyne, and Clinton moved from New York too late and in too little strength to be any great help to Burgoyne.

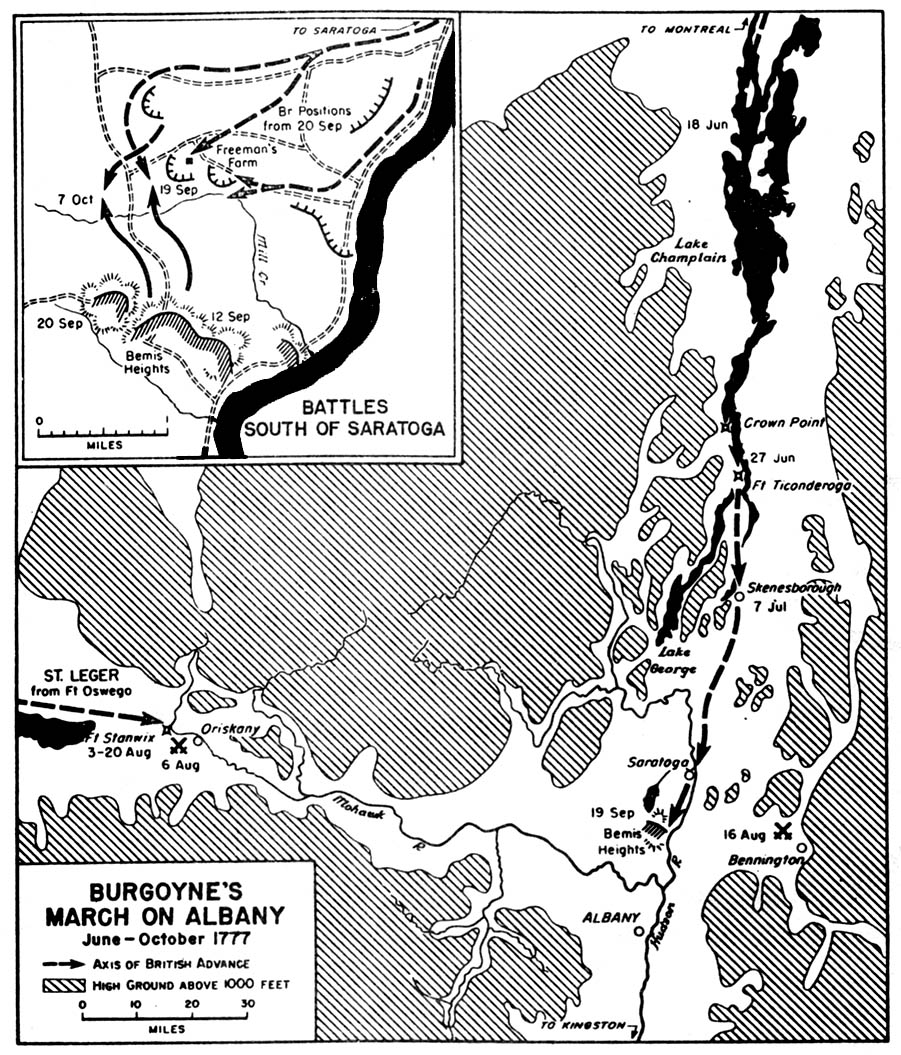
Burgoyne's march on Albany June–October 1777

As a result of this miscommunication, Burgoyne ended up conducting the campaign single-handedly. He was not yet aware that he would not be gaining additional support, and was still reasonably confident of success. Having amassed an army of over 7,000 troops in Quebec, Burgoyne was also led to believe by reports that he could rely on the support of large numbers of Native Americans and American Loyalists who would rally to the flag once the British came south. Even if the countryside was not as pro-British as expected, much of the area between Lake Champlain and Albany was underpopulated anyway, and Burgoyne was skeptical any major enemy force could gather there.

The campaign was initially successful. Burgoyne gained possession of the vital outposts of Fort Ticonderoga and Fort Edward, but, pushing on, decided to break his communications with Quebec. The news of the capture of Fort Ticonderoga was hailed in Britain as a great victory, which even King George III is said to have celebrated and Burgoyne was subsequently promoted to lieutenant-general. Burgoyne's force however was eventually hemmed in by a superior force led by American Major General Horatio Gates. Several attempts to break through the enemy lines were repulsed at Saratoga in September and October 1777. Benedict Arnold played a significant role in those battles. Burgoyne's aide-de-camp Sir Francis Clerke was killed on 15 October. On 17 October 1777, Burgoyne surrendered his entire army, numbering 5,800. This was the greatest victory the American forces had up to that point in the Revolutionary War, and it proved to be the turning point in the war, as France entered into an alliance with the American Patriots. Burgoyne's journey through the wilderness of New York was hampered by his insistence of bringing 30 carriages of fine clothes and champagne.

=== Convention Army ===
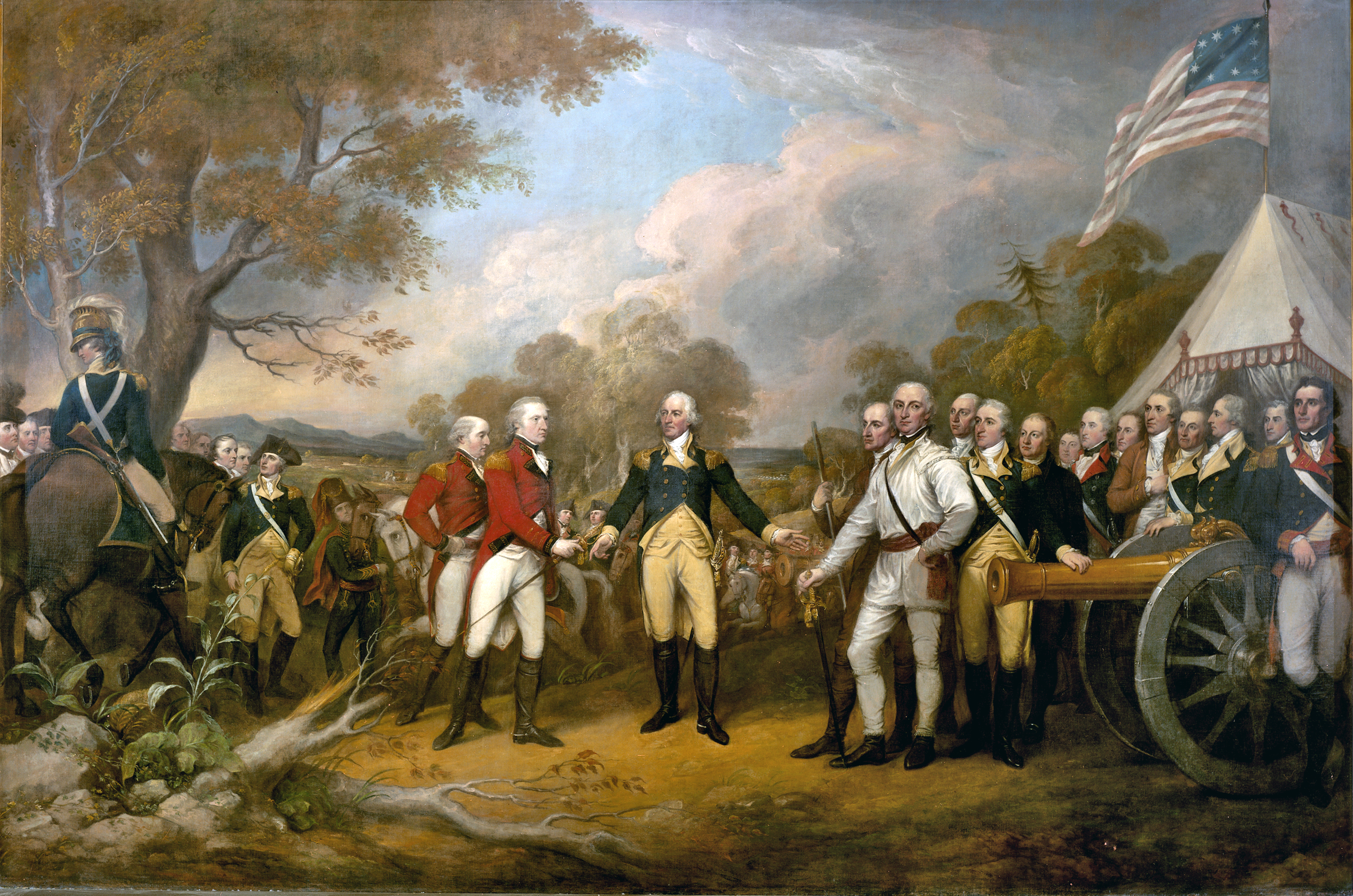
Surrender of General Burgoyne (John Trumbull, 1822)

Rather than an outright unconditional surrender, Burgoyne had agreed to a convention that involved his men surrendering their weapons, and returning to Europe with a pledge not to return to North America. Burgoyne had been most insistent on this point, even suggesting he would try to fight his way back to Quebec if it was not agreed. Soon afterwards the Continental Congress repudiated the treaty and imprisoned the remnants of the army in Massachusetts and Virginia, where they were sometimes maltreated. This was widely seen as revenge for the poor treatment that prisoners-of-war of the Continental Army had received while imprisoned.

Following Saratoga, the indignation in Britain against Burgoyne was great. He returned at once, with the leave of the American general, to defend his conduct and demanded but never obtained an inquiry. He was deprived of his regiment and the governorship of Fort William in Scotland, which he had held since 1769. The government demanded that Burgoyne at once return to America to re-join the Convention Army and continue negotiations for its return. When Burgoyne refused he was gazetted out of the army with loss of rank; a rare public rebuke of a high-ranking officer for which Burgoyne received widespread ridicule in Britain. He was not formally re-instated to the army until 1782 when the Whigs returned to power. Following the defeat, France recognised the United States and formally entered the war on 6 February 1778, transforming it into a global conflict.

Although Burgoyne at the time was widely held to blame for the defeat, historians have over the years shifted responsibility for the disaster at Saratoga to Lord Germain, the Secretary of State for the Colonies. Germain had overseen the overall strategy for the campaign and had significantly neglected to order General Howe to support Burgoyne's invasion, instead leaving him to believe that he was free to launch his own attack on Philadelphia.

== Later life ==
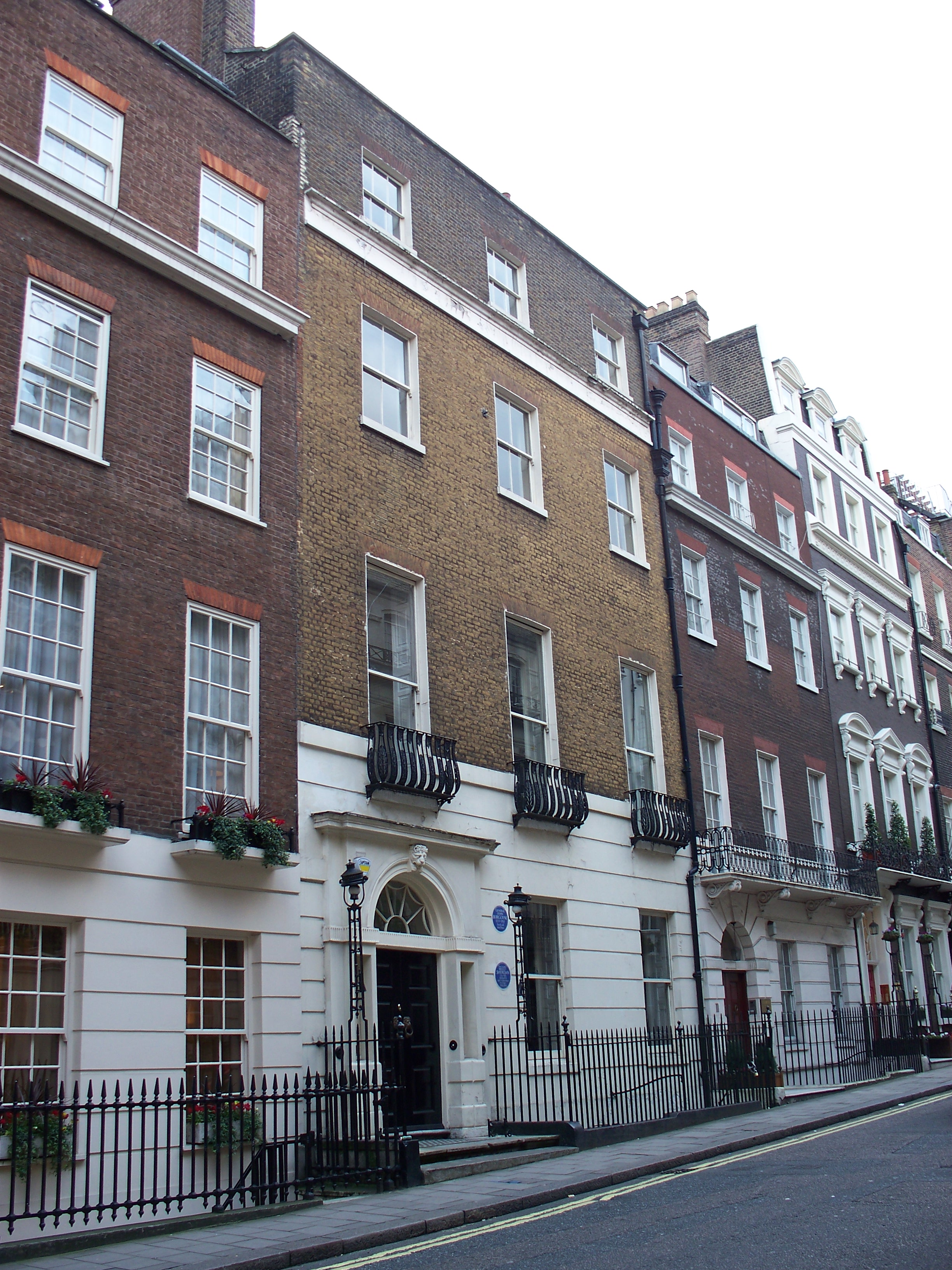
10 Hertford Street, London W1, Burgoyne's home in later life

Although elected as a Whig Burgoyne had been a supporter of the North government. Following his return from Saratoga he began to associate with the Rockingham Whigs. In 1782 when his political friends came into office, Burgoyne was restored to his rank, given the colonelcy of the King's Own Royal Regiment, made commander-in-chief in Ireland and appointed a privy councillor. After the fall of the Rockingham government in 1783, Burgoyne withdrew more and more into private life. His last public service was his participation in the impeachment of Warren Hastings. He died unexpectedly on 4 August 1792 at his home in Mayfair, after having been seen the previous night at the theatre in apparent good health. Burgoyne is buried in Westminster Abbey, in the North Walk of the Cloisters.

After the death of his wife in 1776, Burgoyne had four children by his mistress Susan Caulfield; one was Field Marshal John Fox Burgoyne, father of Hugh Talbot Burgoyne, VC. A grandchild of Burgoyne, Admiral Geoffrey Hornby was notable in helping to avert a war between the United States and Great Britain in the 19th century.

== Dramatist ==
In his time Burgoyne was a notable playwright, writing a number of popular plays. The most notable were The Maid of the Oaks (1774) and The Heiress (1786). He assisted Richard Brinsley Sheridan in his production of The Camp, which he may have co-authored. He also wrote the libretto for William Jackson's only successful opera, The Lord of the Manor (1780). He also wrote a translated semi-opera version of Michel-Jean Sedaine's work Richard Coeur de lion with music by Thomas Linley the elder for the Drury Lane Theatre where it was very successful in 1788. Had it not been for his role in the American War of Independence, Burgoyne would most likely be foremost remembered today as a dramatist.

=== Works ===
- The Dramatic and Poetical Works of the Late Lieut. Gen. J. Burgoyne, London 1808. Facsimile ed., 2 vols. in 1, 1977, Scholars' Facsimiles & Reprints, ISBN 978-0-8201-1285-5.
- The Maid of the Oaks (1774), staged by David Garrick with music by François Barthélemon
- The Blockade of Boston (1776), a satire on the conduct of the war, written during the Siege of Boston
- The Camp (1778) possible collaboration with Sheridan
- The Lord of the Manor (1780)
- The Heiress (1786)
- Richard Coeur de Lion (1786)
- Credited with writing the lyrics to Dashing White Sergeant

== Legacy ==
Burgoyne has often been portrayed by historians and commentators as a classic example of the marginally-competent aristocratic British general who acquired his rank by political connections, rather than ability. However, accounts of those that served under him, particularly that of Corporal Roger Lamb, noted that Burgoyne "shunned no danger; his presence and conduct animated the troops (for they greatly loved their general)." Accounts of the lavish lifestyle that he maintained on the Saratoga campaign, combined with a gentlemanly bearing and his career as a playwright led less-than-friendly contemporaries to caricature him, as the historian George Billias wrote, "a buffoon in uniform who bungled his assignments badly." Much of the historical record, Billias noted, is based upon those characterisations. Billias considered Burgoyne to be a ruthless and risk-taking general with a keen perception of his opponents and also a perceptive social and political commentator.

Burgoyne has made appearances as a character in historical and alternative history fiction. He appears as a character in George Bernard Shaw's play The Devil's Disciple and its 1959 and 1987 film adaptions, portrayed by Laurence Olivier and Ian Richardson respectively. Historical novels by Chris Humphreys that are set during the Saratoga campaign also feature him, and alternate or mystical history versions of his campaign are featured in For Want of a Nail by Robert Sobel and the 1975 CBS Radio Mystery Theater play Windandingo.

== See also ==
- List of American Revolutionary War battles

== Sources ==
- Bicheno, Hugh (2003). Rebels and Redcoats: The American Revolutionary War. HarperCollins. ISBN 978-0-00-715625-2.
- Billias, George Athan (1969). George Washington's Opponents. New York: William Morrow. OCLC 11709.
- Burgoyne, John. Burgoyne and the Saratoga Campaign: His Papers, Douglas R. Cubbison. Norman: University of Oklahoma Press 2012.
- Chisholm, Hugh, ed. (1911). "Burgoyne, John" . Encyclopædia Britannica. Vol. 4 (11th ed.). Cambridge University Press. pp. 819–820.
- Doderer-Winkler, Melanie (2013). Magnificent Entertainments: Temporary Architecture for Georgian Festivals. Yale University Press. ISBN 978-0-300-18642-0.
- Harvey, Robert (2001). A Few Bloody Noses. Little, Brown Book Group. ISBN 978-1-4721-0796-1.
- Mintz, Max M. (1990). The Generals of Saratoga: John Burgoyne and Horatio Gates. Yale University Press. ISBN 978-0-300-05261-9.
- Morgan, Edmund S. (1956). The Birth of the Republic 1763–1789.
- Nickerson, Hoffman (1967) [1928]. The Turning Point of the Revolution. Port Washington, NY: Kennikat. OCLC 549809.
- O'Shaughnessy, Andrew Jackson (2013). The Men Who Lost America: British Leadership, the American Revolution, and the Fate of the Empire. Yale University Press. ISBN 978-0-300-19107-3. pp 123–164.
- Stephens, Henry Morse (1886). "Burgoyne, John (1722–1792)" . In Stephen, Leslie (ed.). Dictionary of National Biography. Vol. 7. London: Smith, Elder & Co. pp. 340–342.
- Stokesbury, James (1979). "Burgoyne, John". In Halpenny, Francess G. (ed.). Dictionary of Canadian Biography. Vol. IV (1771–1800) (online ed.). University of Toronto Press.
- Thomson, Peter (2006). The Cambridge Introduction to English Theatre, 1660–1900. Cambridge University Press. ISBN 978-0-521-83925-9.

Parliament of Great Britain
Preceded by Sir John Peachey, Bt; John Sargent	Member of Parliament for Midhurst; 1761–1768; With: William Hamilton 1761–1765; Bamber Gascoyne 1765–1768	Succeeded by Lord Stavordale; Hon. Charles James Fox
Preceded by Sir Peter Leicester, Bt; Sir Frank Standish, Bt	Member of Parliament for Preston; 1768–1792; With: Sir Henry Hoghton, Bt	Succeeded by Sir Henry Hoghton, Bt; William Cunliffe Shawe
Military offices
Preceded by William Kingsley	Governor of Fort William; 1769–1779	Succeeded by Hon. John Vaughan
Preceded by Sir John Irwin	Commander-in-Chief, Ireland; 1782–1784	Succeeded by Sir William Augustus Pitt
Preceded by Studholme Hodgson	Colonel of the 4th (The King's Own) Regiment of Foot; 1782–1792	Succeeded by George Morrison
