= Lady of the manor (disambiguation) =

Lady of the manor is a title of a mediaeval land-holder.

Lady of the manor may also refer to:

- Lady of the Manor (film), a 2021 film
- Lady of the Manor (solitaire), a card game

== See also ==
- Lord of the Manor (disambiguation)
