= Coxheath Camp =

Historic military camp in Kent, England

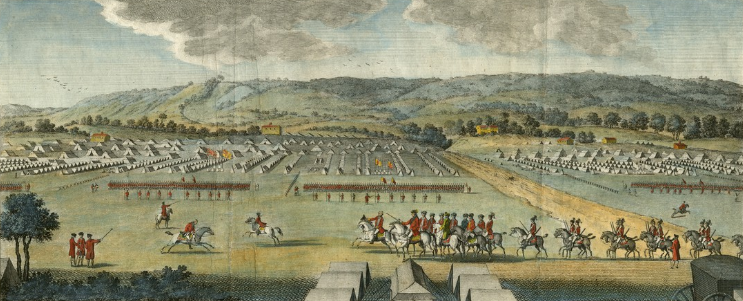
Coxheath Camp in 1778

Coxheath Camp was a military encampment located close to the village of Coxheath near Maidstone in Kent. During the Seven Years' War, American War of Independence and Napoleonic Wars it was a significant base for the British Army preparing for threatened invasions by France.

In 1756, fearing an invasion from France, Britain deployed a large number of Hanoverian auxiliaries in the area. it became a source of controversy with Patriot Whigs such as William Pitt. In September this came to a head when a soldier was arrested by local authorities.

In 1778 when France formed an alliance with American rebels, Britain was again in danger of invasion. Coxheath was one of a number of large camps formed in Southern England, with others at Warley, Brighton and Bury St Edmunds. Although the threat lasted until 1782, the major attempt to invade Britain, the Franco-Spanish Armada of 1779, was a distinct failure. Instead the camp became known for its fashionable social life as members of high society were frequently seen there.

== Popular culture ==
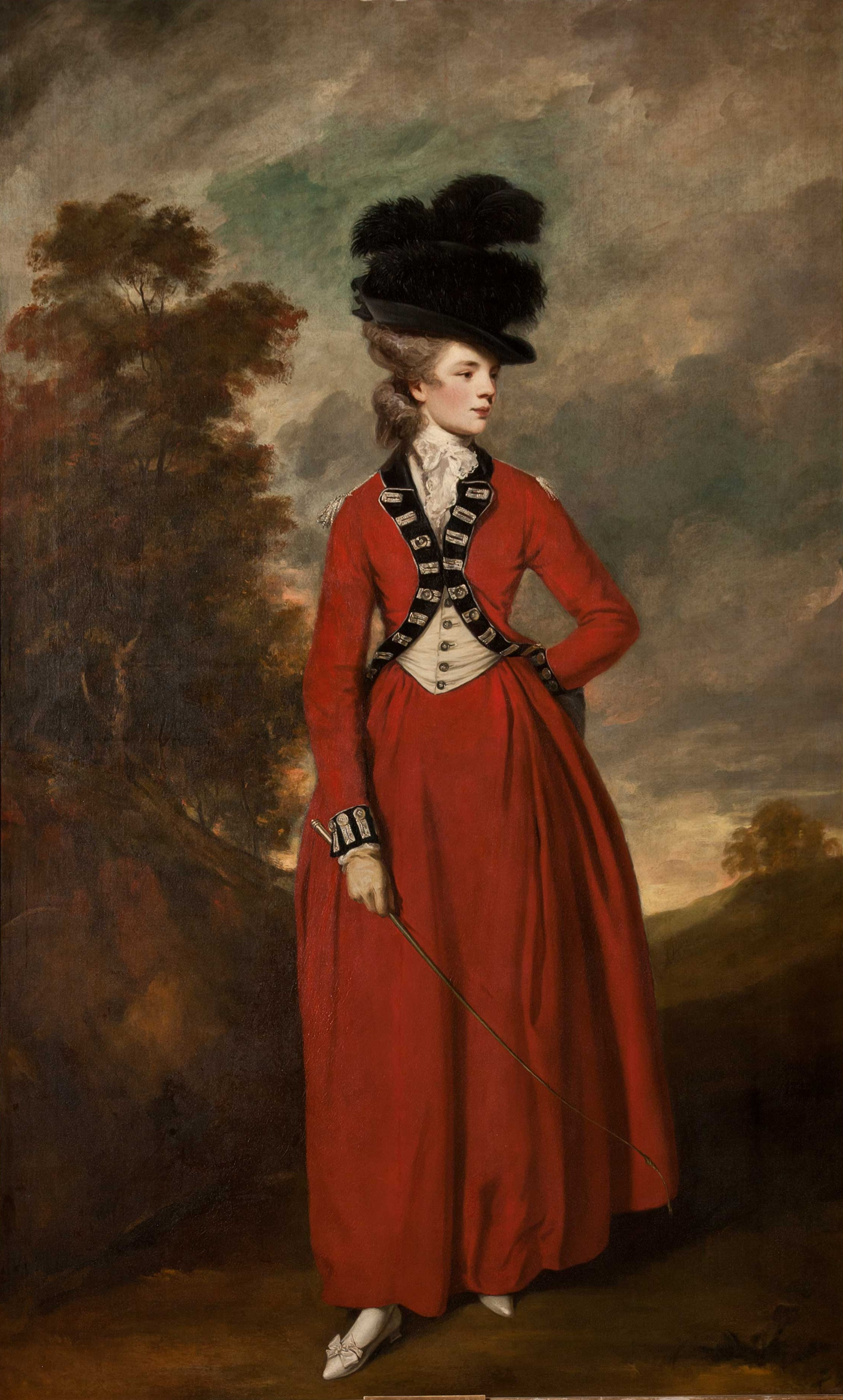
Portrait of Lady Worsley by Joshua Reynolds, 1779

The camp featured in paintings and particularly charicatures of the era, Richard Brinsley Sheridan wrote and staged the comedy play The Camp at the Theatre Royal, Drury Lane in 1778. The 1779 painting Portrait of Lady Worsley by Joshua Reynolds was inspired by her presence at Coxheath.

== Bibliography ==
- Cardwell, M. John. Arts and Arms: Literature, Politics and Patriotism During the Seven Years War. Manchester University Press, 2004.
- Jones, Robert W. Literature, Gender and Politics in Britain During the War for America, 1770-1785. Cambridge University Press, 2011.
- McCormack, Matthew. Embodying the Militia in Georgian England. Oxford University Press, 2015.
- Thomson, Peter. The Cambridge Introduction to English Theatre, 1660-1900. Cambridge University Press, 2006.
