= The Maid of the Oaks =

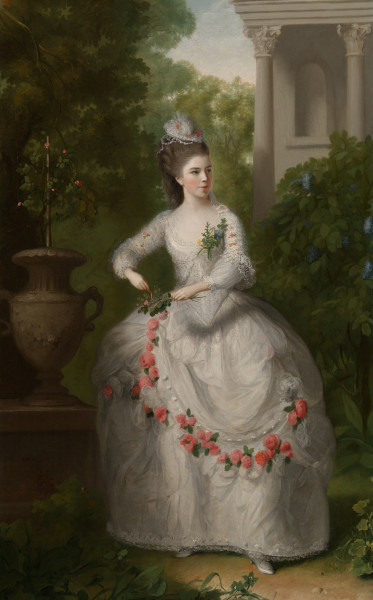
Frances Abington, as Lady Bab Lardoon in 'The Maid of the Oaks' by Thomas Hickey now in the Garrick Club

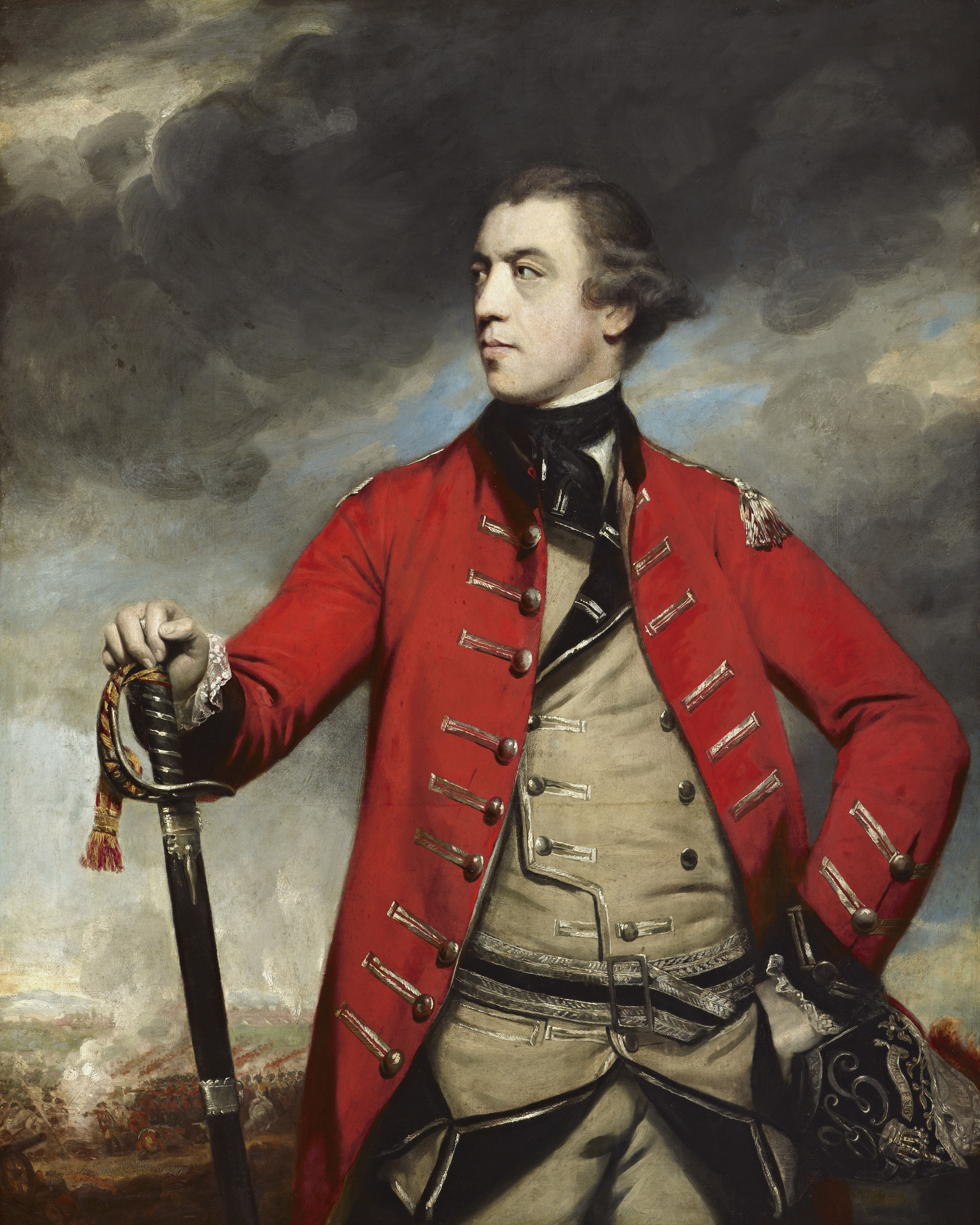
Portrait of John Burgoyne. The play's author painted by Joshua Reynolds in 1766.

The Maid of the Oaks is a comedy play by the British playwright and soldier General John Burgoyne.

The set designs were by the artist Philip James de Loutherbourg. The transparent scenery was lauded by the Westminster Magazine in its review although the critic was not impressed by the play. It was Burgoyne's first work, and he went on to write three further plays following his service in the American War of Independence.

The Oaks was demolished in the 1950s. The gardens and some of the remaining outbuildings form part of Oaks Park (London).

== Bibliography ==
- Doderer-Winkler, Melanie. "Magnificent Entertainments: Temporary Architecture for Georgian Festivals". London and New Haven, Yale University Press for The Paul Mellon Centre for Studies in British Art, 2013. ISBN 0300186428 and ISBN 978-0300186420.
- Nicoll, Allardyce. A History of English Drama 1660-1900. Volume III: Late Eighteenth Century Drama. Cambridge University Press, 1952.
- Russell, Gillian. Women, Sociability and Theatre in Georgian London. Cambridge University Press, 2007.
- Thomson, Peter. The Cambridge Introduction to English Theatre, 1660-1900. Cambridge University Press, 2006.
