= Valencia de Alcántara =

- Municipality
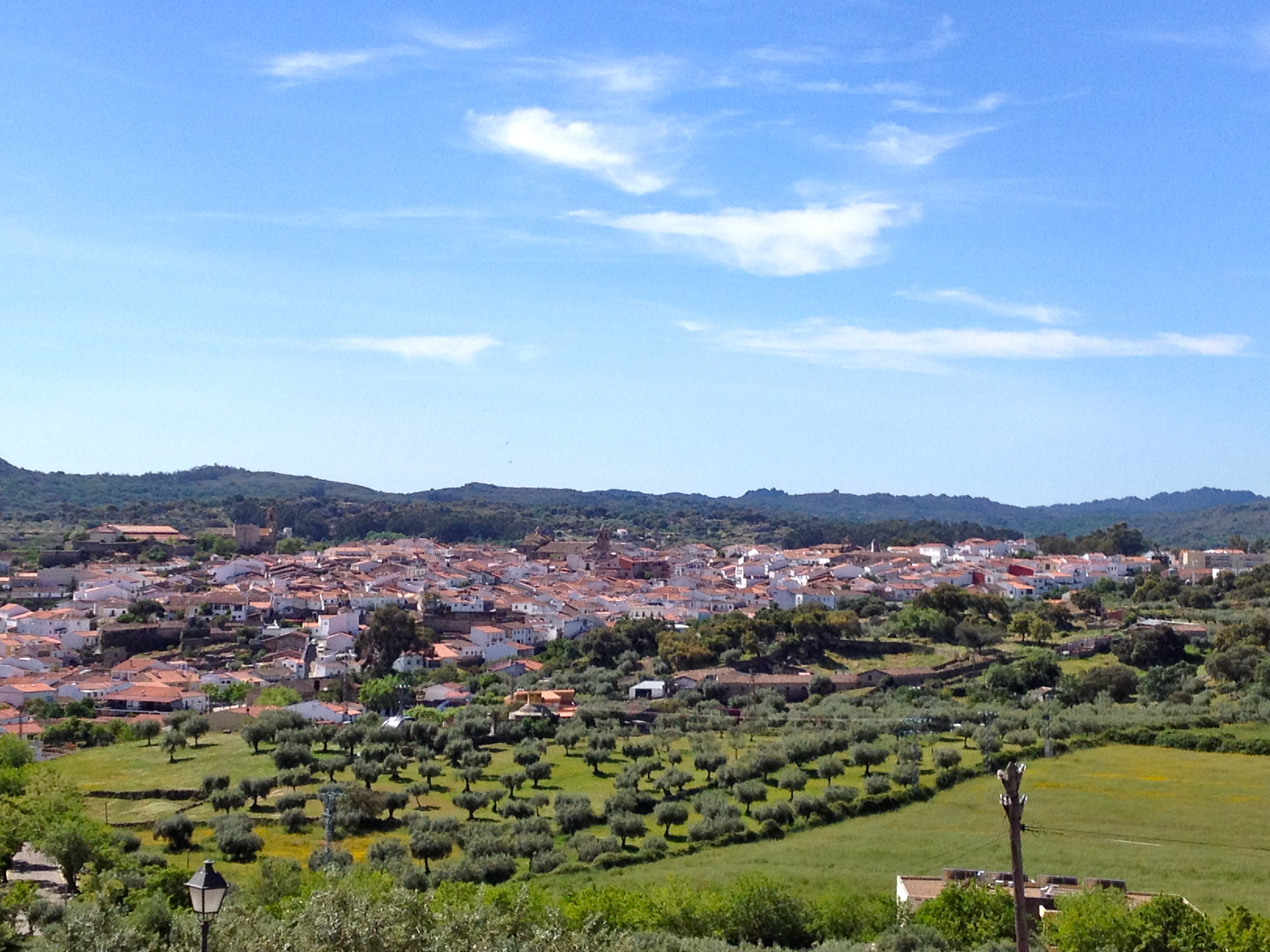
- General view

- Flag Coat of arms

- Location in Extremadura Valencia de Alcántara (Spain)
- Coordinates: 39°24′48″N 7°14′37″W
- Country: Spain
- Autonomous Community: Extremadura
- Province: Cáceres

Government
  - Mayor: Alberto Piris Guapo (PSOE)

Area
  - Total: 595 km^{2} (230 sq mi)
- Elevation (AMSL): 620 m (2,030 ft)

Population (2025-01-01)
  - Total: 1
  - Density: 0.0017/km^{2} (0.0044/sq mi)
- Time zone: UTC+1 (CET)
  - Summer (DST): UTC+2 (CEST (GMT +2))
- Postal code: 10500
- Area code: +34 (Spain) + 927 (Cáceres)
- Website: www.valenciadealcantara.es

Valencia de Alcántara (Spanish: [baˈlenθja ðe alˈkantaɾa]) is a municipality located in the province of Cáceres, in the autonomous community of Extremadura, Spain. It is near the Portuguese border (District of Portalegre), separated from it by the Sever.

== History ==
From the 16th century to the 18th Valencia was a celebrated border fortress; it was captured by the Portuguese in 1664 and 1698.

=== Battle of 1762 ===
The Battle of Valencia de Alcántara took place in 1762 as part of the Spanish invasion of Portugal. Portuguese-British troops under John Burgoyne attacked and captured the town, which was a Spanish supply base, setting back the invasion and contributing to the British victory that year.

=== Nineteenth century ===
The beginning of the nineteenth century, traditionally associated with the beginnings of the modern age, is particularly troublesome in the case of Valencia de Alcántara as it was caught up in two important conflicts, including the fleeting conflict known as the War of the Oranges (1801) or the War of Independence. However, due to its location it became is the second most important custom house for direct traffic between the two kingdoms, after Badajoz, and had a flourishing trade in farm produce of all kinds.

== Features ==
There are Roman remains in the district, and the courtyards and windows of many houses are Moorish in style. Nuestra Señora de Roqueamador, the most important church, dates from the 14th century. The church of Encarnacion, the town hall and a fine convent date from the 16th.

Valencia de Alcántara is a very important centre of dolmens in Europe.

== Famous inhabitants ==
- Valencia de Alcántara was the birthplace of Pedro Gómez Labrador, Marquis of Labrador, who represented Spain at the Congress of Vienna (1814–1815).
- Manolo Vital, the folk hero who 'hijacked' Barcelona's line 47 bus in 1978 to show authorities that busses could reach his mountainous neighborhood in Torre Baró district, Barcelona. Vital was born in Valencia de Alcántara, where his father was executed by Francoists, and in the 1950's immigrated to Barcelona along with many other inhabitants seeking work. His story is dramatized in the Goya award Best Picture, The 47.
- Soraya Arnelas was also born here in 1982.

== See also ==
- Valencia de Alcántara Synagogue
- List of municipalities in Cáceres
