= The Camp (play) =

1778 play

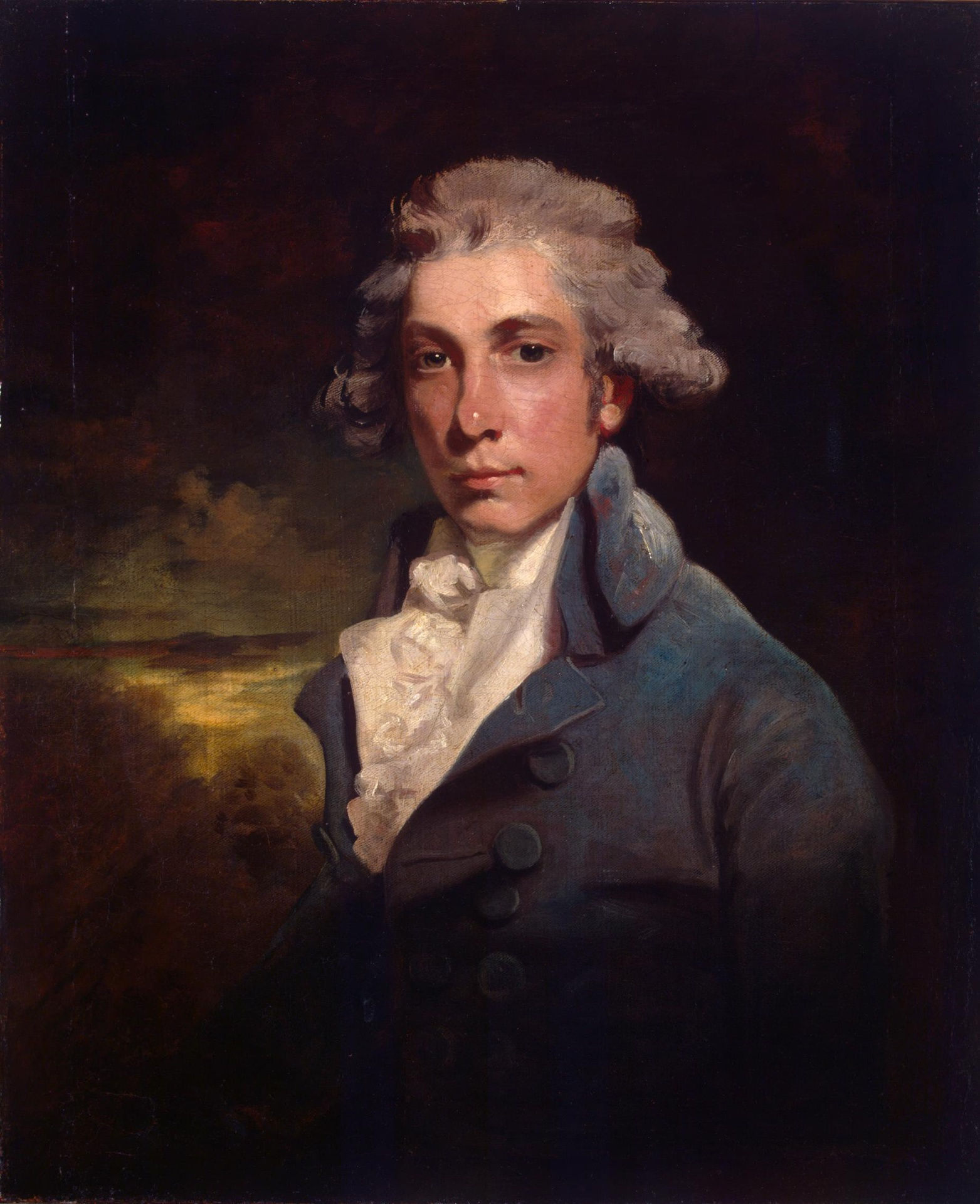
- Original language: English
- Written by: Richard Brinsley Sheridan
- Setting: Coxheath, present day

Premiere
- Date: 1778
- Place: Theatre Royal, Drury Lane, London

The Camp: A Musical Entertainment is a 1778 play by Richard Brinsley Sheridan, with assistance from John Burgoyne and David Garrick. The set designs were by Philip James de Loutherbourg. The play gently satirised the preparations of the British to organise home defences during the American War of Independence when an invasion of the British Isles by France, and later Spain, seemed imminent. It focuses on Coxheath Camp,, a military camp placed near Coxheath in Southern England. It premiered on 15 October 1778 at the Drury Lane Theatre.

The play was produced at a time when a genuine sense of crisis swept the country following France's entry into the war which culminated in the failed Armada of 1779. Because of his death while working on the play, Garrick is sometimes said to be the only casualty of the French invasion.

The play proved to be a hit. It was the most performed work at the Drury Lane Theatre during the 1778-1779 season, comfortably beating School for Scandal.

== Bibliography ==
- Ennis, Daniel J. & Slagle, Judith Bailey. Prologues, Epilogues, Curtain-Raisers and Afterpieces. Rosemont Publishing, 2007.
