= Portrait of John Burgoyne =

Painting by Joshua Reynolds

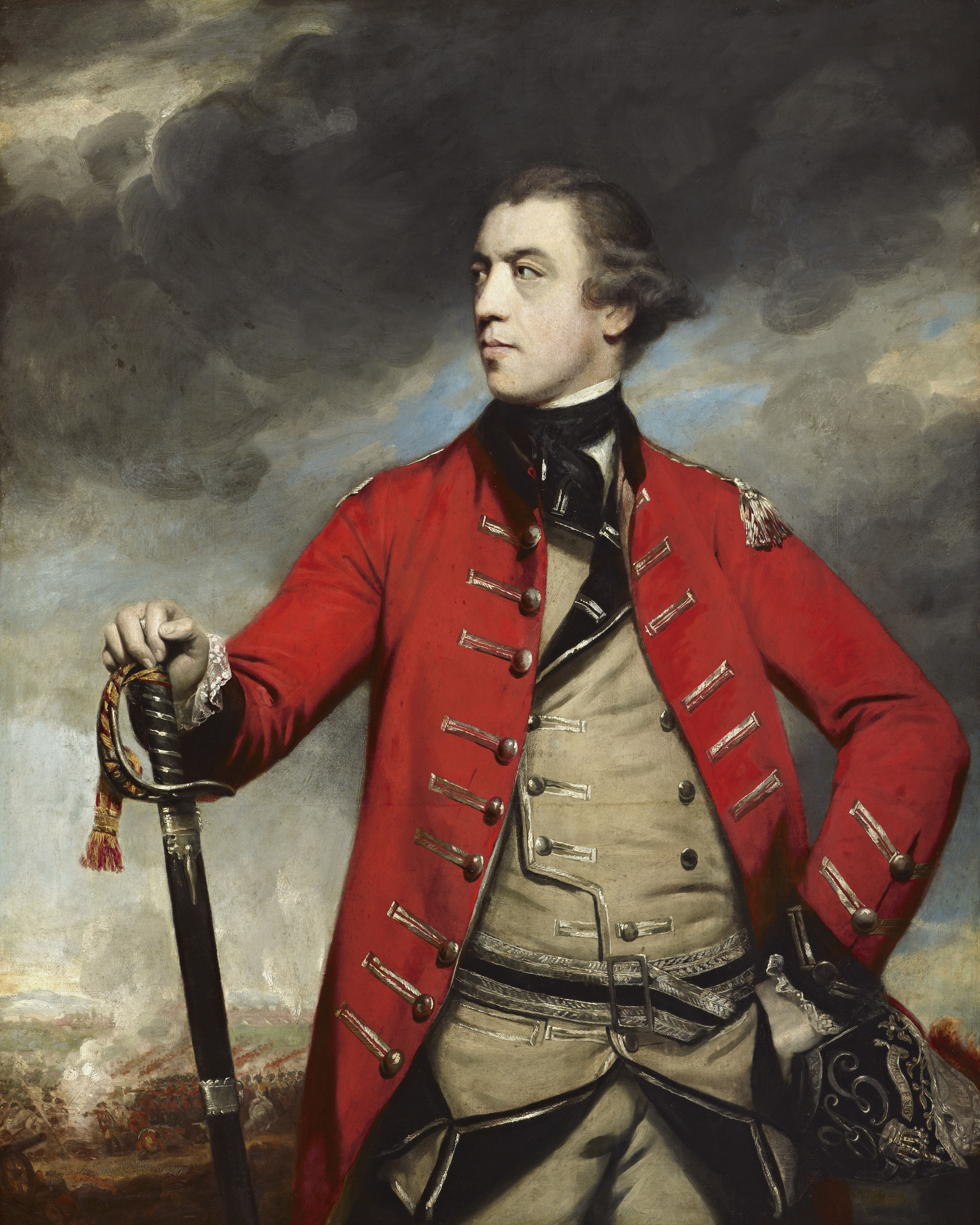
- Artist: Joshua Reynolds
- Year: 1766
- Type: Oil on canvas, portrait
- Dimensions: 127 cm × 101.3 cm (50 in × 39.9 in)
- Location: Frick Collection; New York City

Portrait of John Burgoyne is a 1766 portrait painting by the English artist Joshua Reynolds of the British soldier, politician and playwright John Burgoyne, best known for his later service in the American War of Independence.

== Sitter ==
At the time of painting Burgoyne had won distinction during the Seven Years' War in resisting the 1762 Spanish Invasion of Portugal. Since 1761 he had been Member of Parliament for Midhurst and in 1768 he won a hotly-contested election in Preston, a seat he held for the rest of his life.

Burgoyne would later become known for writing two plays The Maid of the Oaks (1774) and The Heiress (1786), both staged in London's West End. In 1777 he led a British Army south from Canada to capture Albany in New York but mislaid orders meant he was isolated at the Battle of Saratoga and forced to surrender to Horatio Gates, a former British officer now serving with the Continental Army. Burgoyne insisted that his troops become a Convention Army and be shipped back to Britain to continue fighting in the war, but the Continental Congress repudiated these terms and imprisoned the soldiers. Burgoyne was himself paroled and allowed to return home to defend his conduct.

== Painting ==
Reynolds was an established British portrait painter when he depicted Burgoyne. He was subsequently a driving force behind the creation of the Royal Academy in 1768 and served as its first President until 1792. Reynolds shows Burgoyne in military dress with sword. He wears the uniform of the Sixteenth Light Dragoons, a branch of the light cavalry. It was commissioned by his former commander in Portugal William, Count of Schaumburg-Lippe. He is silhouetted against a low horizon and stormy sky, a common feature of romantic art. In the background on the bottom left a battle is taking place. It is now in the Frick Collection in New York City having been acquired in 1943.

== See also ==
- Portrait of Banastre Tarleton, a 1782 portrait by Reynolds of another British participant in the American War of Independence.
- Surrender of General Burgoyne, an 1821 painting by John Trumbull depicting Burgoyne's surrender at Saratoga

== Bibliography ==
- Hargrove, Richard. General John Burgoyne. University of Delaware Press, 1982.
- O'Shaunhassey, Andrew Jackson. The Men Who Lost America: British Leadership, the American Revolution and the Fate of Empire. Yale University Press, 2013.
- Postle, Edward (ed.) Joshua Reynolds: The Creation of Celebrity. Harry N. Abrams, 2005.
- Ryskamp, Charles. Art in the Frick Collection: Paintings, Sculpture, Decorative Arts. Harry N. Abrams, 1996.
- Smith, Geoffrey & MacDonald, Deanna. 100 Best Paintings in New York. Interlink Publishing Group Incorporated, 2008.
- Thomson, Peter. The Cambridge Introduction to English Theatre, 1660–1900. Cambridge University Press, 2006.
