= The Lord of the Manor =

1780 comic opera

The Lord of the Manor is a comic opera by the British soldier and playwright John Burgoyne. It was first staged at the Drury Lane Theatre in December 1780. It was written by Burgoyne for his lover, the actress Susan Caulfield. It was performed at the Theatre Royal, Drury Lane.

== Bibliography ==
- Nicoll, Allardyce. A History of English Drama 1660-1900. Volume III: Late Eighteenth Century Drama. Cambridge University Press, 1952.
- Thomson, Peter. The Cambridge Introduction to English Theatre, 1660-1900. Cambridge University Press, 2006.
