= Távora =

Távora may refer to:

== People ==
- Távora (surname)

== Places ==
- Joaquim Távora
- Távora (Santa Maria e São Vicente)
- Távora (Tabuaço)
- Távora e Pereiro
- Santa Maria de Távora
- São Vicente de Távora

== Other ==
- Távora affair, political scandal in 18th-century Portugal
- Marquis of Távora, Portuguese noble title
- Távora River, river in Portugal
