= O Processo dos Távoras =

Historical fiction television series

O Processo dos Távoras (English: The Távora Affair) is a historical fiction television series produced by RTP, Antinomia Produções Vídeo and the Institute of Cinema, Audiovisual, and Multimedia (ICAM) in 2001. It was written by Francisco Moita Flores, based on the Portuguese political scandal that occurred during the reign of D. José, in 1758. The series had a prominent place at the International Television Festival in Venice 2002.

== Synopsis ==
Set in the 18th century, the series demonstrates the process (and politics) that led to the execution of the Távoras. In an environment of political and economic crisis, Portuguese King D. José is the victim of an attack on a September night when returning to Campo Real after meeting his mistress—the new Marchioness of Tavora, D. Teresa de Távora. The king instructs his minister Sebastião José de Carvalho e Melo to constitute a court in order to find, arrest and judge those responsible for the attempted regicide. The old nobility resisted the Enlightenment and sought to end it. It permanently changed the way of politics in Europe, as well as with the Society of Jesus. The families of the Duke of Aveiro and the Marquis of Tavora are accused, and find themselves falsely accused with no effective defense. The judgment for those directly involved was death, the most significant collective execution that Portugal has ever seen. Their public horror and humiliation forever marked Portuguese history.

=== The Epoch ===
The film takes place between September and December 1758. In a tense atmosphere marked by the fight of Joseph and his government for reforms that would allow Portugal to escape the misery that followed the Brazilian gold crisis, when gold shipments declined during the late reign of King John V and of his son. Resistance and surprise came from the old nobility, troubled by the emergence of mercantilist policies that arose from the Enlightenment. These ignored the traditional values of nobility and favor an economically-based logic of power. This discontent coupled with the change of social and political behavior put the Society of Jesus in conflict with D. José and the Marquis of Pombal, Sebastião José de Carvalho e Melo.

== Cast ==
- António Cordeiro – D. José I de Portugal
- João D'Ávila – Sebastião José de Carvalho e Melo
- Fernanda Lapa – D. Leonor Tomásia de Távora, 3.ª Marquesa de Távora
- Henrique Viana – D. Francisco de Assis de Távora, Third Marquis of Távora
- Júlio Cardoso – D. José de Mascarenhas da Silva e Lencastre, Duke of Aveiro
- Sofia Sá da Bandeira - Leonor de Almeida Portugal
- Marco D'Almeida -
- Lia Gama - Leonor
- João Lagarto – Juiz Cordeiro Pereira
- Victor Rocha - Pedro Teixeira
- Sofia Duarte Silva - D. Maria I de Portugal
- Luís Aleluia - Marquês de Alorna
- Manuel Moreira - Mindinho
- Flávia Gusmão - Mariana Teresa

== Episodes ==
Temp.	Episodes	Year of transmission	Day of the week	Main cast
1	13	2001	Domingo	António Cordeiro, João D'Ávila, Fernanda Lapa, Henrique Viana, Júlio Cardoso e João Lagarto
