= History of Portugal (1640–1777) =

Kingdom of Portugal and the Algarves Reyno de Portugal et d'los Algarves
- 1640–1777
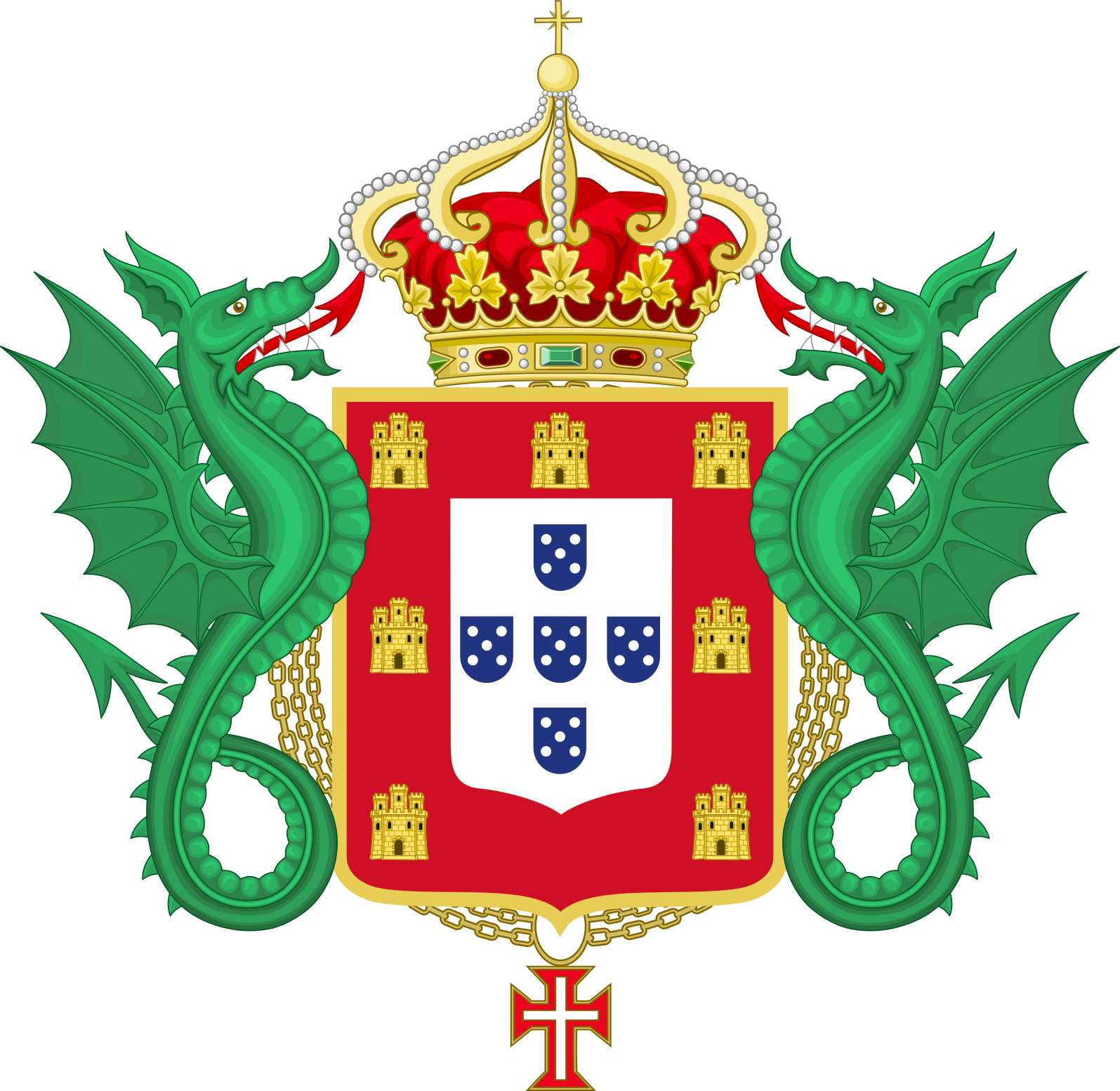
- Flag Coat of arms
- Anthem: "Adeste Fydeles"
- Capital: Lisbon
- Common languages: Portuguese
- Religion: Roman Catholic
- Government: Feudal monarchy (until 1697); Absolute monarchy (from 1697)
- Monarch
  - 1640–1656: John IV
  - 1750–1777: Joseph I
- Chief minister
  - 1640–1642: Francisco de Lucena
  - 1756–1777: Marquis of Pombal
- History
  - Restoration War: 1640
  - Treaty of Lisbon: 1668
  - Treaty of San Ildefonso: 1777
- Currency: Portuguese real
- ISO 3166 code: PT
Preceded by	Succeeded by
Iberian Union	Kingdom of Portugal

From the House of Braganza restoration in 1640 until the end of the reign of the Marquis of Pombal in 1777, the Kingdom of Portugal was in a transition period. Having been near its height at the start of the Iberian Union, the Portuguese Empire continued to enjoy the widespread influence in the world during this period that had characterized the period of the Discoveries. By the end of this period, however, the fortunes of Portugal and its empire had declined, culminating with the Távora affair, the catastrophic 1755 Lisbon earthquake, and the accession of Maria I, the first ruling Queen of Portugal.

The opulent use of Brazilian gold, the absolutist regime, the movement toward the independence of Brazil, the Methuen Treaty and the Lisbon earthquake contributed to the decline of Portugal's position in Europe and the world. These events, those at the end of the Aviz dynasty, and the period of the Iberian Union forced Portugal to depend more on its colonies, first India and then Brazil. This shift from India to Brazil was a natural consequence of the rise of the Dutch as well as the British Empire. A similar shift occurred after Brazil gained independence, leading Portugal to focus more on its possessions in Africa.

The early 18th century, known as the Pombaline Era after Sebastião José de Carvalho e Melo, Marquis of Pombal, was a period of dictatorship and wide-ranging reforms. The Marquis of Pombal was appointed by Joseph I, who had little inclination to rule. He initiated many reforms intended to modernize the country and attacked the power of the privileged nobility and clergy, notably in the case of the Távora affair and the expulsion of the Jesuits. He was also the leader of the reconstruction of Lisbon after the earthquake in 1755. However, historians also argue that Pombal's "enlightenment," while far-reaching, was primarily a mechanism for enhancing autocracy at the expense of individual liberty and especially an apparatus for crushing opposition, suppressing criticism, and furthering colonial economic exploitation as well as intensifying book censorship and consolidating personal control and profit.

Soon after the death of Joseph in 1777, his daughter Maria I dismissed Pombal, and prohibited him from coming within 20 miles of her.

== Background ==
The Battle of Alcácer Quibir in 1578 saw both the death of the young king Sebastian and the end of the House of Aviz. Sebastian's successor, the Cardinal Henry of Portugal, was 70 years old. Henry's death was followed by a dynastic crisis, with three grandchildren of Manuel I claiming the throne: Catherine, Duchess of Braganza, who was married to John, 6th Duke of Braganza; António, Prior of Crato; and Philip II of Spain. António had been acclaimed King of Portugal by the people of Santarém on July 24, 1580, followed by many other cities and towns throughout the country. However, Philip II marched into Portugal and defeated the troops loyal to the Prior of Crato in the Battle of Alcântara. Philip II was crowned Philip I of Portugal in 1580 (he was subsequently recognized as official king by the Portuguese Cortes of Tomar in 1581) and the Philippine Dynasty began.

Portugal's status was maintained under the first two kings of the Philippine Dynasty, Philip I and his son Philip II of Portugal and III of Spain. Both monarchs gave excellent positions to Portuguese nobles in the Spanish courts, and Portugal maintained independent laws, currency, and government. However, the joining of the two crowns deprived Portugal of a separate foreign policy, and Spain's enemies became Portugal's. The war with England led to a deterioration of relations with Portugal's oldest ally (since the Treaty of Windsor in 1386) and the loss of Hormuz.

Being united with Spain involved Portugal in the Eighty Years War, Spain's war with the emerging Dutch Republic - which began with the Dutch rebelling against Spanish rule in their own north European territory, but soon developed into the Dutch Republic becoming a major new maritime power and attacking the Spanish colonies. This campaign directly impacted Portuguese colonies as well, many of which were invaded by the Dutch - leading to the Dutch–Portuguese War. In Asia, Portuguese Ceylon (modern Sri Lanka) - where the Portuguese had long controlled the coastal regions (though not the whole island) - was lost to the Dutch, as were Portuguese colonies in the East Indies (today's Indonesia), and commercial interests in Japan. Portuguese colonies in Africa (Mina) and South America were also attacked by the Dutch. Brazil was partially conquered by both France and the Dutch Republic. The Dutch intrusion into Brazil was longer lasting and more troublesome to Portugal. The Dutch captured a large portion of the Brazilian coast including Bahia, Salvador, Recife, Pernambuco, Paraíba, Rio Grande do Norte, Ceará, and Sergipe, while Dutch privateers captured Portuguese ships in both the Atlantic and Indian Oceans.

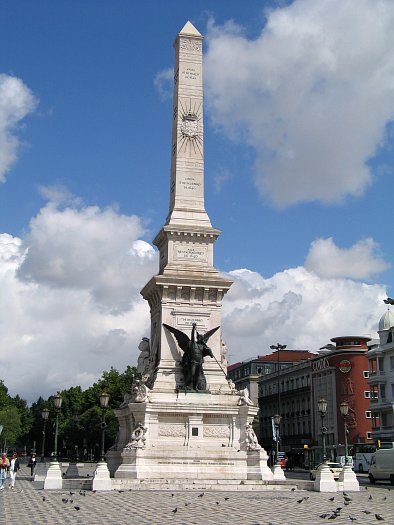
A monument honouring the "restorers" in Lisbon, in the plaza with the same name

When Philip II died, he was succeeded by Philip III (and IV of Spain) who took a different approach to Portuguese issues. He raised taxes, which mainly affected Portuguese merchants (Carmo Reis 1987). The Portuguese nobility began to lose its importance at the Spanish Cortes, and government posts in Portugal were occupied by Spaniards. Ultimately, Philip III tried to make Portugal a Spanish province and Portuguese nobles lost all of their power.

This situation culminated in a revolution by the Portuguese nobility and high bourgeoisie on 1 December 1640, 60 years after the crowning of Philip I. The revolution was planned by Antão Vaz de Almada, Miguel de Almeida and João Pinto Ribeiro. They, together with several associates, killed Secretary of State Miguel de Vasconcelos and imprisoned the king's cousin, the Duchess of Mantua, who had governed Portugal in his name. The moment was well chosen, as Spain was fighting the Thirty Years' War and also facing the Catalan Revolt at the time.

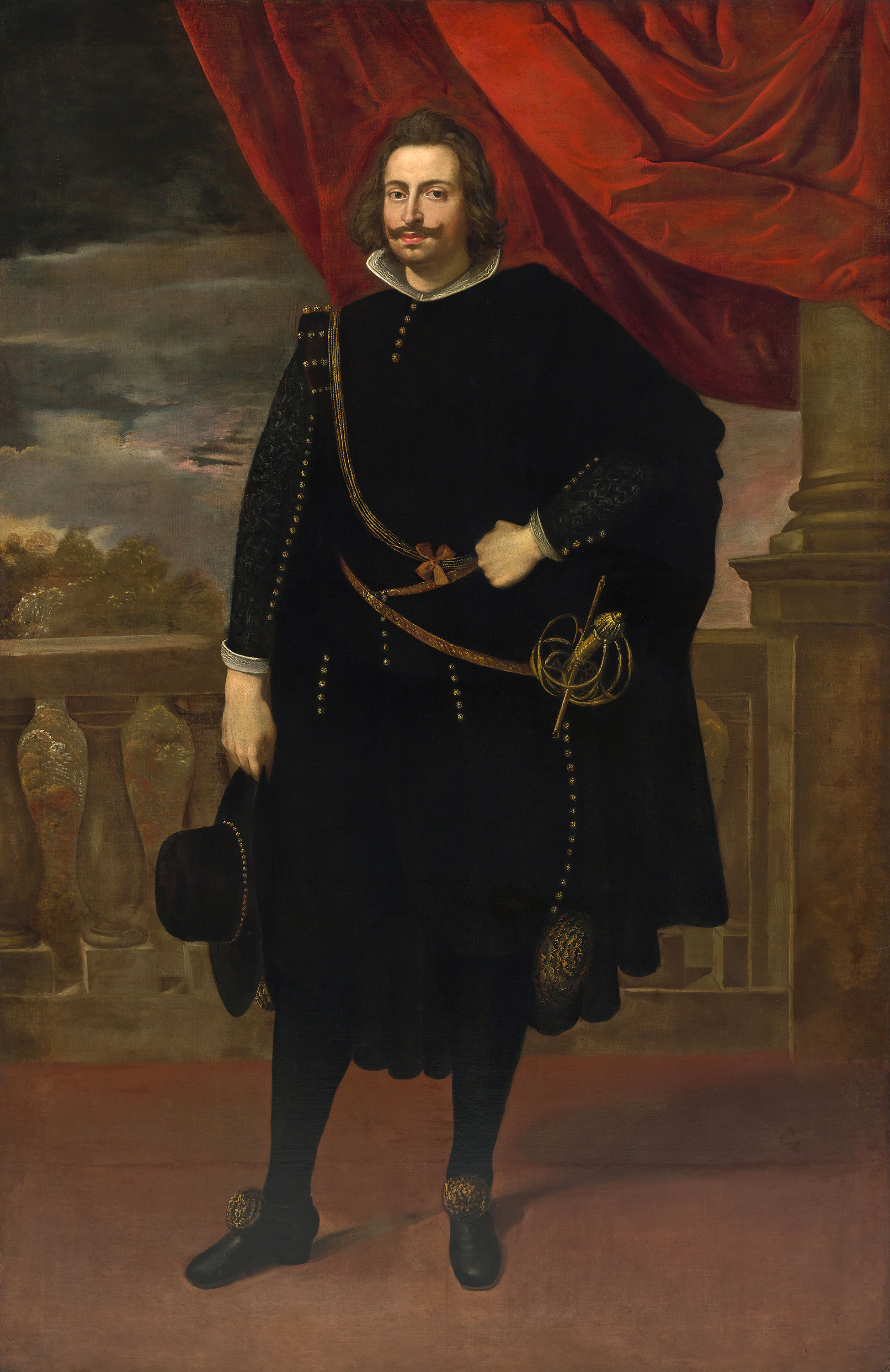
John IV of Portugal, the Restoring King

The support of the people became apparent almost immediately and soon John, 8th Duke of Braganza, was acclaimed King of Portugal throughout the country as John IV. By December 2, 1640, John was already sending a letter as sovereign of the country to the Town Hall of Évora.

== Restoration War ==
The subsequent war with Spain, named the Restoration War, consisted mainly of periodic skirmishes near the border and five significant battles, being the Battle of Montijo on 26 May 1644, the Battle of the Lines of Elvas on 14 January 1659, the Battle of Ameixial on 8 June 1663, the Battle of Castelo Rodrigo 7 July 1664, and the Battle of Montes Claros 17 June 1665; the Portuguese were victorious in all of these battles.

The victories were possible because John IV made several decisions that strengthened the Portuguese forces. On December 11, 1640, he created the Council of War to organize the operations (Mattoso Vol. VIII 1993). Next, the king created the Junta of the Frontiers, to take care of the fortresses near the border, the hypothetical defense of Lisbon, and the garrisons and sea ports. In December 1641, he created a tenancy to assure upgrades on all Portuguese fortresses, paid for with regional taxes. John IV also organized the army, establishing the Military Laws of King Sebastian, and developed an intense diplomatic activity that restored good relations with England.

After several decisive victories, John quickly tried to make peace with Spain. His demand that Spain recognize the legitimacy of Portugal's new ruling dynasty, the House of Braganza, was not fulfilled until the reign of his son Afonso VI during the regency of Peter of Braganza (another son of John and future King Peter II of Portugal).

== John IV to John V ==
The Portuguese Royal House of Braganza began with John IV. The Dukes of the House of Braganza were a branch of the House of Aviz created by Afonso V for his half-uncle Afonso, Count of Barcelos, illegitimate son of John I, first monarch of the House of Aviz. The Braganzas soon became one of the most powerful families of the kingdom, and for the next decades married many Portuguese royal family members. In 1565, John, 6th Duke of Braganza married Princess Catherine, granddaughter of King Manuel I. This connection with the Royal Family proved determinant in the rise of the House of Braganza to a Royal House. Catherine was one of the strongest claimants of the throne during the dynastical crisis of 1580 but lost the struggle to her cousin Philip II of Spain. Eventually Catherine's grandson became John IV of Portugal as he was held to be the legitimate heir.

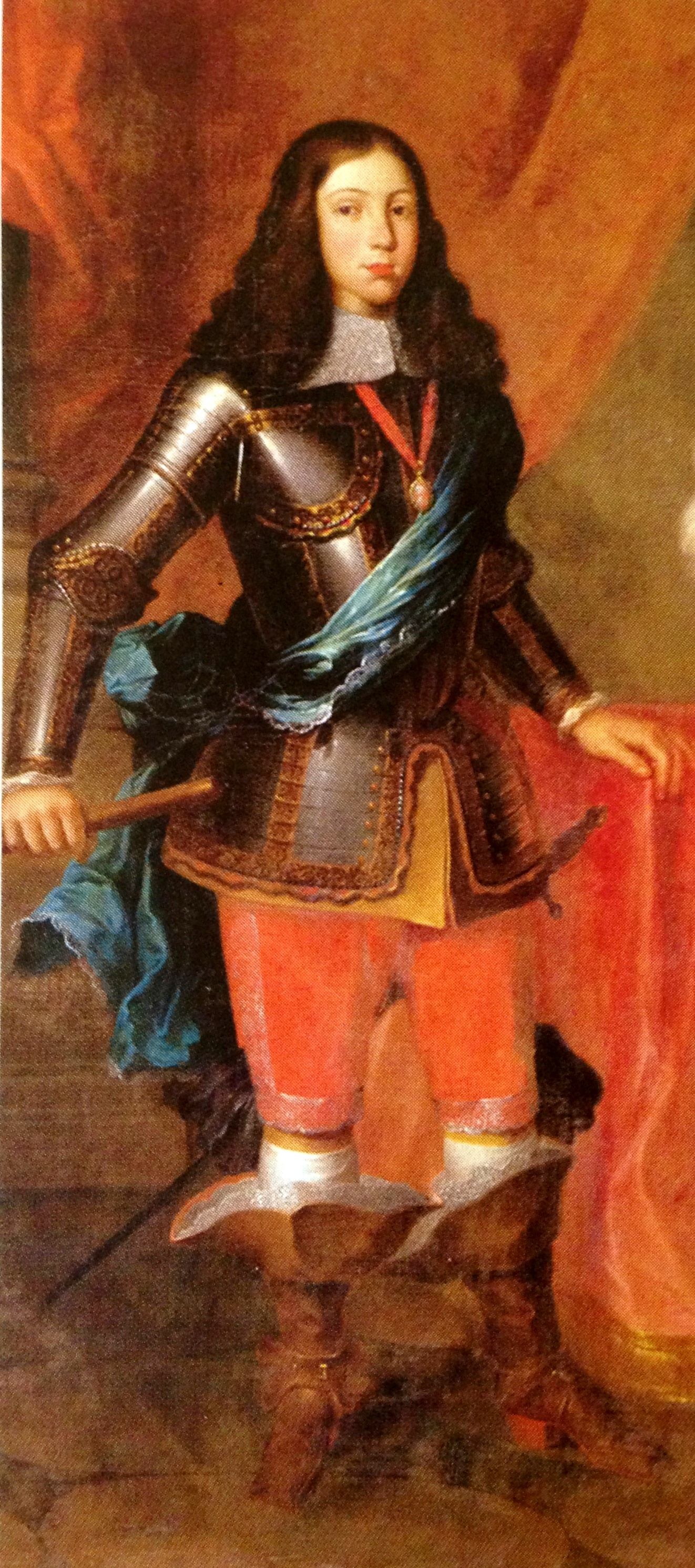
Afonso VI, second King of the House of Braganza.

John IV was a beloved monarch, a patron of fine art and music, and a proficient composer and writer on musical subjects. He collected one of the largest libraries in the world (Madeira & Aguiar, 2003). Among his writings is a defense of Palestrina and a Defense of Modern Music (Lisbon, 1649). Abroad, the Dutch took Portuguese Malacca (January 1641) and the Sultan of Oman captured Muscat (1648). By 1654, however, most of Brazil was back in Portuguese hands and had effectively ceased to be a viable Dutch colony. John married his daughter Catherine of Braganza to Charles II of England, offering Tangiers and Bombay as a dowry. John IV died in 1656 and was succeeded by his son Afonso VI.

Afonso VI became King of Portugal when he was thirteen years old. The young king suffered from an illness that paralyzed the left side of his body and left him mentally unstable. After a six-year regency of Luísa de Guzman, the Queen Mother, Afonso assumed the control of the country. His reign was short due to a conspiracy of his wife, Queen Marie Françoise of Savoy, who joined with Afonso's brother, Prince Peter, to secure an annulment of her marriage to the king in 1667 based on his impotence. Peter later married Marie Françoise. In the same year, Peter managed to gain enough support to force the king to relinquish control of the government and to name him Prince Regent.

Peter continued as Prince Regent but de facto ruler of Portugal for the next 16 years. When Afonso died in 1683, Peter succeeded him as Peter II of Portugal. Peter II is considered the first absolutist monarch of Portugal. He dismissed the historic legislative Portuguese Cortes in 1697 and ruled alone. He encouraged the focusing of Portuguese exploration of Brazil after silver was found in the territory. Peter's reign also saw the signing of the Methuen Treaty of trade with England.

Peter was succeeded by his son John V in 1706. An admirer of Louis XIV, John maintained a lavish court paid for by the riches of Brazil and ruled as an absolutist king, ignoring the Cortes (which had only convened sporadically since 1640) and personally appointing ministers. His cognomens were "the Magnanimous", "the Magnificent" or "the Portuguese Sun-King" and he is perhaps the best example of an absolutist monarch in Portugal. His long reign was characterized by a strengthening of the king's powers, made possible by the large revenues flowing to Portugal from Brazil.

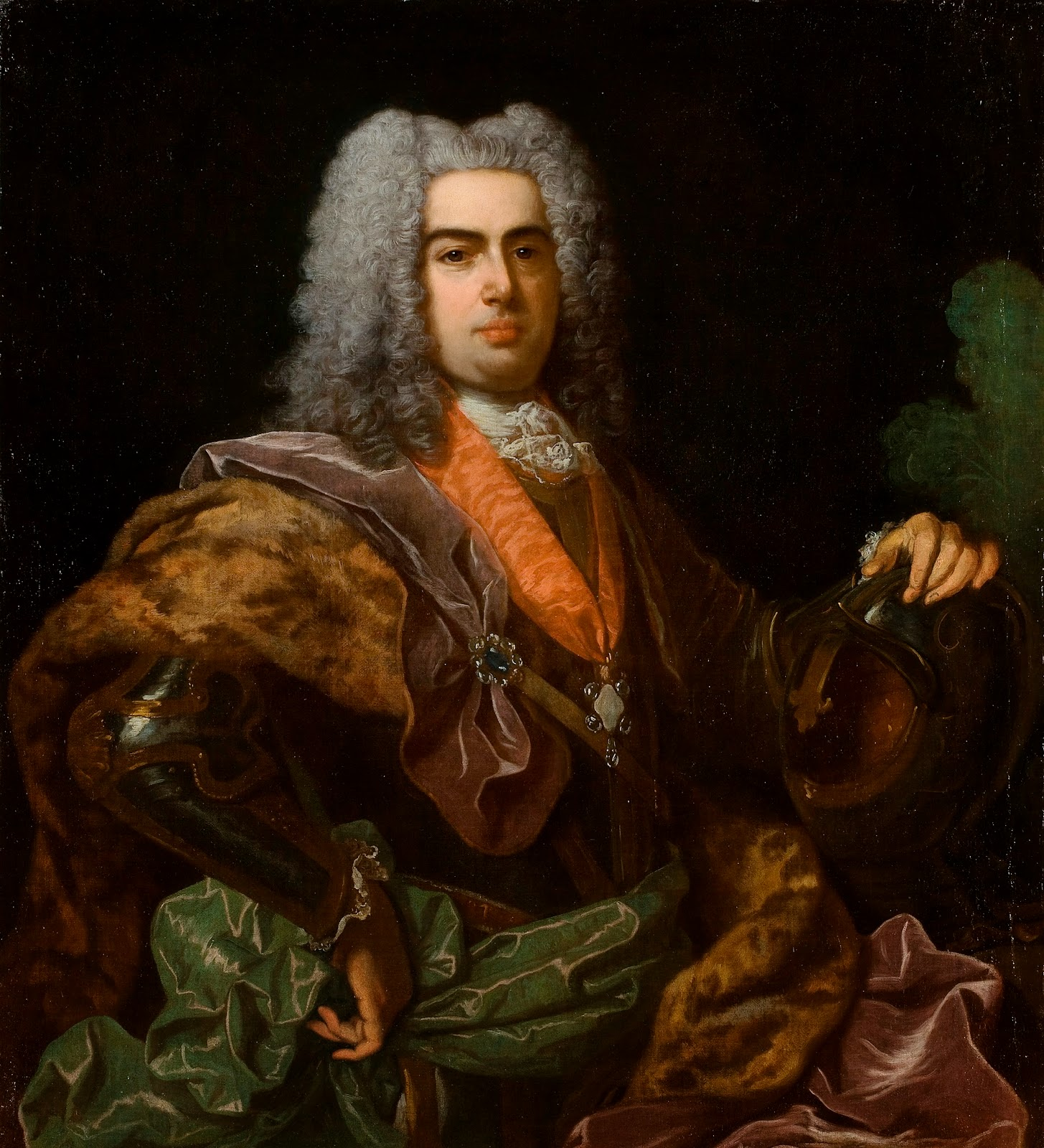
John V of Portugal.

John V used the crown's treasure to develop Portugal's weakened economy by creating new manufactures across the country; however, the majority of the investment was used to patronize the arts and intellectuals and regain Portugal's lost prestige among its European neighbors (Carmo Reis 1987). His foreign policy followed two simple rules: political neutrality in European conflicts, and attempts to increase his prestige in Rome. The title "Most Faithful Majesty" was eventually bestowed upon John V and his successors by a papal bull.

John V's last years of life were dedicated to devout acts and to subservience to the clergy (Madeira & Aguiar 2003). His early economic measures, which were unpopular among the upper nobility (Mattoso Vol. IV 1993), became ineffective and public affairs were so dependent on the monarch's rule that they became almost inoperative (Carmo Reis 1987). In his later years, Portugal lapsed into stagnation. John V died on July 31, 1750, and was succeeded by his son Joseph I.

== Empire in Brazil ==
A consequence of the personal union with Spain was the loss of the Portuguese monopoly of the Indian Ocean. English, French and Dutch conquered Portuguese possessions in Asia. Of the huge Empire of Manuel I and John III, the Portuguese were reduced to the stronghold of Goa, several small strongholds in India, Macau on the coast of China, and the island of Portuguese Timor. Trade posts in Africa were lost to the English (Gulf of Guinea) and Dutch (Natal and Portuguese Gold Coast). Faced with this situation, the Portuguese focused their commercial interests on Brazil, which was partially under Dutch control. After several years of open warfare, the Dutch formally withdrew in 1654 after an English mediation.

Sugar cultivation was introduced in Brazil at the beginning of the 17th century, and proved to be a great success. The colony's economy was based on plantation agriculture and powered by slave labor. In the late 17th century, colonial Brazilian explorers known as bandeirantes found gold in what is today the state of Minas Gerais (General Mines). The Portuguese colonists began an exploration of Brazil's interior beyond the line of the Treaty of Tordesillas (later according with Spain the Treaty of Madrid). Settlements in southeastern Brazil, nearer the gold regions, grew at a rapid pace, eventually eclipsing the older settlements of the northeastern coast.

The world's first great gold rush began with thousands of colonists and slaves pouring into the rugged mountains north of Rio de Janeiro. The rush eventually spread to many other regions of Brazil. In the 1720s, the rush suffered another stimulus with the discovery of diamonds and the two mining industries grew fast. By the 18th century, perhaps 80 percent of the gold in Europe originated in Brazil.

In Lisbon, gold from Brazil had an enormous impact on Portuguese society. The Royal Family had the right to collecting one-fifth of the gold mined in Brazil, growing rich and recovering the prestige of the previous centuries. The gold rush also caused emigration to Brazil and deprived Portugal of a large part of its population. The population was denuded to such an extent that John V prohibited emigration in 1709 (Mattoso Vol. IV 1993). It was also during this period that the Amerindians gained total freedom, a decision that contrasted with the growing slave trade.

The conditions for the Brazilian independence started to form. As the Portuguese elites received most of the profits from gold mining in Brazil, the plantations and mine owners started to protest the reassertion of imperial control and the constant imposition of new taxes. The first sign of Brazilian nationalism, the Minas Conspiracy, was felt during the rule of the Marquis of Pombal. A revolt led by prominent figures as well as military officers failed and Royal courts sentenced most of the conspirators to prison or exile. This situation was aggravated when the Napoleonic Wars started. During the reign of Maria I and regency of her son Prince John, the isolation of Spain's colonies in relation to mainland Spain led to a series of independence wars throughout Latin America, creating a tense situation between the colony and Lisbon. With the transfer of the Royal court to Rio de Janeiro in 1807, the tense situation was attenuated as Prince Regent John declared Brazil a Vice-Kingdom and Portugal's official name became the United Kingdom of Portugal, Brazil and the Algarves.

The Methuen Treaty was signed between Peter II of Portugal and Queen Anne of England in 1703. It was named for John Methuen, the British Ambassador Extraordinary to Portugal where he negotiated the treaty. The Methuen Treaty cemented allegiances in the War of the Spanish Succession and created favorable trading terms for both nations, especially regarding port wine. The commercial part of the treaty established that English textiles would be preferred in Portugal, and that Portuguese wines (mainly port) would be preferred in England by paying only two thirds of the rates settled with France. The Methuen Treaty played a major part in the development of the port wine industry as the decisions provided great stimulus to wine production in the hinterland of Porto.

Spanish and Portuguese empires in 1790.

In the alliance with England in the War of the Spanish Succession, the Portuguese gained the protection of both English and Dutch. Portugal suffered French attacks in Rio de Janeiro and Portuguese Cape Verde but managed to secure the colonies. In Europe, the Portuguese stood by the Grand Alliance and, led by the Portuguese General Marquis of Minas and English Count Galway, advanced into Spanish Castile, capturing Madrid on 28 June, but sustained defeat in the Battle of Almansa on April 14, 1707, against Spain and France led by the Duke of Berwick and the Duke of Popoli. The joint forces of the Portuguese and English suffered 5,000 casualties and 8,000 soldiers were made prisoners. An armistice was signed with France in 1713 and peace was made with Spain in 1715.

== Marquis of Pombal ==
When John V died in 1750, he was succeeded by his son Prince Joseph Emmanuel, who reigned as Joseph I. He loved the palatial life, opera, and was devoted to the Catholic Church (Mattoso Vol. IV 1993). He enjoyed the Royal Family's riches of the Brazilian gold and decided, instead of ruling, to delegate all his powers to Sebastião José de Carvalho e Melo (Portuguese pronunciation: [sɨβɐʃtiˈɐ̃w ʒuˈzɛ ðɨ kɐɾˈvaʎu i ˈmɛlu]), future Count of Oeiras and Marquis of Pombal

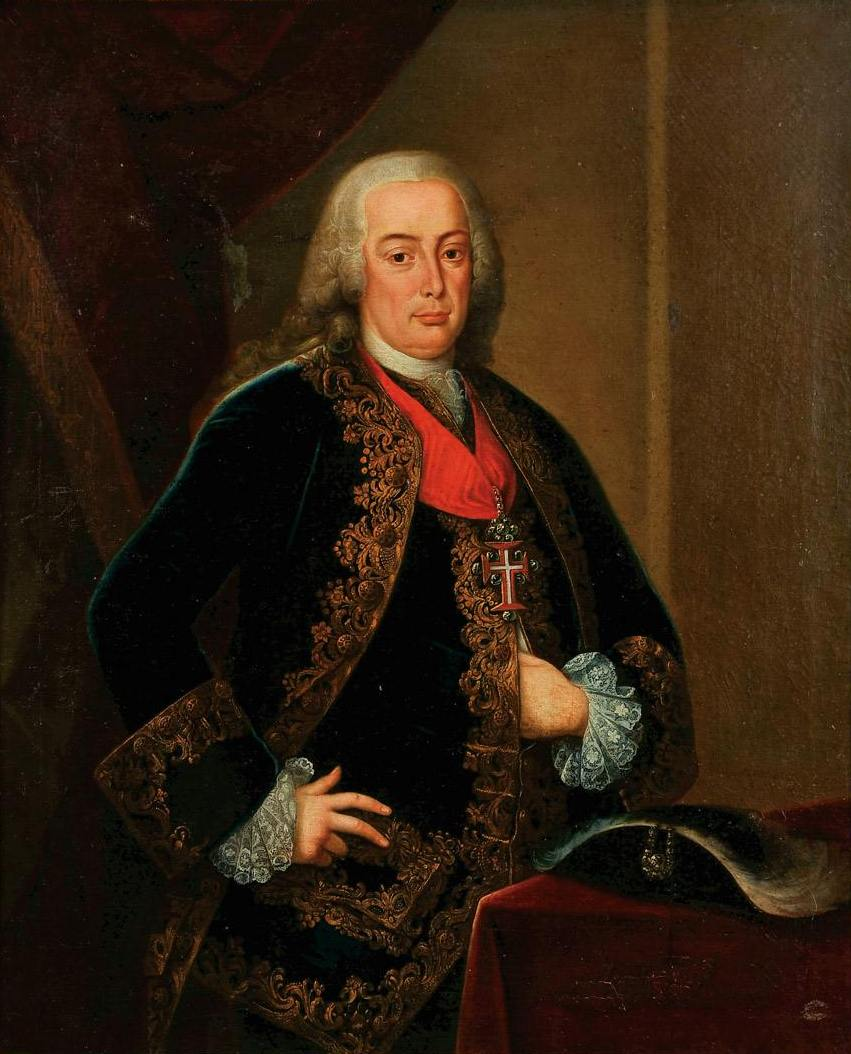
Sebastião José de Carvalho e Melo, Marquis of Pombal, Prime Minister of Portugal

Melo sought to replace Portugal's stagnant absolutism with an enlightened despotism and overhaul all aspects of economic, social and colonial policy to make Portugal a more efficient contender with the other great powers of Europe, and thus secure its own power status as a result. Impressed by the English economic success, which he had witnessed while serving as ambassador in London, he successfully implemented similar economic policies in Portugal. He was responsible for the abolition of slavery in continental Portugal and in Portuguese India in 1769, development of the port wine industry, and the end of discrimination against non-Catholic Christians in Portugal. He also reorganized the army and navy, bringing the total Portuguese military strength to around 90,000 troops. The reformed Portuguese army was put to the test in 1762 when Spain invaded aided by France, during the Seven Years' War. Britain invoked its alliance with Portugal and sent troops. Several months later, the conflict was settled with comparatively little fighting. In 1777, Spain and Portugal signed the Treaty of San Ildefonso, which mainly resolved a number of border disputes between their South American colonies.

During the Age of Enlightenment, Portugal was considered one of Europe's unenlightened backwaters; it was a country of three million with 200,000 people in 538 monasteries in 1750. Melo seems to have been deeply embarrassed by Portugal's much lamented backwardness. Having lived in two major centers of European enlightenment as his country's ambassador to both Vienna and London, he increasingly identified the Jesuits with their alleged doctrinaire grip on science and education as an inherent drag on an independent, Portuguese style illuminism. Especially in England, he came in contact with the anti-Jesuit tradition of that country and in Vienna he made friends with Gerhard van Swieten, a staunch adversary of the Austrian Jesuits and their influence. As prime minister Melo engaged the Jesuits in a dirty propaganda war, which was watched closely by the rest of Europe, and he launched some conspiracy theories about the order's desire for power.

The Marquis did not confront only the Jesuits. In the course of the Távora affair he accused both the Society of Jesus and a series of powerful noble families surrounding the Távora family of treason and attempted regicide. Melo was an important precursor for the suppression of the Jesuits throughout Europe and its colonies, which culminated in 1773, when Pope Clement XIV abolished the order.

Further reforms were carried out in education. He created the basis for secular public primary and secondary schools, introduced vocational training, created hundreds of new teaching posts, added departments of mathematics and natural sciences to the University of Coimbra, and introduced new taxes to pay for these reforms.

But Melo's greatest reforms were economic and financial, with the creation of several companies and guilds to regulate every commercial activity. He demarcated the region for production of port, the first attempt to control wine quality and production in Europe. He ruled with a strong hand by imposing strict laws upon all classes of Portuguese society from the nobility to the working class, and through his widespread review of the country's tax system. These reforms gained him enemies in the upper classes, especially among the high nobility, who despised him as a social upstart. The reform of the wine industry in 1757 provoked riots that were suppressed with considerable bloodshed. When the appatic King Joseph died on February 24, 1777, he was succeeded by the first Queen of Portugal, Maria I. The Queen disliked the Marquis and the Marquis was not fond of the new Queen (Madeira & Aguiar 2003), so she dismissed him from his post and prohibited him of leaving his Marquessate of Pombal.

== 1755 Lisbon earthquake ==
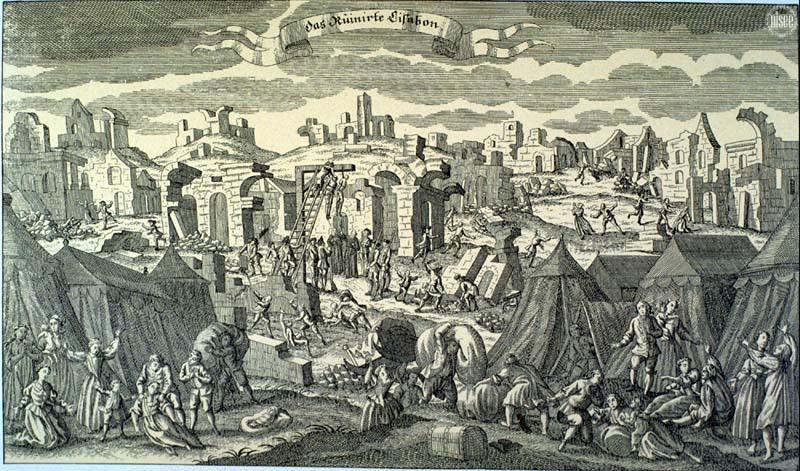
The Ruins of Lisbon. Survivors lived in tents on the outskirts of the city after the earthquake, as shown in this 1755 German engraving.

On November 1, 1755, at 9:20 am, a massive earthquake (estimated at 8.5–9.0 on the moment magnitude scale) struck Lisbon, followed by a tsunami and a fire, resulting in the near-total destruction of the city. The earthquake accentuated political tensions in Portugal and profoundly disrupted the country's 18th century colonial ambitions.

Of a Lisbon population of 275,000, up to 90,000 were killed and eighty-five percent of Lisbon's buildings were destroyed, including famous palaces and libraries, as well as most examples of Portugal's distinctive 16th century Manueline architecture.

Owing to a stroke of luck, the Royal Family escaped unharmed from the catastrophe. King Joseph I and the court had left the city, after attending mass at sunrise, fulfilling the wish of one of the King's daughters to spend the holiday away from Lisbon. After the catastrophe, Joseph developed a fear of living within walls, and the court was accommodated in a huge complex of tents and pavilions in the hills of Ajuda, then on the outskirts of Lisbon. The King's claustrophobia never waned, and it was only after Joseph's death that his daughter Maria I began building the royal Ajuda Palace, which still stands on the site of the old tented camp.

Like the king, Prime Minister Sebastião de Melo survived the earthquake and is reported to have said, "Now? Bury the dead and feed the living." With the pragmatism that characterized his coming rule, the Prime Minister immediately began organizing recovery and reconstruction. He sent firefighters into the city to extinguish the flames and ordered teams to remove the thousands of corpses. Contrary to custom and against the wishes of representatives of the Church, many corpses were loaded onto barges and buried at sea beyond the mouth of the River Tagus to prevent disease. To halt disorder, especially looting, in the ruined city, gallows were constructed at high points around the city and at least 34 people were executed. The Portuguese Army was mobilized to surround the city to prevent the able-bodied from fleeing, so that they could be pressed into clearing the ruins.

Not long after the initial crisis, the prime minister and the king quickly hired architects and engineers, and less than a year later, Lisbon was already free from debris and undergoing reconstruction. The king was keen to have a new, perfectly ordained city. Big squares and wide rectilinear avenues were the signatures of the new Lisbon. At the time, somebody asked the Marquis of Pombal the need of such wide streets. The Marquis answered: one day they will be small. The chaotic traffic of modern Lisbon reflects the prescience of the reply.

Pombaline buildings were among the first seismically-protected constructions in the world. Small wooden models were built for testing, and earthquakes were simulated by marching troops around them. Lisbon's "new" downtown, known as the Pombaline Downtown (Baixa Pombalina), is one of the city's famed attractions. Sections of other Portuguese cities, like the Vila Real de Santo António in Algarve, were also rebuilt along Pombaline principles.

== Expulsion of the Jesuits ==
The expulsion of the Jesuits from Portugal has been seen as a quarrel with Prime Minister Sebastião de Melo, Marquis of Pombal. Melo's quarrel with the Jesuits began over an exchange of South American colonial territory with Spain. By a secret treaty of 1750, Portugal relinquished to Spain the contested colony of Colónia do Sacramento at the mouth of the Uruguay River in exchange for the Seven Reductions of Paraguay, the autonomous Jesuit missions that had been nominal Spanish colonial territory. The Jesuits, disagreeing with transfers of Guaraní populations from one territory to another, caused the Guaraní War and Portugal, fearing an attempt to build an independent empire in the New World, forbade the Jesuits to continue the local administration of their former missions. Portuguese Jesuits were removed from the court.

On April 1, 1758, a brief was obtained from the aged Pope Benedict XIV, appointing the Portuguese Cardinal Saldanha, recommended by Pombal, to investigate allegations against the Jesuits that had been raised in the King of Portugal's name. Benedict was skeptical as to the gravity of the alleged abuses. He ordered a minute inquiry, but to safeguard the Society's reputation, all serious matters were to be referred back to him. Benedict died the following month, however, on May 3. On May 15, Saldanha, having received the papal brief only a fortnight before, omitting the thorough visitation of Jesuit houses that had been ordered, and pronouncing on the issues the pope had reserved to himself, declared that the Jesuits were guilty of exercising illicit, public, and scandalous commerce, both in Portugal and in its colonies. Pombal moved quickly during the papal sede vacante. In three weeks, the Jesuits were stripped of all Portuguese possessions, and before Cardinal Rezzonico had been made pope as Clement XIII on July 6, 1758, the Portuguese dispossession of the Society was a fait accompli.

The last straw for the Court of Portugal was the attempted assassination of the king on September 3, 1758, of which the Jesuits were alleged to have had prior knowledge (see the Távora affair below). Among those arrested and executed was Gabriel Malagrida, the Jesuit confessor of Leonor of Távora. The Jesuits were expelled from the kingdom; important non-Portuguese members of the Order were imprisoned. The Order was civilly suppressed in 1759. The Portuguese ambassador was recalled from Rome and the papal nuncio sent home in disgrace. Relations between Portugal and Rome were broken off until 1770.

== Távora affair ==
The Távora affair was a political scandal of the 18th-century Portuguese court. The events triggered by the attempted murder of King Joseph I in 1758 ended with the public execution of the entire Távora family and its closest relatives in 1759. Some historians interpret the whole affair as an attempt by the Prime Minister Melo (future Marquis of Pombal) to limit the growing powers of the families of the high nobility.

Clashes between Melo and nobility were common because the nobility despised him for his quick ascension to power. The clashes were tolerated by the king who trusted his prime minister's judgment.

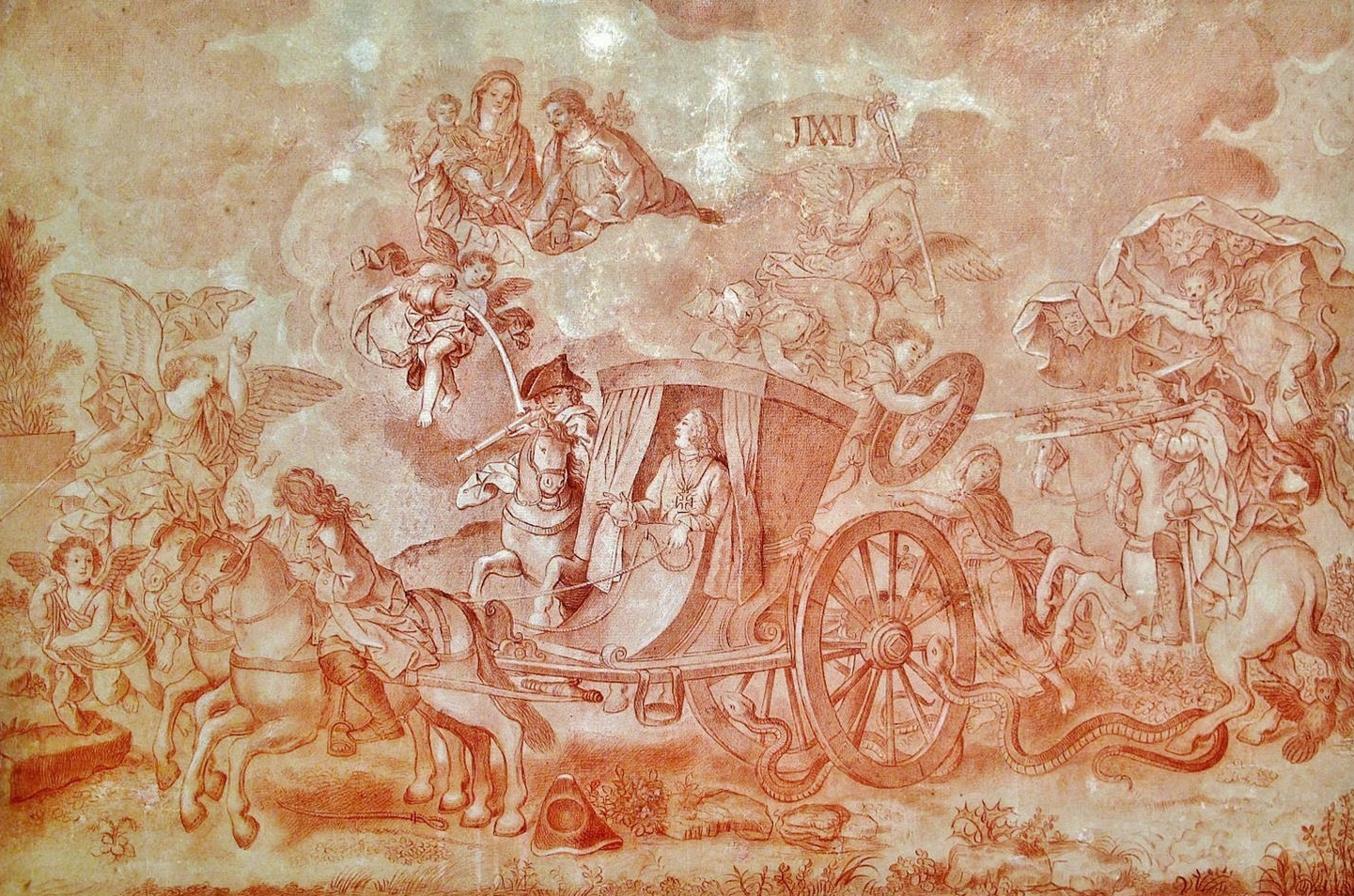
Attempted regicide of Joseph I of Portugal

On the night of September 3, 1758, Joseph I was riding an unmarked carriage in a secondary and unfrequented road in the outskirts of Lisbon. The king was returning from an evening with his mistress to the tents of Ajuda. Somewhere along the way two to three men intercepted the carriage and fired on its occupants. Joseph I was shot in an arm and his driver was badly wounded, but both survived and returned to Ajuda.

Immediately Melo took control of the situation. Concealing the attack and the king's injuries, he proceeded with a swift enquiry. A few days afterwards, two men were arrested for the shootings and tortured. The men confessed their guilt and stated that were following orders of the Távora family, which was plotting to put the Duke of Aveiro in the throne. Both were hanged the following day, even before the attempted regicide was made public.

In the following weeks the Marchioness Leonor of Távora, her husband, the Count of Alvor, as well as all of their sons, daughters and grandchildren were imprisoned. The conspirators, the Duke of Aveiro and the Távoras' sons-in-law, the Marquis of Alorna and the Count of Atouguia, were arrested with their families. Gabriel Malagrida, the Jesuit confessor of Leonor of Távora was also arrested.

They were all accused of high treason and attempted murder of the king. The evidence presented in their common trial was very simple: (a) the confessions of the executed killers; (b) the murder weapon that belonged to the Duke of Aveiro and (c) the assumption that only the Távoras would have known the whereabouts of the king in that evening, since he was returning from a liaison with Teresa of Távora, who was also arrested.

The Távoras denied all charges but were eventually sentenced to death. Their estates were confiscated by the crown, their name erased from the peerage and their coat-of-arms outlawed. The original sentence ordered the execution of all of them, including women and children. Only the intervention of Queen Mariana and Princess Maria Francisca, the heiress to the throne, saved most of them.

The Marchioness, however, was not spared. She and her other defendants who had been sentenced to death were publicly tortured and executed on January 13, 1759, in a field near Lisbon. The king was present along with his bewildered court. The Távoras were their peers and kin, but the prime minister wanted the lesson to be learned. Afterwards, the ground was salted to prevent future growth of vegetation. Nowadays, this field is a square of Lisbon, called Terreiro Salgado, the salty ground.

Gabriel Malagrida was burned at the stake a few days afterwards and the Jesuit Order declared outlaws. All its estates were confiscated and all the Jesuits expelled from Portuguese territory, both in Europe and the colonies. The Alorna family and the daughters of the Duke of Aveiro were sentenced to life imprisonment in monasteries and convents.

Sebastião de Melo was made Count of Oeiras for his competent handling of the affair, and later, in 1770, was promoted to Marquis of Pombal, the name he is known by today.

== The Ghost War ==
In 1762, France and Spain tried to urge Portugal to join the Bourbon Family Compact by claiming that Great Britain had become too powerful due to its successes in the Seven Years' War. Joseph refused to accept and protested that his 1704 alliance with Britain was no threat.

In spring 1762, Spanish and French troops invaded Portugal from the north as far as the Douro, while a second column sponsored the Siege of Almeida, captured the city, and threatened to advance on Lisbon. The arrival of a force of British troops helped the Portuguese army commanded by the Count of Lippe by blocking the Franco-Spanish advance and driving them back across the border following the Battle of Valencia de Alcántara. At the Treaty of Paris in 1763, Spain agreed to hand Almeida back to Portugal.

== See also ==
- List of Portuguese monarchs
- Timeline of Portuguese history
- Portuguese Renaissance
