= Távora (surname) =

Távora is a surname. Notable people with the surname include:

- Fernando Távora (1920-2005), Portuguese architect
- Francisco de Távora (1646–1710), Portuguese nobleman
- Franklin Távora (1842-1888), Brazilian novelist
- Luis Bernardo de Tavora (1723-1759), Portuguese nobleman
- Leonor Tomásia de Távora, 3rd Marquise of Távora (1700-1759), Portuguese noblewoman
- Sahil Tavora (born 1995), Indian footballer
