= Treaty of Paris (1763) =

Treaty ending the Seven Years' War

The definitive Treaty of Peace and Friendship between his Britannick Majesty, the Most Christian King [of France], and the King of Spain. Concluded at Paris the 10th day of February, 1763. To which the King of Portugal acceded on the same day.
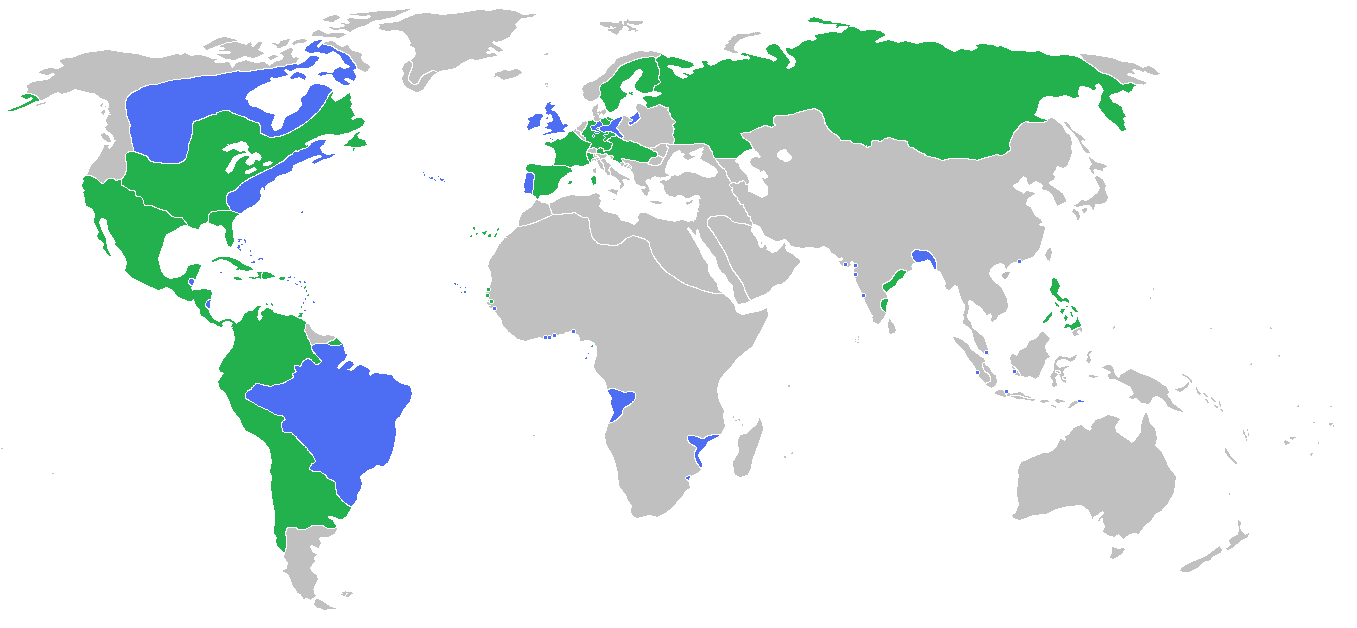
- The combatants of the Seven Years' War as shown before the outbreak of war in the mid-1750s. Great Britain, Prussia, Portugal, with allies France, Spain, Austria, Russia, with allies
- Context: End of the Seven Years' War (known as the French and Indian War in the United States)
- Signed: 10 February 1763
- Location: Paris, France
- Negotiators: (Kingdom of Great Britain) John Russell, 4th Duke of Bedford; (Kingdom of France) César Gabriel de Choiseul, Duke of Praslin; (Spain) Jerónimo Grimaldi, 1st Duke of Grimaldi
- Signatories: Great Britain; (Kingdom of France) France; Spain; Portugal
- Parties: Great Britain; France; Spain; Portugal

Full text
- Treaty of Paris (1763) at Wikisource
- See also: Treaty of Hubertusburg (1763) and Treaty of Paris (1783)

The Treaty of Paris, also known as the Treaty of 1763, was signed on 10 February 1763 by the kingdoms of Great Britain, France and Spain, with Portugal in agreement, following Great Britain and Prussia's victory over France and Spain during the Seven Years' War.

The signing of the treaty formally ended the conflict between France and Great Britain over control of North America (the Seven Years' War, known as the French and Indian War in the United States), and marked the beginning of an era of British dominance outside Europe. Great Britain and France each returned much of the territory that they had captured during the war, but Great Britain gained much of France's possessions in North America. Additionally, Great Britain agreed not to seek to eradicate Roman Catholicism in the New World. The treaty did not involve Prussia and Austria, as they signed a separate agreement, the Treaty of Hubertusburg, five days later.

== Exchange of territories ==
During the war, Great Britain had conquered the French colonies of Canada, Guadeloupe, Saint Lucia, Martinique, Dominica, Grenada, Saint Vincent and the Grenadines, and Tobago, the French factories (trading posts) in India including Chandernagore and Pondicherry, the slave-trading station at Gorée, the Sénégal River and its settlements, and the Spanish colonies of Manila (in the Philippines) and Havana (in Cuba). France had captured Minorca and British trading posts in Sumatra, while Spain had captured the border fortress of Almeida in Portugal, and Colonia del Sacramento in South America.

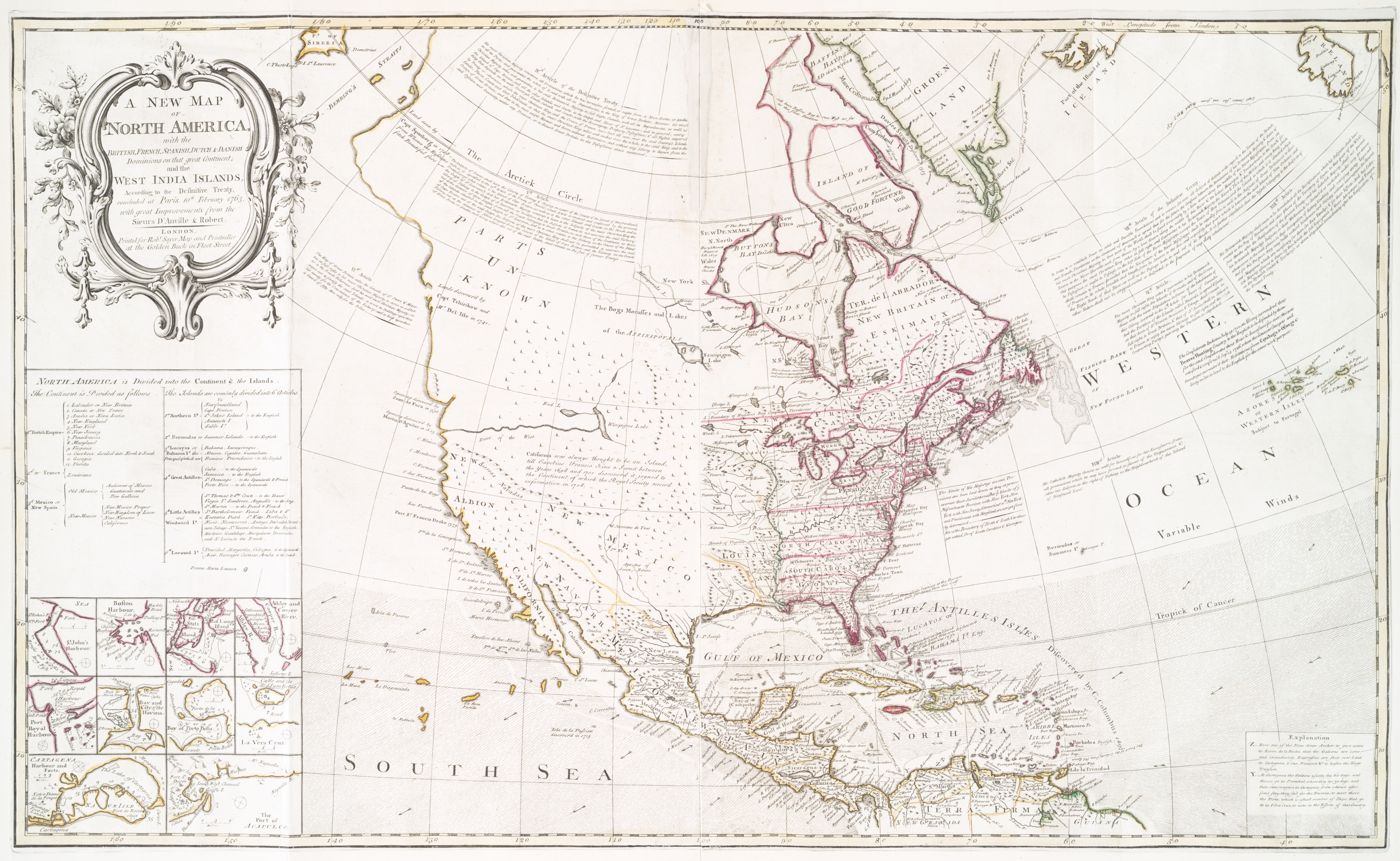
"A new map of North America" – produced following the Treaty of Paris

The treaty restored most of the territories to their original owners, but Britain was allowed to keep considerable gains. France and Spain restored all their conquests to Britain and Portugal. Britain restored Manila and Havana to Spain, and Guadeloupe, Martinique, Saint Lucia, Gorée, and the Indian factories to France. In return, France recognized the sovereignty of Britain over Canada, Dominica, Grenada, Saint Vincent and the Grenadines, and Tobago.

France also ceded the eastern half of French Louisiana to Britain; that is, the area from the Mississippi River to the Appalachian Mountains. France had already secretly given Louisiana to Spain three months earlier in the Treaty of Fontainebleau, but Spain did not take possession until 1769. Spain ceded Florida to Britain. In addition, France regained its factories in India but recognized British clients as the rulers of key Indian native states and pledged not to send troops to Bengal. Britain agreed to demolish its fortifications in British Honduras (now Belize) but retained a logwood-cutting colony there. Britain confirmed the right of its new subjects to practise Catholicism.

France lost all its territory in mainland North America except for the territory of Louisiana west of the Mississippi River. France retained fishing rights off Newfoundland and reacquired from Britain the two small islands of Saint Pierre and Miquelon, where the fishermen could dry their catch. In turn, France gained the return of its sugar colony, Guadeloupe, which it considered more valuable than Canada. Voltaire had notoriously dismissed Acadia as quelques arpents de neige (a few acres of snow).

== Louisiana question ==
The Treaty of Paris is notable because it furthered the transfer of Louisiana from France to Spain. However, the agreement to transfer had occurred with the Treaty of Fontainebleau, but it was not publicly announced until 1764. The Treaty of Paris gave Britain the east side of the Mississippi (including Baton Rouge, Louisiana, which was to be part of the British territory of West Florida). On the east side, New Orleans remained in French hands (albeit temporarily). The Mississippi River corridor in what is now Louisiana was later reunited following the Louisiana Purchase in 1803 and the Adams–Onís Treaty in 1819.

The 1763 treaty states in Article VII:

VII. In order to reestablish peace on solid and durable foundations, and to remove for ever all subject of dispute with regard to the limits of the British and French territories on the continent of America; it is agreed, that, for the future, the confines between the dominions of his Britannick Majesty and those of his Most Christian Majesty, in that part of the world, shall be fixed irrevocably by a line drawn along the middle of the River Mississippi, from its source to the river Iberville, and from thence, by a line drawn along the middle of this river, and the lakes Maurepas and Pontchartrain to the sea; and for this purpose, the Most Christian King cedes in full right, and guaranties to his Britannick Majesty the river and port of the Mobile, and every thing which he possesses, or ought to possess, on the left side of the river Mississippi, except the town of New Orleans and the island in which it is situated, which shall remain to France, provided that the navigation of the river Mississippi shall be equally free, as well to the subjects of Great Britain as to those of France, in its whole breadth and length, from its source to the sea, and expressly that part which is between the said island of New Orleans and the right bank of that river, as well as the passage both in and out of its mouth: It is farther stipulated, that the vessels belonging to the subjects of either nation shall not be stopped, visited, or subjected to the payment of any duty whatsoever. The stipulations inserted in the IVth article, in favour of the inhabitants of Canada shall also take place with regard to the inhabitants of the countries ceded by this article.

"Most Christian Magesty" and "Most Christian King" are styles of the French sovereign.

== Canada question ==
=== British perspective ===
The war was fought all over the world, but the British began the war over French possessions in North America. After a long debate of the relative merits of Guadeloupe, which produced £6 million a year in sugar, and Canada, which was expensive to keep, Great Britain decided to keep Canada for strategic reasons and to return Guadeloupe to France. The war had weakened France, but it was still a European power. British prime minister Lord Bute wanted a peace that would not push France towards a second war.

Although the Protestant British worried about having so many Roman Catholic subjects, Great Britain did not want to antagonize France by expulsion or forced conversion or for French settlers to leave Canada to strengthen other French settlements in North America.

=== French perspective ===
Unlike Lord Bute, the French Foreign Minister, the Duke of Choiseul, expected a return to war. However, France needed peace to rebuild. France preferred to keep its Caribbean possessions with their profitable sugar trade, rather than the vast Canadian lands, which had been a financial burden on France. French diplomats believed that without France to keep the Americans in check, the colonists might attempt to revolt. In Canada, France wanted open emigration for those, such as the nobility, who would not swear allegiance to the British Crown. Finally, France required toleration for Roman Catholics in North America.

Article IV stated:

IV. His Most Christian Majesty [King of France] renounces all pretensions which he has heretofore formed or might have formed to Nova Scotia or Acadia in all its parts, and guaranties the whole of it, and with all its dependencies, to the King of Great Britain: Moreover, his Most Christian Majesty cedes and guaranties to his said Britannick Majesty, in full right, Canada, with all its dependencies, as well as the island of Cape Breton, and all the other islands and coasts in the gulph and river of St. Lawrence, and in general, every thing that depends on the said countries, lands, islands, and coasts, with the sovereignty, property, possession, and all rights acquired by treaty, or otherwise, which the Most Christian King and the Crown of France have had till now over the said countries, lands, islands, places, coasts, and their inhabitants, so that the Most Christian King cedes and makes over the whole to the said King, and to the Crown of Great Britain, and that in the most ample manner and form, without restriction, and without any liberty to depart from the said cession and guaranty under any pretence, or to disturb Great Britain in the possessions above mentioned. His Britannick Majesty, on his side, agrees to grant the liberty of the Catholick religion to the inhabitants of Canada: he will, in consequence, give the most precise and most effectual orders, that his new Roman Catholic subjects may profess the worship of their religion according to the rites of the Romish church, as far as the laws of Great Britain permit. His Britannick Majesty farther agrees, that the French inhabitants, or others who had been subjects of the Most Christian King in Canada, may retire with all safety and freedom wherever they shall think proper, and may sell their estates, provided it be to the subjects of his Britannick Majesty, and bring away their effects as well as their persons, without being restrained in their emigration, under any pretence whatsoever, except that of debts or of criminal prosecutions: The term limited for this emigration shall be fixed to the space of eighteen months, to be computed from the day of the exchange of the ratification of the present treaty.

== Dunkirk question ==
During the negotiations that led to the treaty, a major issue of dispute between Britain and France had been over the status of the fortifications of the French coastal settlement of Dunkirk. The British had long feared that it would be used as a staging post to launch a French invasion of Britain. Under the 1713 Treaty of Utrecht, the British forced France to concede extreme limits on those fortifications. The 1748 Treaty of Aix-la-Chapelle had allowed more generous terms, and France constructed more significant defences for the town.

The 1763 treaty had Britain force France to accept the 1713 conditions and demolish the fortifications constructed since then. That would be a continuing source of resentment to France, which would eventually have that provision overturned in the 1783 Treaty of Paris, which brought an end to the American Revolutionary War.

== Reactions ==
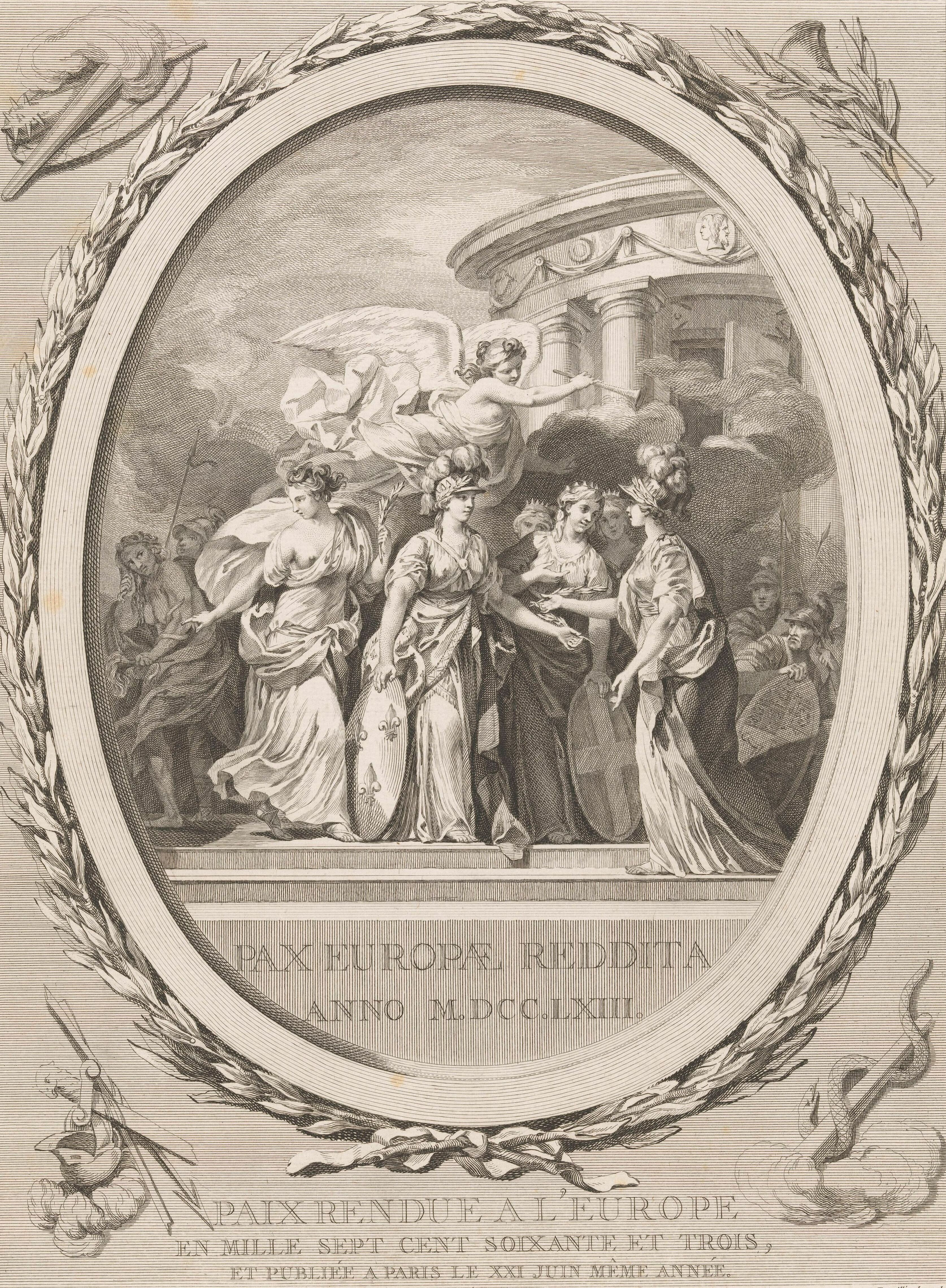
Allegory of the Peace of Paris, entitled Paix rendue à l'Europe. On the right, the figure of Peace hands olive branches to personifications of the party countries

When Lord Bute rose to the position of British prime minister in 1762, he pushed for a resolution to the war with France and Spain since he feared that Great Britain could not govern all of its newly acquired territories. In what Winston Churchill would later term a policy of "appeasement", Bute returned some colonies to Spain and France in the negotiations.

Despite a desire for peace, many in the British Parliament opposed the return of any gains made during the war. Notable among the opposition was former prime minister William Pitt the Elder, who warned that the terms of the treaty would lead to further conflicts once France and Spain had time to rebuild and later said, "The peace was insecure because it restored the enemy to her former greatness. The peace was inadequate, because the places gained were no equivalent for the places surrendered." The treaty passed by 319 votes to 65.

Across the Thirteen Colonies, Protestant colonists were disappointed by the toleration granted to Catholicism in the Treaty of Paris. American colonists who had moved to Quebec were additionally displeased with the fact that French law was preserved in the lower courts there and that Catholics in Canada would be allowed to serve as jurymen. It has been suggested that this disappointment, as well as the 1763 ban on settlement in the newly acquired Indian territories beyond the Appalachian Mountains, might have contributed to the outbreak of the American Revolution.

== Effects on French Canada ==
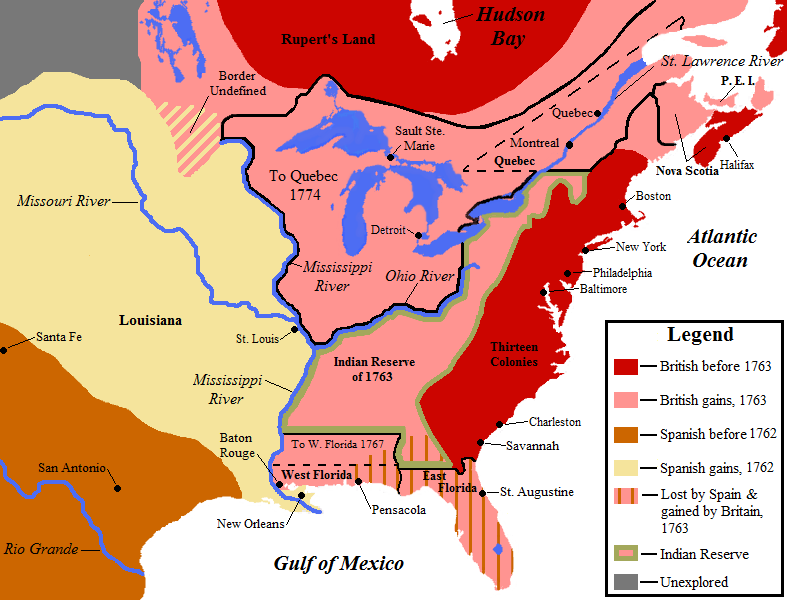
Map showing British territorial gains following the Treaty of Paris in pink and Spanish territorial gains after the consummation of the Treaty of Fontainebleau in yellow

The treaty permitted unrestrained French Canadian emigration from Canada for 18 months, though the comparatively high cost of travelling to Europe (among other factors) dissuaded most French Canadians. 1,600 people emigrated from New France in the 18 months following the treaty's signing, only 270 of which were French Canadians. Article IV of the treaty permitted Catholicism to be practised in Canada; at the time of the treaty's signing, the Test Acts 1673 & 1678 prevented British Catholics from serving in the bureaucracy, military and judiciary. The application of Test Acts were relaxed in Quebec, with more freedom granted to Catholics in the colony, though top positions such as governorships were still held by Anglicans.

Article IV has also been cited as the basis for Quebec's unique legal code that differs from the rest of Canada. There was a general constitutional principle in Britain which allowed colonies acquired through conquest from other European powers to maintain pre-conquest laws. This was limited by royal prerogative, which allowed the British monarch to change the existing legislation in colonies. However, the Treaty of Paris eliminated that power due to a different British constitutional principle, which considered the terms of a treaty to be paramount. In post-conquest Quebec, Catholics were allowed to serve as jurors in inferior courts and argue cases based on the principles of French law. However, if the case was appealed to a superior court, neither French law nor Catholic jurors were allowed.

The Acadians, French settlers living in the colony of Acadia and other parts of The Maritimes, were deported from the region by British authorities during the Seven Years' War. Following the signing of the treaty, which granted certain rights to Catholics, a number of Acadians returned to Canada. As they were no longer welcome in Nova Scotia, the returning Acadians settled in New Brunswick, which became a bilingual colony. The reaction of most French Canadians to the treaty was a sense of betrayal, perceiving France to have abandoned them. The Commander-in-Chief, North America, Jeffrey Amherst, noted that "Many of the Canadians consider their Colony to be of utmost consequence to France & cannot be convinced ... that their Country has been conceded to Great Britain."

== See also ==
- Evacuation of Spanish Florida (1763)
- France in the Seven Years' War
- Great Britain in the Seven Years' War
- Royal Proclamation of 1763
- List of treaties
- History of the French Navy from 1715 to 1789

== Sources ==
- Gough, Barry M. (1992). British Mercantile Interests in the Making of the Peace of Paris, 1763. Edwin Meller Press.
- Monod, Paul Kleber (2009). Imperial Island: A History of Britain and Its Empire, 1660–1837. Wiley-Blackwell.
