= Francisco de Távora, 1st Count of Alvor =

Portuguese noble (1646–1710)

Francisco de Távora
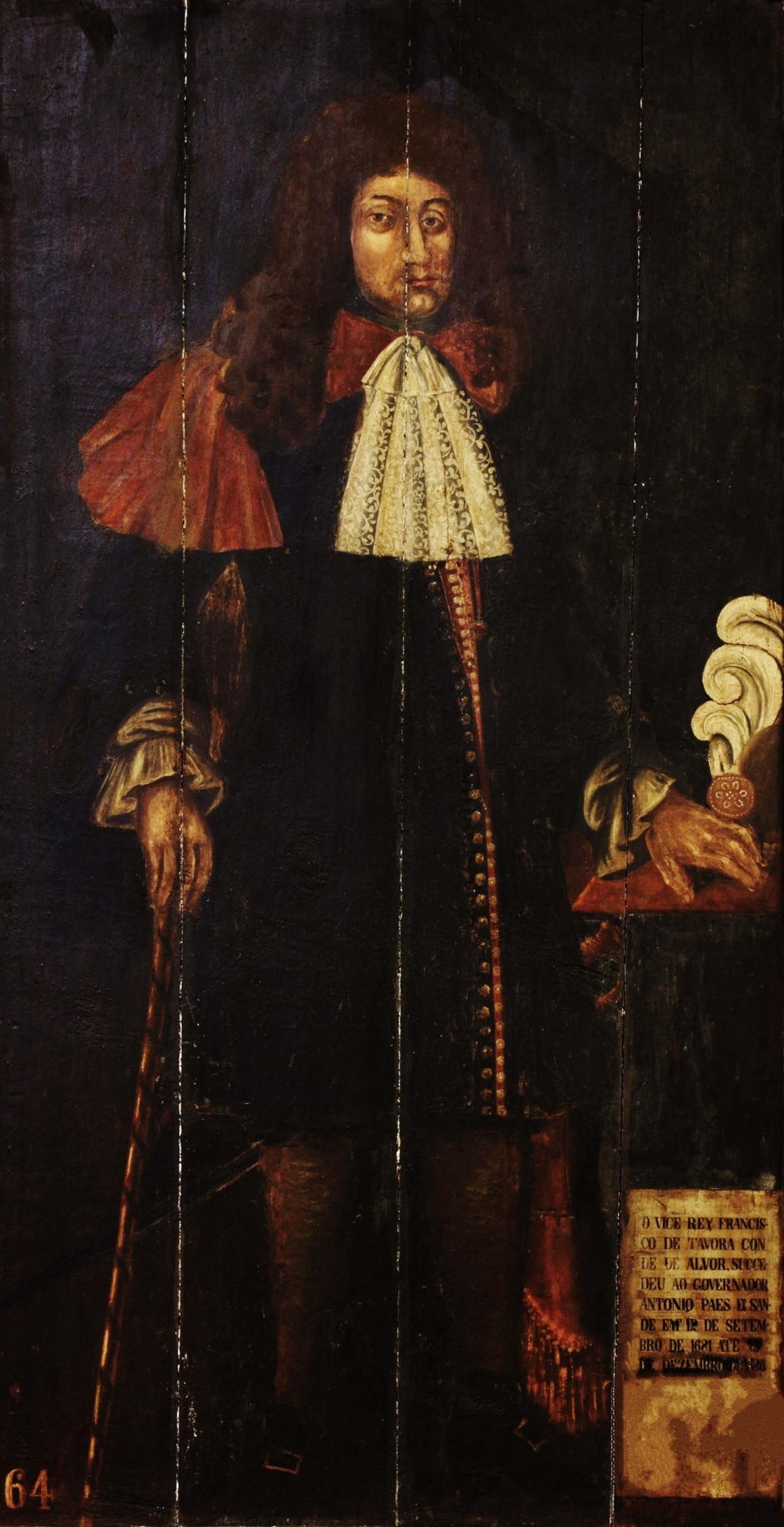

Governor of Portuguese Angola
- In office 1669–1676
- Monarchs: Afonso VI of Portugal; Pedro II of Portugal
- Preceded by: Governative Junta
- Succeeded by: Pires de Saldanha de Sousa e Meneses

Governor and Viceroy of Portuguese India
- In office 1681–1686
- Monarchs: Afonso VI of Portugal; Pedro II of Portugal
- Preceded by: António Brandão
- Succeeded by: Rodrigo da Costa

Personal details
- Born: 1646 Lisbon, Kingdom of Portugal
- Died: 31 May 1710 (aged 63–64) Moura, Kingdom of Portugal
- Spouse(s): Inês Catarina de Távora; Isabel da Silva
- Children: Maria Inácia de Távora; Bernardo António Filipe Neri de Távora; António Luis de Távora

Military service
- Allegiance: Kingdom of Portugal
- Battles/wars: Portuguese Restoration War; Maratha–Portuguese War (1683–1684); War of the Spanish Succession

D. Francisco de Távora, 1st Count of Alvor (1646 – 31 May 1710) was a Portuguese nobleman, military officer, diplomat, and colonial administrator of the second half of the 17th century and early 18th century.

== Biography ==
He served the Kingdom of Portugal during the reigns of Kings Afonso VI, Peter II, and John V.
He was Governor of Portuguese Angola (1669–1676) and 56th Governor / 33rd Viceroy of Portuguese India (1681–1686).

== Family ==
He was the third son of the 2nd Count of São João da Pesqueira, António Luís de Távora and his wife Arcângela Maria de Portugal, daughter of the 4th Count of Linhares.

He married Inês Catarina de Távora (died 1694) and had three children:

- Maria Inácia de Távora (1678)
- Bernardo António Filipe Neri de Távora, second Count of Alvor (1681)
  - father of Francisco de Assis de Távora (1703–1759)
- António Luís de Távora (1689).

His second marriage was with D. Isabel da Silva.
There were no children from this marriage.
