= A-dos-Ruivos =

Village in Oeste e Vale do Tejo, Portugal

Coordinates: 39°17′50″N 09°07′01″W

A-dos-Ruivos is a village located in near Carvalhal, at Bombarral, Portugal. It has a population of 196 inhabitants.

This Portuguese village was portrayed by the writer Júlio César Machado in his book "Serões na Aldeia". He owned a house there. The village has a bust of the writer on display in front of the village's church.

The Távora family took refuge there, in the 18th century, when they were being persecuted by the Marquess of Pombal.
