= Count of Alvor =

Noble title in the Kingdom of Portugal

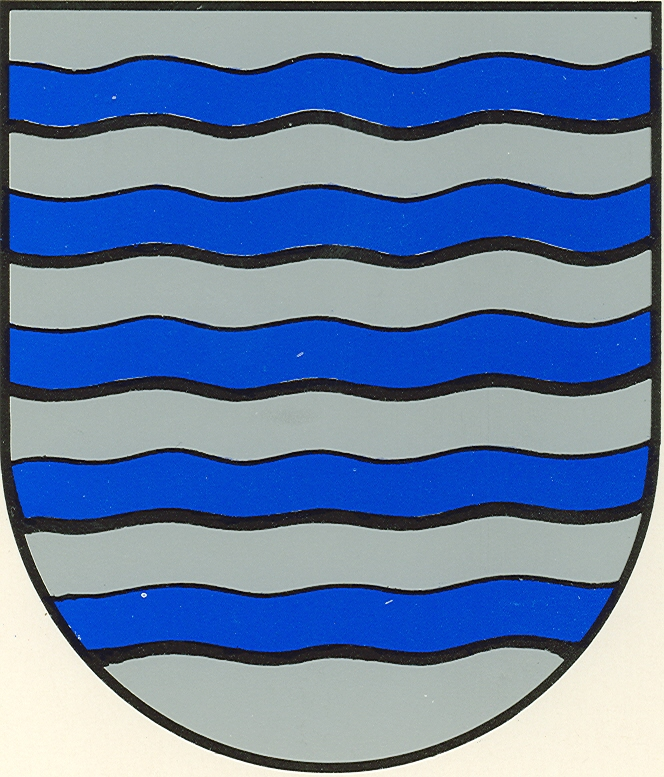
Coat of Arms of the Távora family, Counts of Alvor.

Count of Alvor (in Portuguese Conde de Alvor) was a Portuguese title of nobility granted by king Peter II of Portugal on 4 February 1683, to Francisco de Távora, second son of António Luís de Távora, 2nd Count of São João da Pesqueira.

With the Távora affair and the 3rd Count's execution in 1759, this title became extinct and it was granted again, in the 19th century, to Pedro Maria da Piedade de Lencastre e Távora, second son of the 8th Marquis of Abrantes, who descended from the Távoras.

== List of counts of Alvor ==
1. Francisco de Távora (1646–1710);
2. Bernardo António Filipe Neri de Távora (1681–1744), his son;
3. Francisco de Assis de Távora (1703–1759), his son, married to his cousin Leonor de Távora, 3rd Marchioness of Távora;
4. Pedro Maria da Piedade de Lancastre e Távora (1889- ? ), second son of the 8th Marquis of Abrantes.

== See also ==
- Távora affair
- List of countships in Portugal
- Marquis of Távora

== Bibliography ==
”Nobreza de Portugal e do Brasil" – Vol. II, pages 271/273. Published by Zairol Lda., Lisbon 1989.
