= O Delfim =

O Delfim is a Portuguese film directed by Fernando Lopes. It was based on the book with the same name by José Cardoso Pires. It was the Portuguese submission for the Academy Award for Best Foreign Language Film in 2002.

== Cast ==
- Rogério Samora — Palma Bravo
- Alexandra Lencastre — Maria das Mercês
- Ruy Morrison — Caçador / narrador
- Isabel Ruth — Aninhas
- Milton Lopes — Domingos
- Miguel Guilherme — padre novo
- Rita Loureiro — mulher jovem
- José Pinto — cauteleiro
- Márcia Breia — dona da pensão
- Alexandre de Sousa — Regedor
- Laura Soveral — camponesa
- Fernando Jorge — batedor
- Sofia Bénard da Costa — criada da pensão
- Joaquim Leitão — ex-combatante
- Paula Guedes — Virgínia
