= Marquis of Távora =

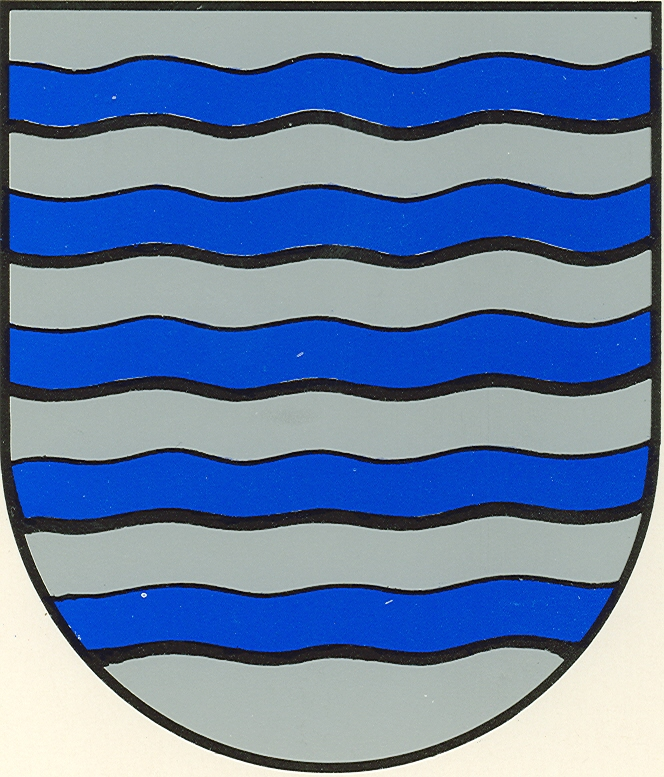
The Coat of Arms of the Távora family, Marquesses of Távora and Counts of São João da Pesqueira: Argent, five fesses wavy azure.

Count of São João da Pesqueira (in Portuguese Conde de São João da Pesqueira) was a Portuguese title of nobility created by a royal decree, dated from 21 March 1611, by King Philip II of Portugal (aka Philip III of Spain), and granted to Dom Luís Álvares de Távora, Lord of Távora.

In the 17th century this family received new honours: a royal decree of King Afonso VI of Portugal, issued on August 6, 1669, created the title of Marquis of Távora (in Portuguese Marquês de Távora) and granted it to Dom Luís Álvares de Távora, 3rd Count of São João da Pesqueira.

In 1759, these two titles were extinguished once the 4th Marquis was executed following the Távora affair.

== List of counts of São João da Pesqueira (1611) and Marquesses of Távora (1669) ==
- Luís Álvares de Távora (c.1590- ? ), 1st Count of São João da Pesqueira;
- António Luis de Távora (c.1620-1653), his son, 2nd Count of São João da Pesqueira;
- Luís Álvares de Távora (1634- ? ), his son, 3rd Count of São João da Pesqueira and 1st Marquis of Távora;
- António Luís de Távora (1656–1721), his son, 4th Count of São João da Pesqueira and 2nd Marquis of Távora;
- Luís Bernardo de Távora (1677–1718), his son, 5th Count of São João da Pesqueira;
- Leonor de Távora (1700–1759), his daughter, 6th Countess of São João da Pesqueira and 3rd Marchioness of Távora, married to her cousin Francisco de Assis de Távora, 3rd Count of Alvor. Executed;
- Luís Bernardo de Távora (1723–1759), her son, 7th Count of São João da Pesqueira and 4th Marquis of Távora. Executed.

== See also ==
- List of marquisates in Portugal
- List of countships in Portugal
- Count of Alvor
- Távora affair

== Bibliography ==
”Nobreza de Portugal e do Brasil" – Vol. III, pages 281/284; Vol III, pages 533-538. Published by Zairol Lda., Lisbon 1989.
