= Távora (Santa Maria e São Vicente) =

- Civil parish
- Location in Portugal
- Coordinates: 41.813°N 8.460°W
- Country: Portugal
- Region: Norte
- Intermunic. comm.: Alto Minho
- District: Viana do Castelo
- Municipality: Arcos de Valdevez

Area
  - Total: 6.74 km^{2} (2.60 sq mi)

Population (2011)
  - Total: 955
  - Density: 142/km^{2} (367/sq mi)
- Time zone: UTC+00:00 (WET)
  - Summer (DST): UTC+01:00 (WEST)

Távora (Santa Maria e São Vicente) is a civil parish in the municipality of Arcos de Valdevez, Portugal. It was formed in 2013 by the merger of the former parishes Santa Maria de Távora and São Vicente de Távora. The population in 2011 was 955, in an area of 6.74 km^{2}.
