= Francisco de Assis de Távora =

Portuguese noble and viceroy (1703–1759)

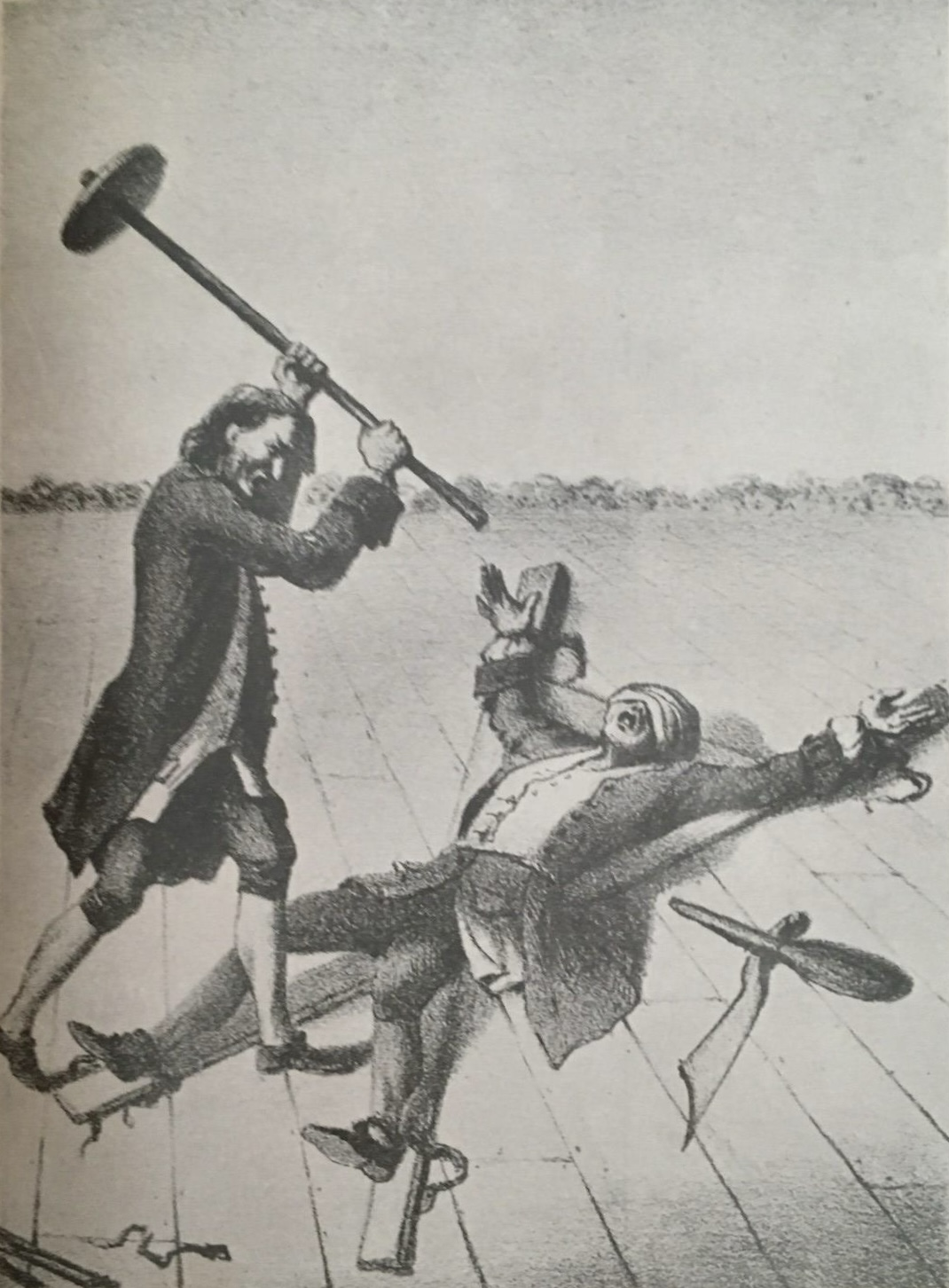
Execution of Francisco de Assis de Távora

Francisco de Assis de Távora, 3rd Marquis of Távora (7 October 1703 – 13 January 1759) was a Portuguese noble, Lieutenant General and Viceroy of Portuguese India, who was executed during the Távora affair.

== Biography ==
He was the son and heir of the 2nd Count of Alvor, Bernardo Filipe Nery de Távora, and his wife, D. Joana de Lorena. His paternal grandfather was Francisco de Távora, 1st Count of Alvor. In 1718, he married his cousin, D. Leonor de Távora, who had inherited all titles from her parents and grandparents, becoming the 6th Countess of S. João da Pesqueira and the 3rd Marchioness of Távora. These titles were also granted to her husband.

Pursuing a military career, the Marquis of Távora was appointed governor of the stronghold of Chaves and subsequently, by King John V, Viceroy of Portuguese India on 18 February 1750. Accompanied by his wife, he arrived in India on 22 September of that year. The Marquis of Távora found the State of India in a period of relative prosperity. His predecessor, the Marquis of Alorna, had undertaken highly successful campaigns against the Bhonsle and the Marathas. Following in his footsteps, the Marquis of Távora dispatched a naval expedition against the pirate Cananja and captured Ponda and Zambaulim, near Goa.

On 18 September 1754, his successor, the Count of Alva, arrived from Portugal, and the Marquis of Távora returned with his wife to Lisbon. They returned full of pride in their achievements in India and felt aggrieved at not immediately receiving all the rewards they deemed due for their services. Furthermore, his wife D. Leonor, a politically astute woman, became deeply involved in the affairs of the realm and was strongly opposed to the kingdom's rising figure, the Marquis of Pombal, whom she regarded as an arriviste.

Amidst these circumstances, the Marquis of Pombal managed to secure the prosecution of the entire Távora family on charges of attempted regicide against King Joseph I, in what became known as the Távora affair.

Consequently, Francisco de Assis was executed alongside his wife, D. Leonor, two of his sons, a brother-in-law and a son-in-law on 13 January 1759, in a brutal and bloody public execution on a scaffold in Belém, Lisbon. Their remains were subsequently burned, and the ashes were cast into the Tagus River.

=== Marriage and children ===
He had thirteen children with Leonor de Távora but only four survived childhood:

- Mariana Raimunda de Távora (1722–?), married D. Jerónimo de Ataíde, 11th Count of Atouguia, who was also executed.
- Luís Bernardo de Távora (1723–1759), married without issue. Also executed.
- Leonor Tomásia de Lorena e Távora (1729–1790), married João de Almeida Portugal, 2nd Marquis of Alorna. Had issue:
  - Leonor de Almeida Portugal, 4th Marquise of Alorna (1750–1839)
  - Maria de Almeida Portugal (1751–1786), married the 6th Count of Ribeira Grande
  - Pedro de Almeida Portugal, 3rd Marquis of Alorna (1754–1813)
- José Maria de Távora (1736–1759), no issue. Also executed.
