= Távora affair =

Political scandal of the 18th century Portuguese court

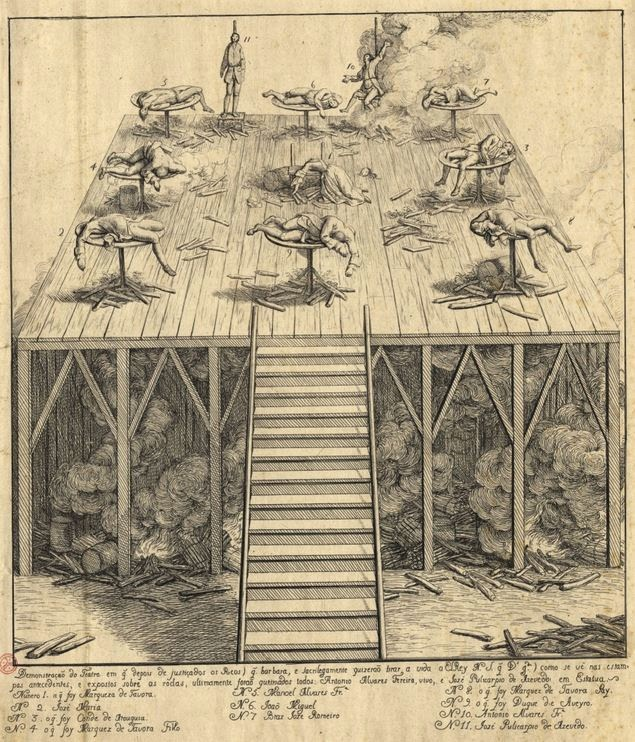
Execution of the Távoras (1759).

The Távoras affair (Portuguese: Processo dos Távoras) was a political scandal of the 18th century Portuguese court. The events triggered by the attempted assassination of King Joseph I of Portugal in 1758 ended with the public execution of the entire Távora family, their closest relatives and some servants in 1759. Some historians interpret the incident as an attempt by prime minister Sebastião José de Carvalho e Melo (later Marquis of Pombal) to curb the growing powers of the old aristocratic families.

Even today, historians doubt whether the Távoras were actually involved in the plot or whether they were the victims of a coup set up by the Prime Minister. Queen Maria I, after removing Pombal, rehabilitated the name of the Távora family in 1781, following a review of the trial.

== Prelude ==
In the aftermath of the Lisbon earthquake on 1 November 1755, which destroyed the royal palace, King Joseph I took up residence in a tent complex in Ajuda, on the outskirts of the city. This was the centre of Portuguese political and social life at the time. The King lived surrounded by his staff, led by the prime minister, Sebastião José de Carvalho e Melo, and was attended by members of the nobility.

The prime minister was a strict man, son of a country squire, with a grudge against the old nobility, who despised him. Clashes between them were frequent and tolerated by the king, who trusted Sebastião de Melo for his competent leadership after the earthquake.

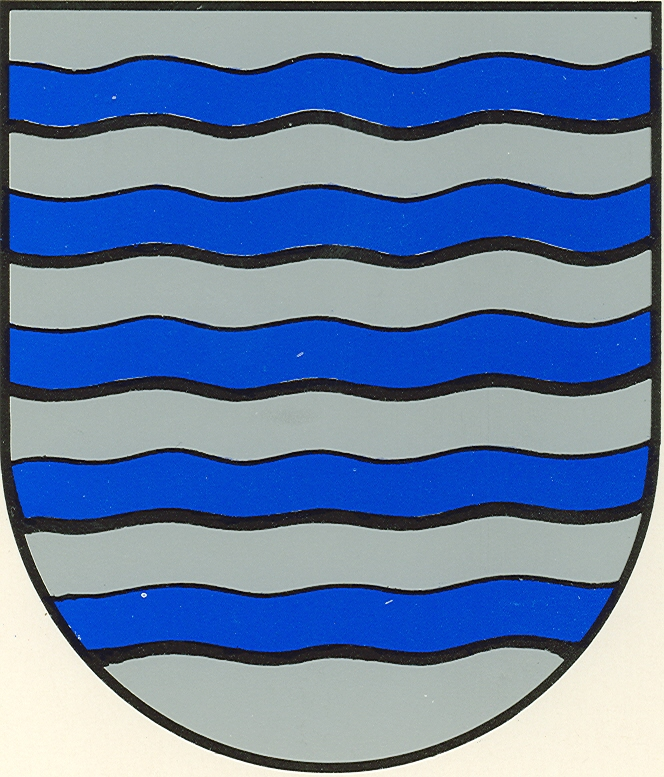
Coat of Arms of the Távora family.

King Joseph I was married to Mariana Victoria of Spain, Infanta of Spain, and had four daughters. Despite an attested happy family life (the King loved his daughters and enjoyed playing with them and taking them on nature walks), Joseph I had a favourite mistress: Marquise Teresa Leonor, wife (and aunt) of Luís Bernardo, heir of the Távora family. Luís Bernardo's parents, Marquise Leonor Tomásia de Távora, and her husband, Francisco de Assis, Count of Alvor and former Viceroy of India, headed one of the most powerful families in the Kingdom. They were related to the houses of Aveiro, Cadaval, and Alorna. They were also among the bitterest enemies of Sebastião de Melo. Leonor de Távora was politically influential, preoccupied with the affairs of the Kingdom handed to, from her perspective, an upstart with no education. She was also a devout Catholic with strong ties to the Jesuits, including her personal confessor, Gabriel Malagrida.

== Assassination attempt ==
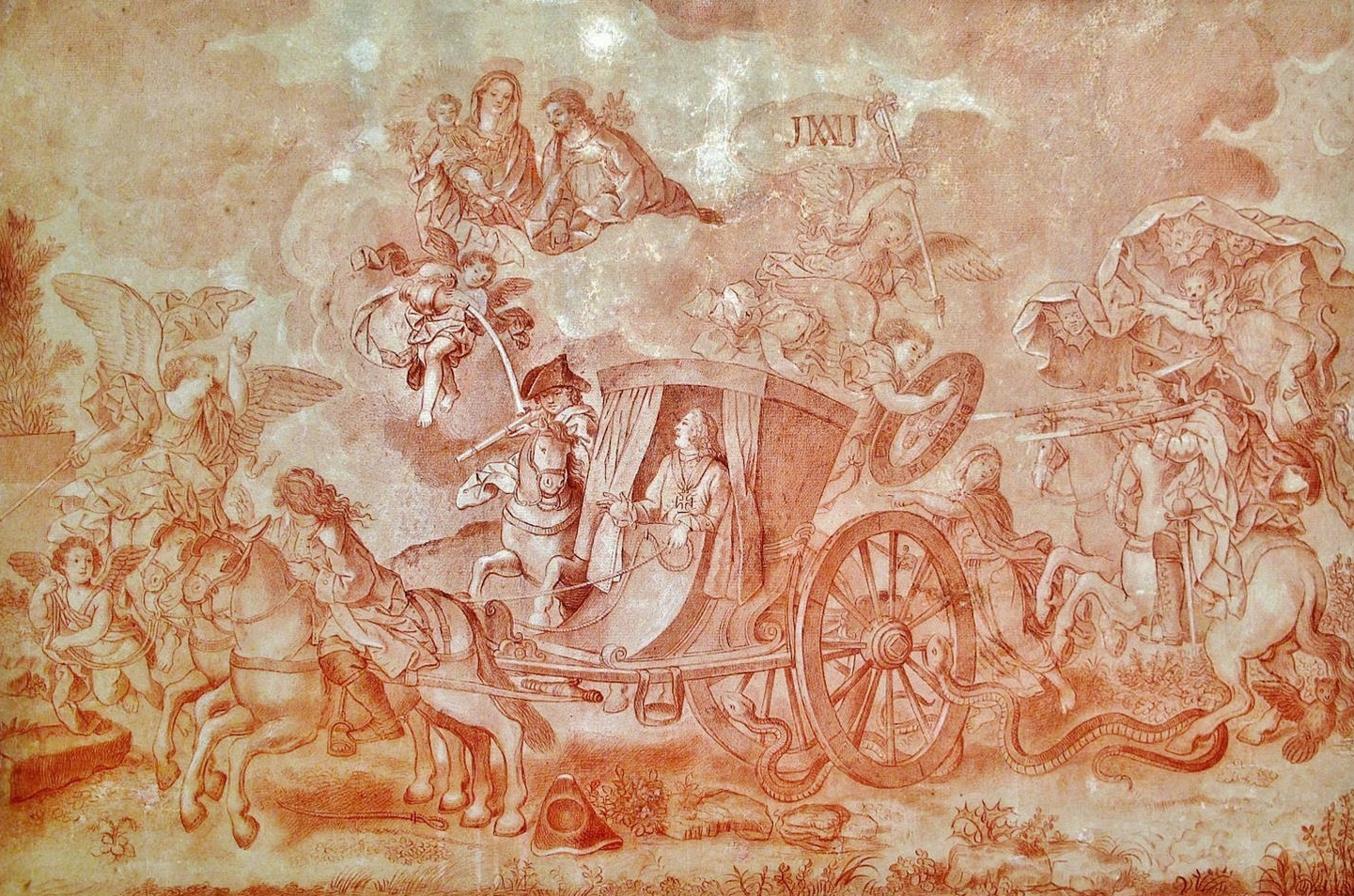
Quam mirabilia sunt opera tua, Domine! (How wonderful are your works, Lord!). c. 1758–1760 sanguine drawing by Vieira Lusitano depicting the assassination attempt of King Joseph I.

On the night of 3 September 1758, Joseph I was riding in an unmarked carriage on a secondary, unfrequented road on the outskirts of Lisbon. The King was returning to the tents of Ajuda after an evening with his mistress Marquise Teresa Leonor. Somewhere along the way two or three men intercepted the carriage and fired on its occupants. Joseph I was shot in the arm and his driver was badly wounded, but both survived and returned to Ajuda.

Sebastião de Melo took control of the situation. Concealing the attack and the King's injuries, he initiated a swift inquiry.

A few days later two men were arrested for the shootings and tortured. The men confessed their guilt and stated that they were following the orders of the Távora family, who were plotting to put the Duke of Aveiro on the throne. Both men were hanged the following day, even before the attempted regicide was made public.

== Arrests, trial and sentence ==
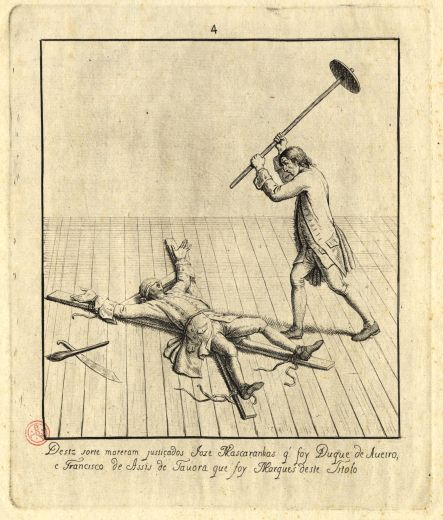
The Duke of Aveiro and the Marquis of Távora were executed by sledgehammer strikes breaking their chests and bones

Over a thousand arrests were made. In the following weeks the Marchioness Leonor de Távora, her husband the Count of Alvor, and all of their sons, daughters, and grandchildren were imprisoned. Alleged conspirators, the Duke of Aveiro and the Távoras' sons-in-law, the Marquis of Alorna, and the Count of Atouguia, were arrested with their families. The Jesuits were considered implicated in the attack, and Gabriel Malagrida, the Jesuit confessor of Leonor de Távora, was also arrested.

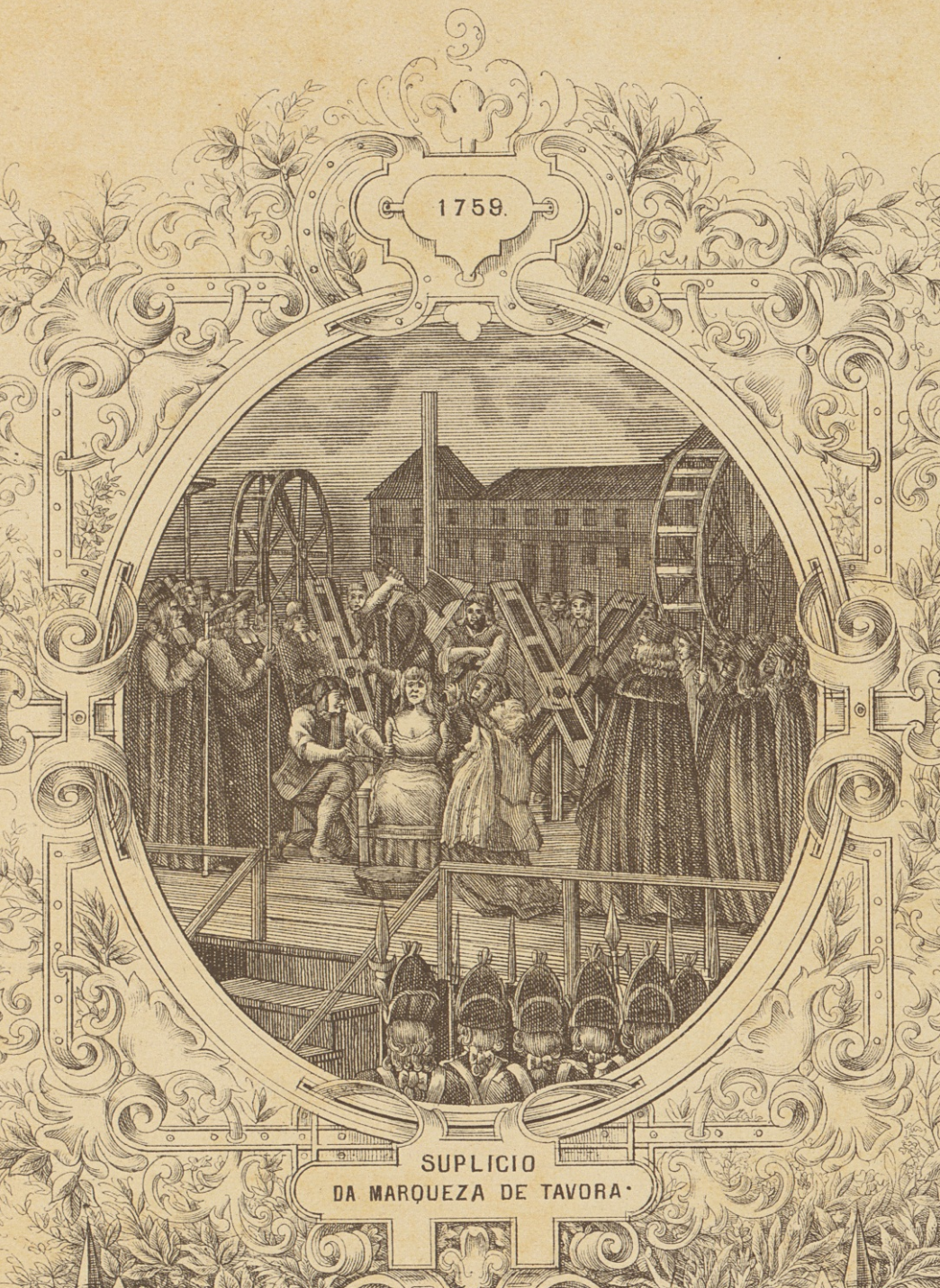
The execution of Marquise Leonor Tomásia de Távora.

All were accused of high treason and attempted regicide. The evidence presented in their common trial was simple: a) the confessions of the executed assassins; b) the murder weapon belonging to the Duke of Aveiro; and c) the assumption that only the Távoras would have known the whereabouts of the king on that evening since he was returning from a liaison with Teresa de Távora.

During the trial intense violence and torture were used to obtain confessions. That was legal, but even witnesses for the prosecution were tortured, which was not permitted by law. Their estates were confiscated by the crown, even before the trial, their palaces in Lisbon destroyed and its soil salted, their name erased from the peerage and their coat-of-arms outlawed. Most historians agree that the whole process was "full of omissions, judicial contradictions and calumnies."

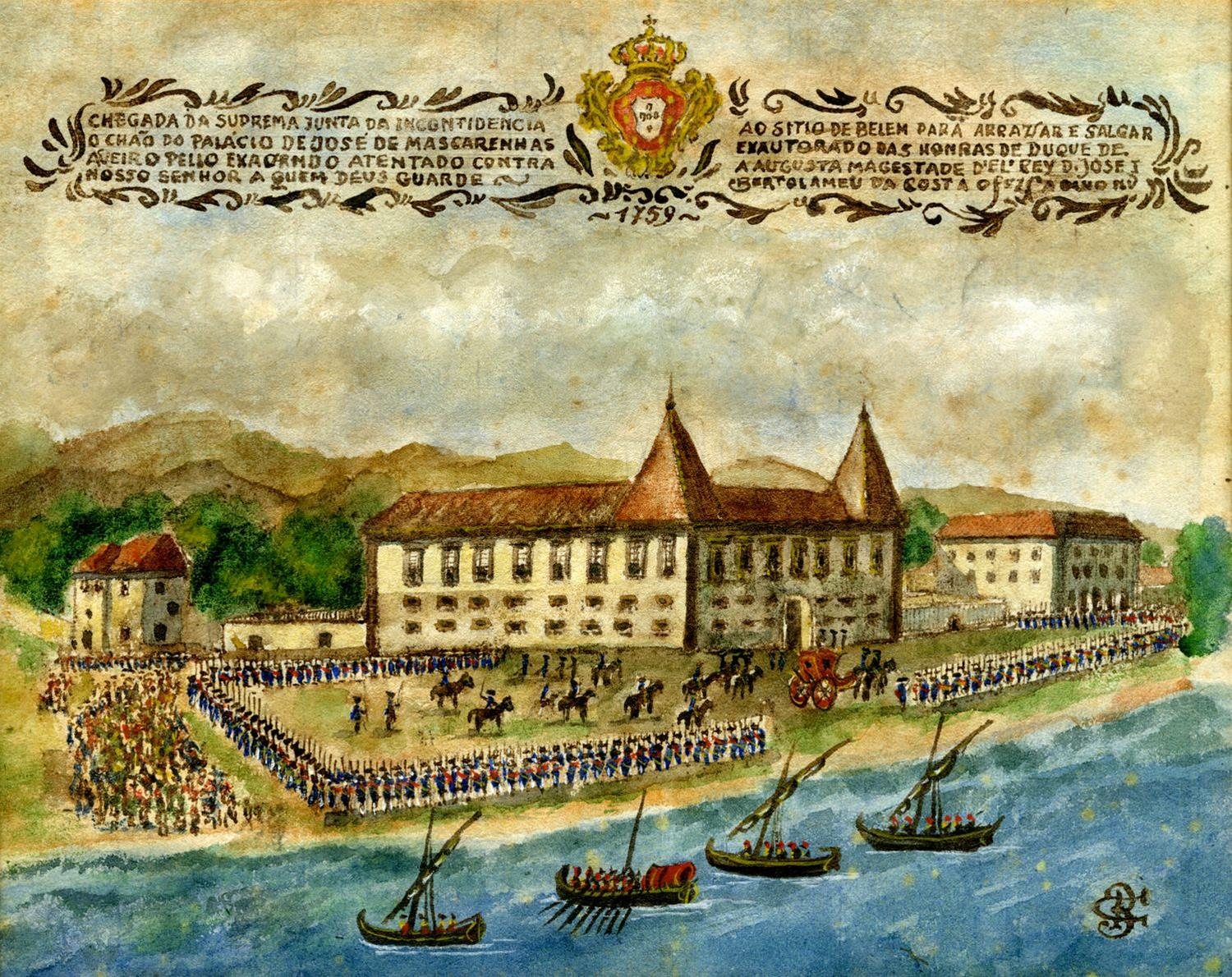
Chegada da Suprema Junta da Inconfidência ao Sítio de Belém..., painting by Bartolomeu da Costa, 1759, depicting the demolition and salting of José Mascarenhas' palace by the Suprema Junta da Inconfidência

A special court, the Suprema Junta da Inconfidência, was authorised to invent the sentences to be imposed on those convicted, because none of those laid down in the law seemed severe enough for them. The original sentence ordered the execution of entire families, including women and children. Only the intervention of Queen Mariana and Maria Francisca, heiress to the throne, saved most of them.

The Marchioness, however, was not spared. She and the other defendants sentenced to death were publicly tortured and executed on 13 January 1759, in a field near Lisbon. The King was present at the executions with his bewildered court. The Távoras were their peers and kin, but the prime minister wanted the lesson driven home.

=== Executions ===
In Belém, during the night from the 12 to the 13 January 1759, a scaffold was built. In the morning, Marquise Leonor de Távora went up the stairs between two priests. Three executioners showed her the instruments of execution one by one, and explained to her how her husband, her children, and her daughter's husband would die: the sledgehammer to break the chests and the bones, the garrote to strangulate. Then one executioner made her sit down, blindfolded, and beheaded her.

Then the Marquise's sons, José Maria de Távora and Luís Bernardo, came forward for the execution. They were tied to an aspa (a St. Andrew's Cross) and at the same time as the main executioner put them to death by garrote, his helpers broke their bones with sledgehammers. Similarly executed were Jerónimo de Ataíde, Count of Atouguia, and the commoners Manuel Álvares Ferreira, Brás José Romeiro, and João Miguel.

Finally, the Marquis of Távora and José Mascarenhas, Duke of Aveiro were executed after showing them the dismembered bodies, and the instruments of their deaths. Bound to the aspas, they were struck with an eight kilogram sledgehammer until they died.

Afterward, the ground was salted, to prevent future growth of vegetation. To this day, in this location there remains an alley called Beco do Chão Salgado ("Alley of the Salted Ground"); on its corner stands a shame memorial with an inscription just below waist height, overlooked by no saints' statues in niches - this disposition effectively converted the memorial into a popular public urinal. The inscription on the monument (translated to English) reads:

In this place were razed to the ground and salted the houses of José Mascarenhas, stripped of the honours of Duque de Aveiro and others, convicted by sentence proclaimed in the Supreme Court of Inconfidences on the 12th of January 1759. Brought to Justice as one of the leaders of the most barbarous and execrable upheaval that, on the night of the 3rd of September 1758, was committed against the most royal and sacred person of the Lord Joseph I. On this infamous land nothing may be built for all time.

== Aftermath ==
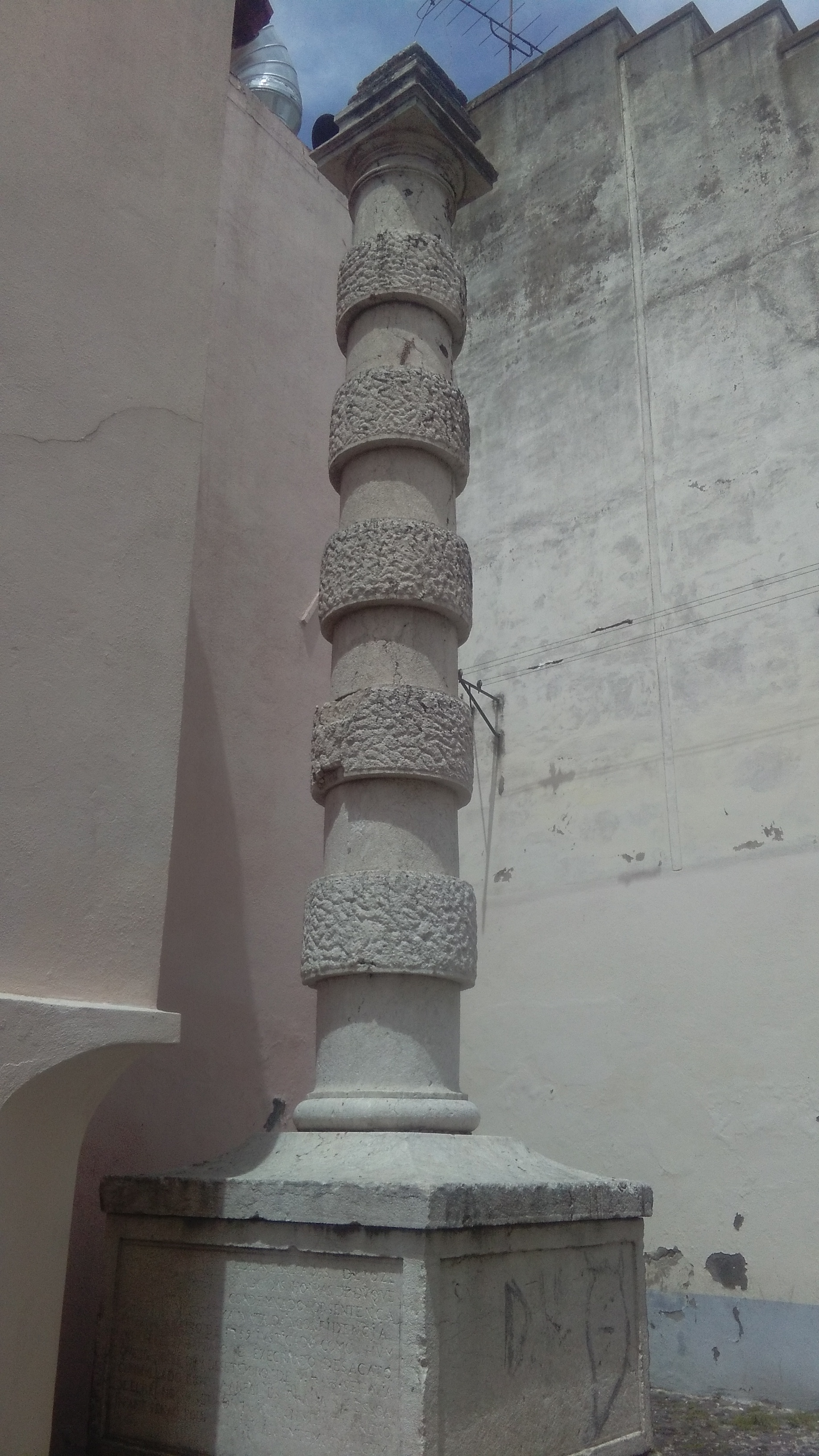
Stone memorial of Aveiro's shame in Belém, Lisbon

Gabriel Malagrida was denounced to the Portuguese Inquisition by Sebastião de Melo, himself a familiar (i.e. a lay officer of the inquisition), with the accusation of heresy. He was garroted and burned at the stake in September 1761. The Jesuit Order was outlawed that same year. All its estates were confiscated and all Jesuits expelled from Portuguese territory, both in Europe and the colonies.

The Alorna family and the daughters of the Duke of Aveiro were sentenced to life imprisonment in various monasteries and convents. As for the King's mistress, the young Marquise Teresa Leonor, according to the British envoy in Lisbon, she was sent to a not very strict convent, where she lived "very much at her ease." Her relations with King Joseph ended after the alleged assassination attempt, but he ordered that she be given a large pension, and, not surprisingly, there is not the slightest reference to her in the case file.

Sebastião de Melo was made Count of Oeiras for his competent handling of the affair, and later, in 1770, was promoted to Marquis of Pombal, the name by which he is known today.

== Discussion ==
The guilt or innocence of the Távoras is still debated today by Portuguese historians. On the one hand, the tense relations between the aristocracy and the king are well documented. The lack of a male heir to the throne displeased most of them and, indeed, the Duke of Aveiro was a possible candidate for succession.

On the other hand, some refer to a convenient coincidence: with the conviction of the Távoras and the Jesuits, all enemies of Sebastião de Melo disappeared and the nobility was tamed. Moreover, the Távoras' defenders argue that the attempted murder of Joseph I might have been a random attack by highway robbers since the king was travelling without guard or sign of rank on a dangerous Lisbon road. Another indication of their possible innocence is the fact that none of the Távoras or their allies tried to escape from Portugal in the days following the attack.

== See also ==
- A-dos-Ruivos – The village where the Távora family took refuge when they were being pursued by the Marquis of Pombal.

== Bibliography ==
- Alves, Patrícia Woolley (2011) - D. João de Almeida Portugal e a Revisão do Processo dos Távoras: conflitos, intrigas e linguagens políticas em Portugal nos finais do Antigo Regime (c.1777-1802) - (in Portuguese) - Universidade Federal Fluminense (Brazil)
- Castelo Branco, Camilo (1900) - Perfil do Marquês de Pombal - (in Portuguese) - Lopes & Ca.
- Chauvin, Jean Pierre (2016) - Marquês de Pombal: retrato sem moldura (in Portuguese) - in Revista de Estudos de Cultura, Universidade de São Paulo (Brazil)
- Dutra, Francis A.(1998) - The Wounding of King José I: Accident or Assassination Attempt? - Penn State University Press (in Mediterranean Studies, Vol. 7 (1998), pp. 221–229)
- Maxwell, Kenneth (1995) - Pombal, Paradox of the Enlightenment - Cambridge University Press
- Oliveira Santos, Guilherme de; Correia, Leandro; Carlos Reis, Roberto (2017) - O processo dos Távoras: A Revisão - Instauração, depoimentos e sentenças - Caleidoscopio
- Ramos, Rui; Vasconcelos e Sousa, Bernardo; Gonçalo Monteiro, Nuno (2021) - História de Portugal (in Portuguese) - Publicações Dom Quixote
- Saraiva, José Hermano (1986) - História concisa de Portugal (10.ª edição, in Portuguese) - Publicações Europa-América
