= Luís Bernardo de Távora, 4th Marquis of Távora =

D. Luís Bernardo de Távora, 4th Marquis of Távora and 7th Count of São João da Pesqueira (29 August 1723 – 13 January 1759) was a Portuguese nobleman. He was one of the thirteen people executed in Lisbon, on 13 January 1759, convicted of attempting to kill the King Joseph I of Portugal.

He was the first son of Francisco de Assis de Távora, 3rd Count of Alvor, and Leonor Tomásia de Távora, 3rd Marquise of Távora. Luís Bernardo married his aunt, sister of his father, D. Teresa de Távora e Lorena on 8 July 1742. Neither he nor Teresa had any descent.

== See also ==
- Távora affair
