= Leonor Tomásia de Távora, 3rd Marquise of Távora =

Leonor Tomásia de Távora
- Marquise of Távora
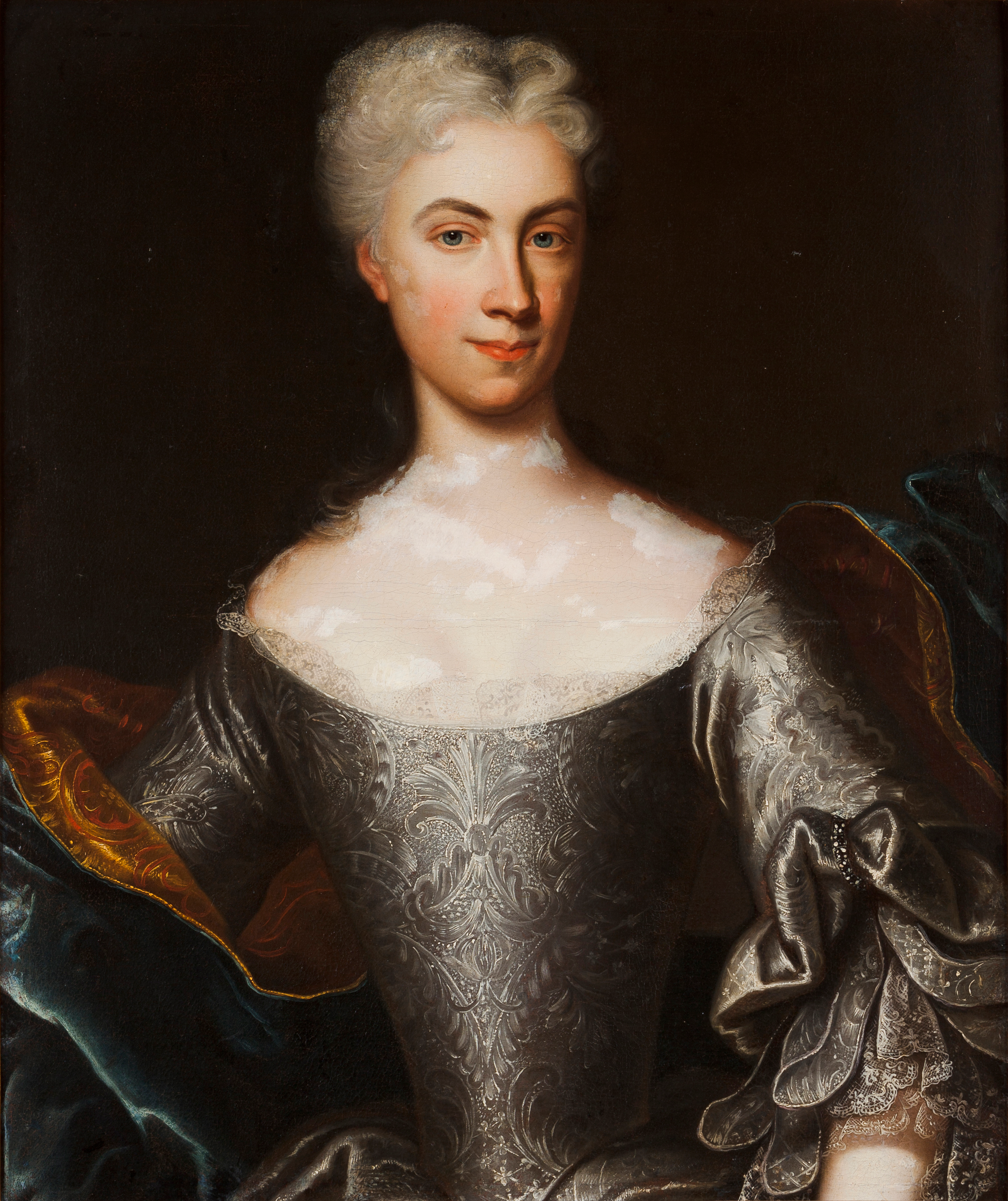
- Portrait, c. 18th century
- Born: 15 March 1700
- Died: 13 January 1759 (aged 58); Lisbon
- Spouses: Francisco de Assis de Távora, 3rd Count of Alvor

Leonor Tomásia de Távora, 3rd Marchioness of Távora (15 March 1700 - 13 January 1759), anglicized as Eleanor Thomasine of Távora, was a Portuguese noblewoman, most notable for being one of those executed by the Marquis of Pombal during the Távora affair.

== Life ==
Leonor Tomásia de Távora was born on 15 March 1700 to Luís Bernardo de Távora, 5th Count of São João da Pesqueira, and Ana de Lorena, daughter of Nuno Álvares Pereira de Melo, 1st Duke of Cadaval, in one of the oldest aristocratic families of Portugal.

D. Leonor became her father's sole heir in 1716, when her brother, D. António Bernardo de Távora (1699–1716), died at the age of 17. Two years later, her father also passed away, and she became, by right, the 6th Countess of São João da Pesqueira and 3rd Marquise of Távora.

Also in 1718, she married her cousin Francisco de Assis de Távora (1703–1759), 3rd Count of Alvor. She accompanied her husband to India when he served as Viceroy of Portuguese India between 1750 and 1754. Back in Portugal and used to a life in great luxury, she did not easily resign herself to the lack of luster in her private life in Lisbon, where she did not hold the high status she had expected. Proud, possessed of a spirited, masculine nature and great ambition, and relying on the impunity afforded by her rank, she made no secret of her disdain for Secretary of State the Marquis of Pombal or her opposition to his ministry.

Moreover, she had formed a close bond with the Jesuits. Father Gabriel Malagrida was not merely her spiritual confessor but also the guiding force behind all her actions. Consequently, her household became a hotbed, if not of conspiracy, then certainly of opposition, which the Marquis of Pombal could not overlook. As a result, she was the first to be accused of complicity in the 1758 assassination attempt against King José and was deemed the crime's principal instigator.

She was arrested at her home on 13 December 1758 and condemned to death 12 January 1759, together with a large part of her family. This became known as the Távora affair. The sentence also ordered the confiscation of all her assets by the Royal Treasury. She was publicly executed on 13 January 1759, together with her husband, two sons and a son-in-law.

=== Marriage and children ===
She had thirteen children with Francisco de Assis de Távora, 3rd Count of Alvor, but only four survived childhood :

- Mariana Raimunda de Távora (1722-?), married D. Jerónimo de Ataíde, 11th Count of Atouguia, who was also executed.
- Luís Bernardo de Távora (1723-1759), married without issue. Also executed.
- Leonor Tomásia de Lorena e Távora (1729-1790), married João de Almeida Portugal, 2nd Marquis of Alorna. Had issue:
  - Leonor de Almeida Portugal, 4th Marquise of Alorna (1750–1839)
  - Maria de Almeida Portugal (1751–1786), married the 6th Count of Ribeira Grande
  - Pedro de Almeida Portugal, 3rd Marquis of Alorna (1754–1813)
- José Maria de Távora (1736-1759), no issue. Also executed.

== See also ==
- Távora affair
