= Count of Coculim =

Count of Coculim is a Portuguese title of nobility created by King Afonso VI of Portugal, by a decree of 3 May 1666, in favour of D. Francisco Mascarenhas, 1st Count of Coculim.

== Title holders ==
1. D. Francisco Mascarenhas
2. D. Filipe Mascarenhas
3. D. Francisco Mascarenhas
4. D. Joaquim de Mascarenhas
5. D. João José Luís de Mascarenhas Barreto, 6.º Marquês de Fronteira e 7.º conde da Torre
6. D. José Trazimundo de Mascarenhas Barreto, 7.º Marquês de Fronteira, 8.º conde da Torre e 10.º conde de Assumar
7. D. José Maria Mascarenhas, 10.º Marquês de Fronteira, 11.º conde da Torre, 12.º conde de Assumar e pretendente ao título de Marquês de Alorna

After the setting up of the Republic and the end of the nobility system, Fernando José Fernandes Costa Mascarenhas and D. António Infante da Câmara Mascarenhas claimed the title.
