= Leonor de Almeida Portugal, Marquise of Alorna =

Portuguese noblewoman, painter and poet

Her Ladyship The Marquise of Alorna
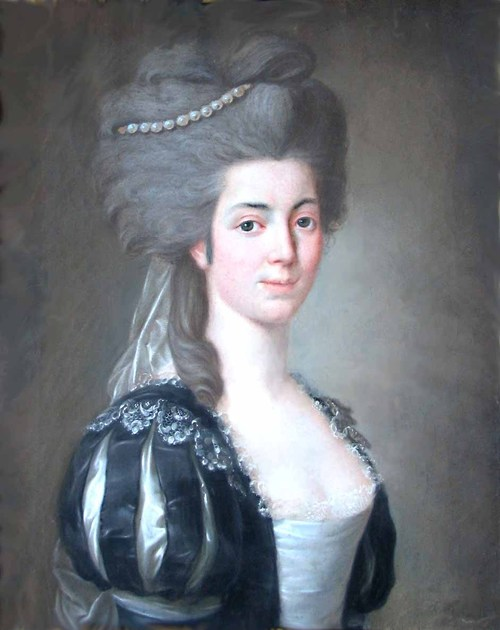
- Portrait by Józef Pitschmann c. 1780
- Born: Leonor de Almeida Portugal de Lorena e Lencastre; 31 October 1750; Lisbon, Kingdom of Portugal
- Died: 11 October 1839 (aged 88); Lisbon, Kingdom of Portugal
- Resting place: Cemitério dos Prazeres, Lisbon
- Occupations: Poet, writer, painter
- Spouse: Count Carlos Pedro Maria José Augusto of Oyenhausen-Grevenburg
- Relatives: João de Almeida Portugal, 2nd Marquis of Alorna (father); Leonor de Lorena e Távora (mother)
- Writing career
- Pen name: Alcipe
- Language: Portuguese
- Period: Romanticism

D. Leonor de Almeida Portugal, 4th Marquise of Alorna, 7th Countess of Assumar (31 October 1750 – 11 October 1839) was a Portuguese noblewoman, painter, and poet. Commonly known by her penname, Alcipe, the Marquise was a prime figure in the Portuguese Neoclassic a proto-Romantic literary scene, while still a follower of Neoclassicism when it came to painting.

Leonor was born into one of the many branches of the House of Távora, Portugal's most illustrious and powerful noble family at the time. This being said, the time of her birth and the subsequent years were a time of great trouble for the House of Távora, as they had been accused of treason against King José I of Portugal, in a series of events known as the Távora affair. Because of the unfortunate events in her early childhood, Leonor spent nineteen years forcibly imprisoned in a convent, where she spent most of her time reading and writing poetry. Her early success as a poet at the convent started her lifelong career which would lead her to becoming one of Europe's most noteworthy literary figures at the time.

The occupation of Leonor's husband, Count Carlos Pedro of Oyenhausen-Groewenbourg, as a diplomat in the service of Queen Maria I of Portugal, meant that Leonor and her family spent much of their lives traveling the courts of Europe, most notably the Austrian Imperial Court at Vienna. Her travels allowed Leonor to acquaint herself with many of Europe's great minds of the time, thus spreading her literary and artistic influence throughout the continent and expanding Leonor's views and perceptions, both in poetry and in painting.

== Early life ==
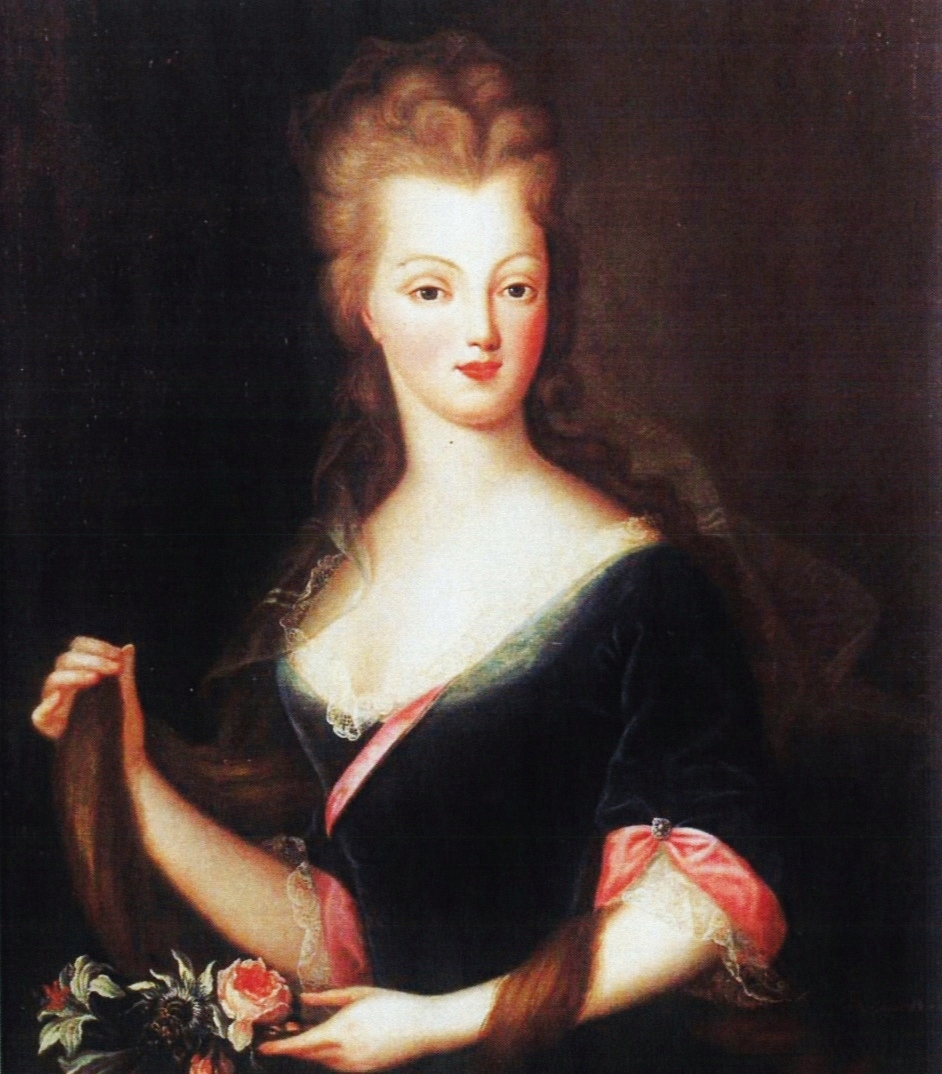
Leonor's grandmother, Leonor Tomásia de Távora, 3rd Marquise of Távora.

D. Leonor de Almeida Portugal was born in Lisbon, on 31 October 1750, to João de Almeida Portugal, 2nd Marquis of Alorna and 5th Count of Assumar, and Leonor de Lorena e Távora, daughter of Leonor Tomásia de Távora, 3rd Marchioness of Távora. She was born into the House of Távora, one of the most illustrious noble families in Portugal. Her family's wealth and power, however, achieved them suspicion from King José I's Prime Minister Sebastião José de Carvalho e Melo, 1st Marquis of Pombal. These tensions between the Távoras and the Marquis of Pombal accumulated in 1758, when Leonor was eight years old, in the Távora affair. The affair saw the execution of her maternal grandparents and Leonor and her mother's forced placement in the Convent of São Félix of Chelas, until 1777. Likewise, her father and brother were imprisoned in the Tower of Belém.

While in the convent at Chelas, Leonor lived with her mother and sister. She devoted her time to studying the works of Rousseau, Voltaire, Montesquieu, Pierre Bayle, and the Encyclopedia of Diderot. As there was not much for a young girl to do at a convent, Leonor spent most of her time composing poems and other lyrical pieces. It is during her childhood at the convent when Leonor began her career as a poet, publishing her first work, the Poems of Chelas. It was also in the convent where she came in contact with famed poets and members of the Portuguese literary scene, convents and monasteries having been a traditional place for refuge by writers and artists in Portugal.

The convent was often a location of retreat to the members of the Arcadia, a literary society, and to distinguished poets like Francisco Manuel do Nascimento, best known by his pen-name, Filinto Elísio. Nascimento, having read the Poems of Chelas, sought out Leonor, to listen her works and discuss poetry with her, and eventually became her tutor in literature, poetry, and Latin. Nascimento's pen-name was, in fact, given to him by Leonor, while he was her tutor at the convent. It was also during her time at the convent when Leonor started being called Alcipe, as the nuns often gave nicknames to the young girls at the convent, as they also gave Leonor's sister, Maria de Almeida Portugal, the nickname Dafne.

Leonor finally left the convent in 1777, when she was twenty-seven years old, at the orders of the newly acclaimed Queen Maria I, who sought to reverse all the policies and actions of the Marquis of Pombal, whom she despised. Similarly, her father and brother were released from Belém Tower and the two branches of the family reunited. The family's former palaces, the envy of the Portuguese nobility, had been destroyed by order of the Marquis of Pombal, and thus the family moved to the Quinta of Vale de Nabais, outside of Lisbon, which they renamed Quinta of Alorna. Though reduced from their previous standing, the family quickly rose in the Portuguese court and nobility. Leonor rapidly became a personality of the aristocracy, her intelligence and charm having captivated the nobles who expected a girl ruined by a forced convent life.

== Marriage ==
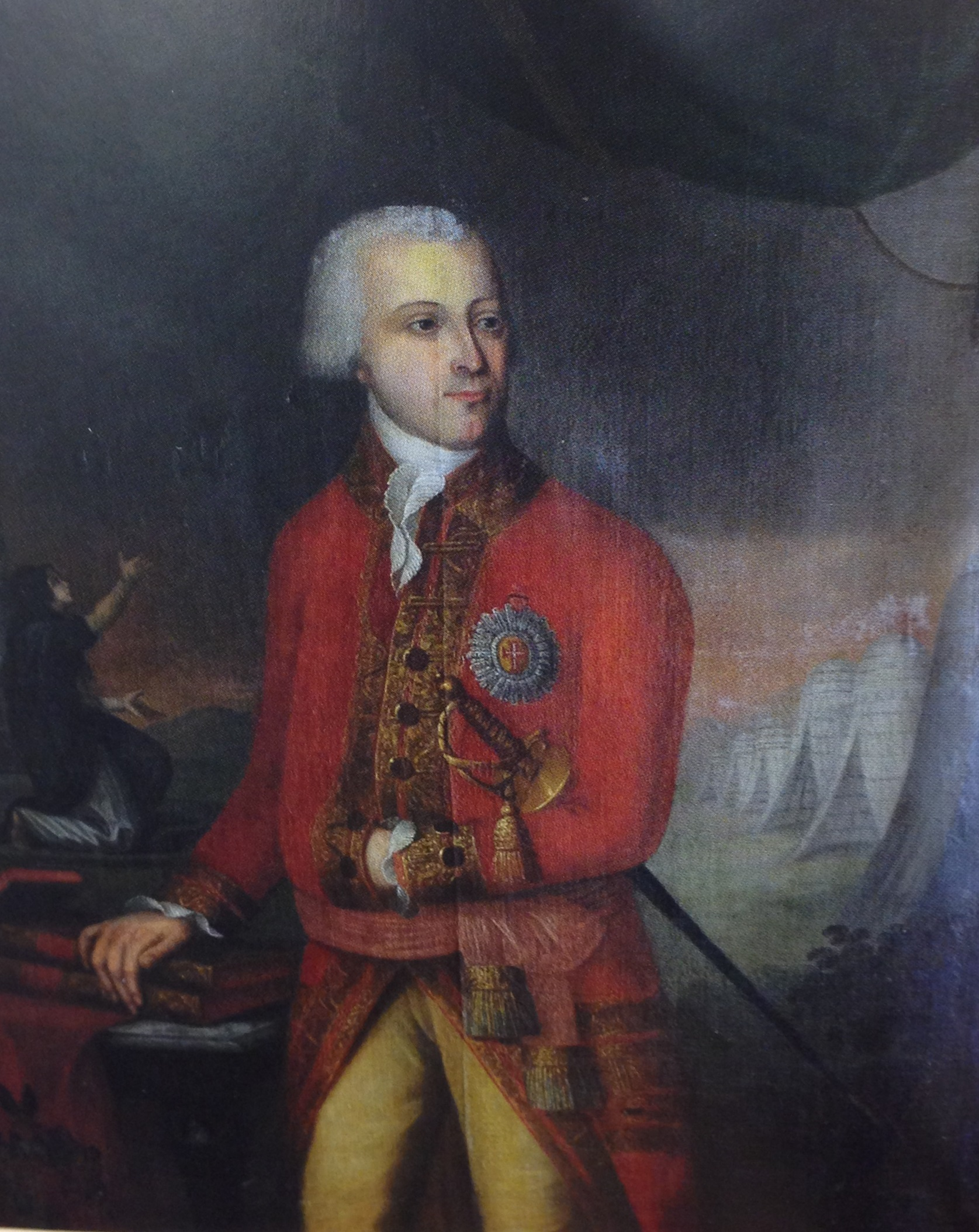
Carlos Pedro Maria José Augusto, Count of Oyenhausen-Groewenbourg.

Two years after her release from her imprisoned life at the convent, Leonor already had numerous suitors for her hand in marriage. Her prime suitor was Carlos Pedro Maria José Augusto, Count of Oyenhausen-Grevenburg, a nobleman and military-man from the Holy Roman Empire. The Count served in the Seven Years' War, as an aide-de-camp to General Frederick Charles Ferdinand, Duke of Brunswick-Lüneburg. In 1762, Carlos Pedro came to Portugal with his cousin, William, Count of Schaumburg-Lippe, who was invited by the Marquis of Pombal to train the Portuguese army.

Carlos Pedro went into the service of Queen Maria I, where he distinguished himself as a notable military-man and honourable statesman. His position and reputation made him the prime candidate for Leonor's hand and thus the two married on 15 February 1779. Present were Queen Maria I and King Pedro III, Leonor's godparents, alongside many of the most important nobles at the Portuguese Royal Court. As a gift to the couple, Queen Maria I invested Carlos Pedro as a knight of the Order of Christ, Portugal's highest and noblest order.

== Vienna ==
In 1779, Count Carlos Pedro moved the couple to Porto, as he was made commander of the VI Royal Infantry Regiment, which was based in that city. While in Porto, Leonor bore the couple's first child, Leonor Benedita de Almeida e Oyenhausen. His post in Porto would only be temporary, for in 1780, Queen Maria I appointed Count Carlos Pedro as her minister plenipotentiary to the Imperial Court of Vienna and the couple moved thereafter. On the way to Vienna, Leonor and Count Carlos Pedro were received by the courts of King Carlos III of Spain and Louis XVI of France. While in Vienna, Leonor became a prominent member of the local poetry scene and distinguished herself as a notable painter. Though she was often sick, due to the difference of the Austrian climate to the Portuguese one, Leonor bore two children: Juliana de Almeida e Oyenhausen, on 20 August 1782, and Frederica de Almeida e Oyenhausen, on 1 September 1784.

In Vienna, Leonor made acquaintances with many of Europe's great minds and personalities, from Germaine de Staël to Jacques Necker. Leonor even won the favours of Empress Maria Theresa of Austria and her successor, Joseph II of Austria, who made her a dame of the Order of the Starry Cross. When Pope Pius VI visited the Imperial Viennese Court, he received a private audience with Leonor, where she was decorated by the Supreme Pontiff. While a great success in her new Austrian home, Leonor still kept contact with her family and the Royal Court back in Portugal. She often sent her works back to Portugal, most notably a painting entitled Soledade, to her father, and An Alegory of Conjugal Love, to Princess Benedita, wife of José, Prince of Brazil, and a copy of a painting by Guido Reni, to Queen Maria I. In 1785, Leonor and her family were recalled back to Lisbon.

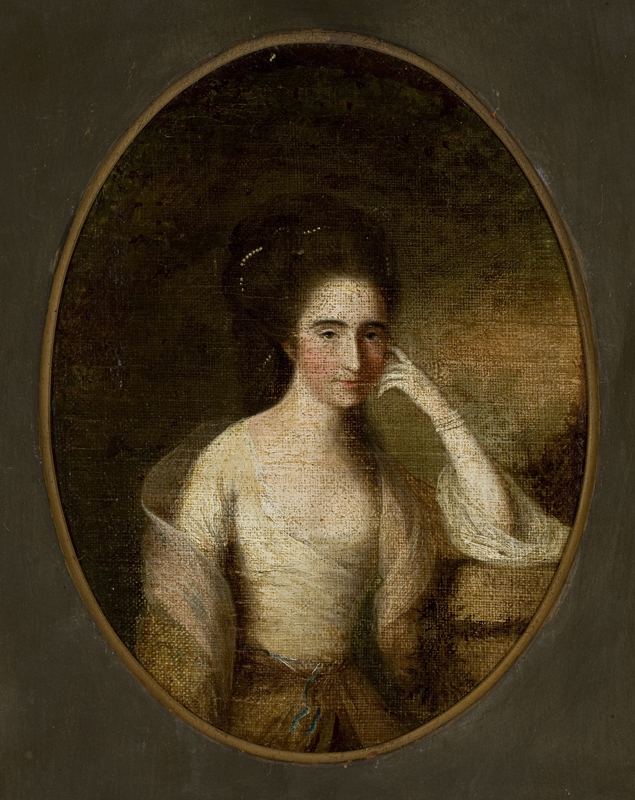
A self-portrait of Leonor de Almeida Portugal, while at the Viennese Court.

== Return to Portugal ==
Leonor and her family moved back to Portugal in 1785, when Count Carlos Pedro, was appointed as Lieutenant-General of the I Royal Infantry. Leonor became a lady-in-waiting to Princess Carlota Joaquina, the wife of João, Prince of Brazil, the son of Leonor's god-parents, Queen Maria I and King Pedro III. Being a high-ranking official of the Portuguese Royal Court, Leonor became a popular personality very quickly and she opened a literary salon, one of the most exclusive and notable in the kingdom. Leonor even drew up some of the preliminary drafts for the Royal Palace of Ajuda, though they were substituted for plans with a more contemporary style.

In 1790, Count Carlos Pedro was appointed Governor-General of the Kingdom of the Algarves, and so the family moved, once again, to Faro. The family's stay, however, was cut short, for on 3 March 1793, Leonor's husband died at the age of 54. The family subsequently moved to their properties in the Almeirim Municipality, in the Ribatejo Province. There, Leonor devoted herself to the education of her six children, educating them in all the classics, as she had been educated in her early years in the Convent of Chelas. In 1800, Leonor was able to marry her daughter, Juliana de Almeida e Oyenhausen, to Aires José Maria de Saldanha Albuquerque Coutinho Matos e Noronha, 2nd Count of Ega.

In 1802, Leonor's father, João de Almeida Portugal, 2nd Marquis of Alorna, died. Her brother, Pedro de Almeida Portugal, succeeded her father as Marquis of Alorna. Grief-stricken, Leonor took her family to London, where she stayed in the palace of Domingos de Sousa Coutinho, Count of Funchal, the Portuguese ambassador to the United Kingdom.

== Napoleonic Wars ==
Leonor stayed in England until 1809. The reason for her return to Portugal was her brother's appointment as Commander of the Portuguese Legion and as a major-general in the Napoleonic Forces in Spain. Similarly, Leonor's daughter, Juliana, became the official mistress to General Jean-Andoche Junot, General of the Napoleonic Forces in Spain and Portugal. Though she had security through her family relations in the invading Napoleonic forces, Leonor sent her only son, João Carlos Ulrico de Almeida e Oyenhausen, Count of Oyenhausen-Groewenbourg, to join the Portuguese Royal Court in Rio de Janeiro.

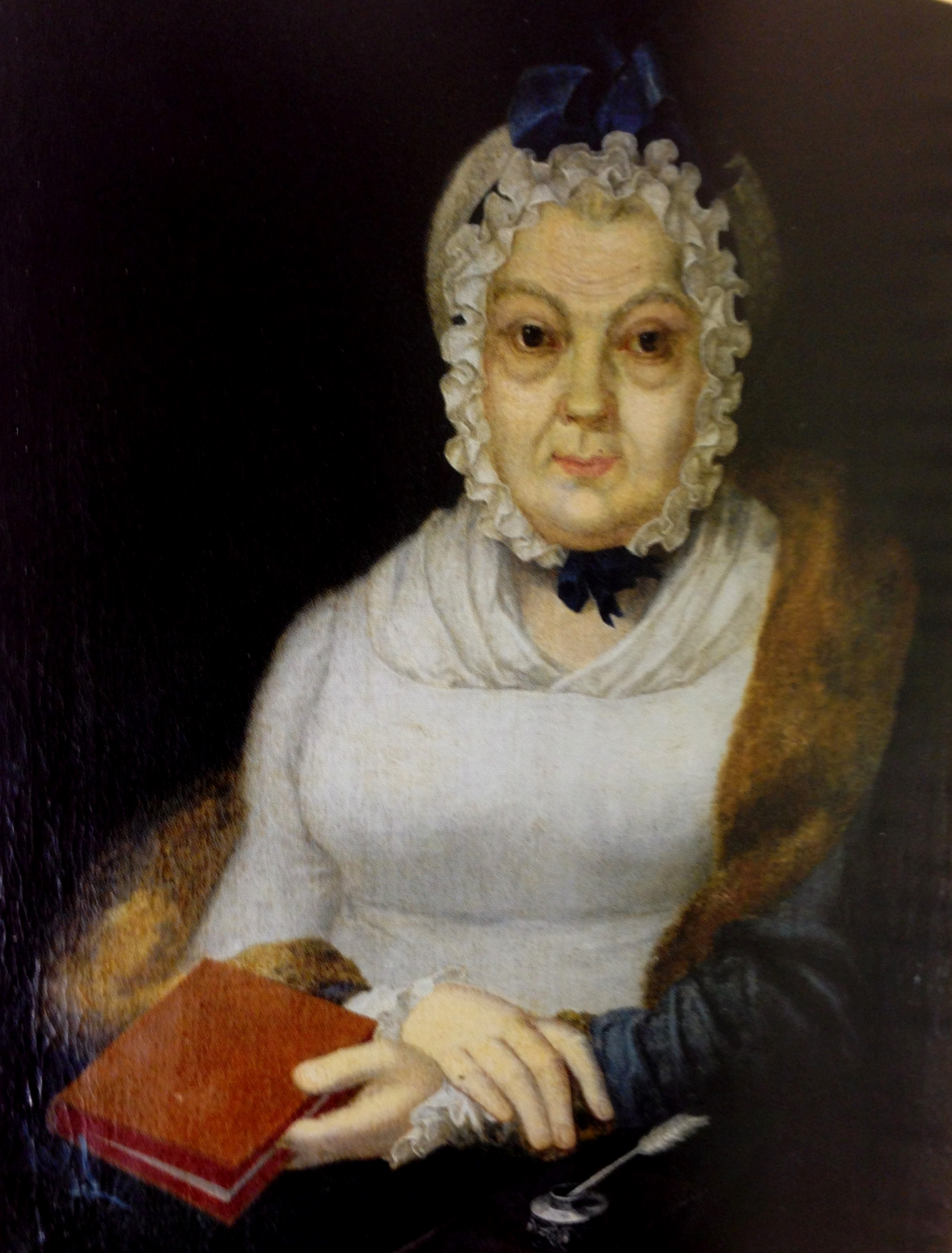
Leonor de Almeida Portugal, Marquise of Alorna, in the later part of her life.

When Leonor's brother was dismissed from his position as Commander of the Portuguese Legion, in 1810, Leonor returned to England. She stayed there until 1814, the year after her brother, Pedro de Almeida Portugal, 3rd Marquis of Alorna, died without any living descendants and Leonor became the rightful heir to the title. In order to acquire the title and all properties associated with it, Leonor applied for a license to return to Portugal and a recognition of the title from the Prince Regent João, Prince of Brazil. In between returning to Portugal and obtaining recognition for her titles, Leonor and her children stayed at the Palace of the Marquises of Fronteira, the home of her daughter, Leonor Benedita de Almeida e Oyenhausen, and son-in-law, João José Luís de Mascarenhas Barreto, 6th Marquis of Fronteira. Upon recognition of her titles, Leonor became Marquise of Alorna, though not Countess of Assumar, as it was a subsidiary title for her heir, and the owner of the two quintas associated with the Marquis of Alorna and an annual allowance of 12,000 cruzados, as payment for the services of her brother and father.

== Later life ==
After the Napoleonic Wars, Leonor lived a very isolated life in her estate at the Quinta of Alorna. Though foreign wars no longer plagued Portugal, the Liberal Wars and Brazilian War of Independence would make Portugal unstable, and thus Leonor preferred to seclude herself from war, which had taken so many of her family members. In 1822, Leonor's only son, João Carlos Ulrico de Almeida e Oyenhausen, Count of Oyenhausen-Groewenbourg, died while serving as the Lieutenant-Colonel of the IV Royal Cavalry. Count João Carlos's death meant that the heir to both Leonor and the deceased Count Carlos Pedro's titles became Leonor Benedita de Almeida e Oyenhausen, and thus she became the Countess of Oyenhausen-Groewenbourg and Countess of Assumar.

Leonor only reintroduced herself to Portuguese society in 1826, when she participated as High-Chamberlady to Infanta Isabel Maria of Portugal, the then Regent of Portugal, at the opening of the Portuguese Cortes. In 1828, she participated in the ceremony where Isabel Maria handed the regency of the kingdom to her brother, the future King Miguel I of Portugal. When King Pedro IV of Portugal won the Liberal Wars, in 1834, and restored Queen Maria II of Portugal to the throne, Leonor led the chorus at Queen Maria II's acclamation in the Cathedral of Lisbon. She also participated in King Pedro IV's funeral, later that year.

Leonor was made a Dame of the Order of Saint Isabel, by Queen Maria II, and a Member of the Order of the Starry Cross, by Caroline Augusta of Bavaria, Empress of Austria. As a prominent member of the Portuguese High Nobility, Leonor would customarily have attended the marriage of Queen Maria II to Ferdinand of Saxe-Goburg and Gotha, but she was unable to, due to her advanced age. The newly-wedded royal couple, however, visited Leonor the next day. In 1836, Leonor moved permanently to the Palace of the Marquises of Fronteira, where she could be closer to her daughter, Leonor Benedita de Almeida e Oyenhausen, Countess of Assumar, and grandson, José Trasimundo Mascarenhas Barreto, 7th Marquis of Fronteira. Leonor died at the palace on 11 October 1839.

== Works ==
- Poemas de Chelas; Lisbon, 1772.
- Elegia à Morte de S. A. R. o Principe do Brazil O sr. D. José; Lisbon, 1788.
- De Buonaparte e dos Bourbons; e da Necessidade de nos Unirmos aos nossos Legitimos Principes, para a Felicidade da França e da Europa; London, 1814.
- Obras poeticas; Lisbon, 1844.
- Estudo Biographico- Critico, a Respeito da Litteratura Portugueza; Madrid, 1869.

== Genealogy ==
=== Ancestry ===
Ancestors of Leonor de Almeida Portugal, Marquise of Alorna

8. João de Almeida Portugal, 2nd Count of Assumar
4. Pedro Miguel de Almeida Portugal, 1st Marquis of Alorna
9. Isabel de Castro
2. João de Almeida Portugal, 2nd Marquis of Alorna
10. Luís de Lencastre, 4th Count of Vila Nova de Portimão
5. Maria José de Lencastre
11. Maria de Távora
1. Leonor de Almeida Portugal, 4th Marquise of Alorna
12. Bernardo de Távora, 2nd Count of Alvor
6. Francisco de Assis de Távora, 3rd Count of Alvor
13. Joana de Lorena
3. Leonor de Lorena e Távora
14. Luís Bernardo de Távora, 5th Count of São João da Pesqueira
7. Leonor Tomásia de Távora, 3rd Marquise of Távora
15. Ana Pereira de Melo de Lorena

=== Issue ===
Name	Portrait	Lifespan	Notes
By Carlos Pedro Maria José Augusto, Count of Oyenhausen-Grevenburg (3 January 1739 – 3 March 1793; married on 15 February 1779)
Leonor Benedita de Almeida e Oyenhausen		30 November 1780 – 18 October 1850	5th Marquise of Alorna, 9th Countess of Assumar, in Portuguese nobility, as the heir and successor of both her mother and brother, and Countess of Oyenhausen-Groewenbourg, in Austrian nobility, as successor of her brother. Secretary of the Household of Maria Francisca Benedita, Dowager Princess of Brazil. Married João José Luís de Mascarenhas Barreto, 6th Marquis of Fronteira, 7th Count of Torre, and 7th Count of Coculim, in 1799.
Juliana Maria Luisa Carolina de Almeida e Oyenhausen		20 August 1782 – 2 November 1864	Married Aires José Maria de Saldanha Albuquerque Coutinho Matos e Noronha, 2nd Count of Ega, in 1800, and later married Count Grigory Alexandrovich Stroganoff, a high-ranking member of Russian nobility. The Countess was famous for her affair with Napoleonic General Jean-Andoche Junot, which granted her power and prestige.
Frederica de Almeida e Oyenhausen		1 September 1784 – 2 October 1847	Never married.
Henriqueta de Almeida e Oyenhausen		3 January 1787 – 20 March 1860	Lady-in-Waiting to Queen Maria II of Portugal. Never married.
Luísa de Almeida e Oyenhausen		1789 – 1817	Married Heliodoro Jacinto Carneiro de Araújo Alvelos, 1st Viscount of Condeixa.
João Carlos Ulrico de Almeida e Oyenhausen		31 October 1791 – 14 August 1822	8th Count of Assumar, in Portuguese nobility, as heir to his mother, and Count of Oyenhausen-Groewenbourg, in Austrian nobility, as the successor of his father. Lieutenant-Colonel of the 4th Royal Cavalry. Commander of the Order of Christ. Never married.

== Bibliography ==
- Lopo de Carvalho, Maria João (2012). Marquesa de Alorna: do Cativeiro de Chelas á Corte de Viena (in Portuguese). Lisbon: Oficina do Livro.
- Horta, Maria Teresa (1999). As Luzes de Leonor (in Portuguese). Lisbon: D. Quixote.
