= Legion of Light Troops =

- Legião de Tropas Ligeiras
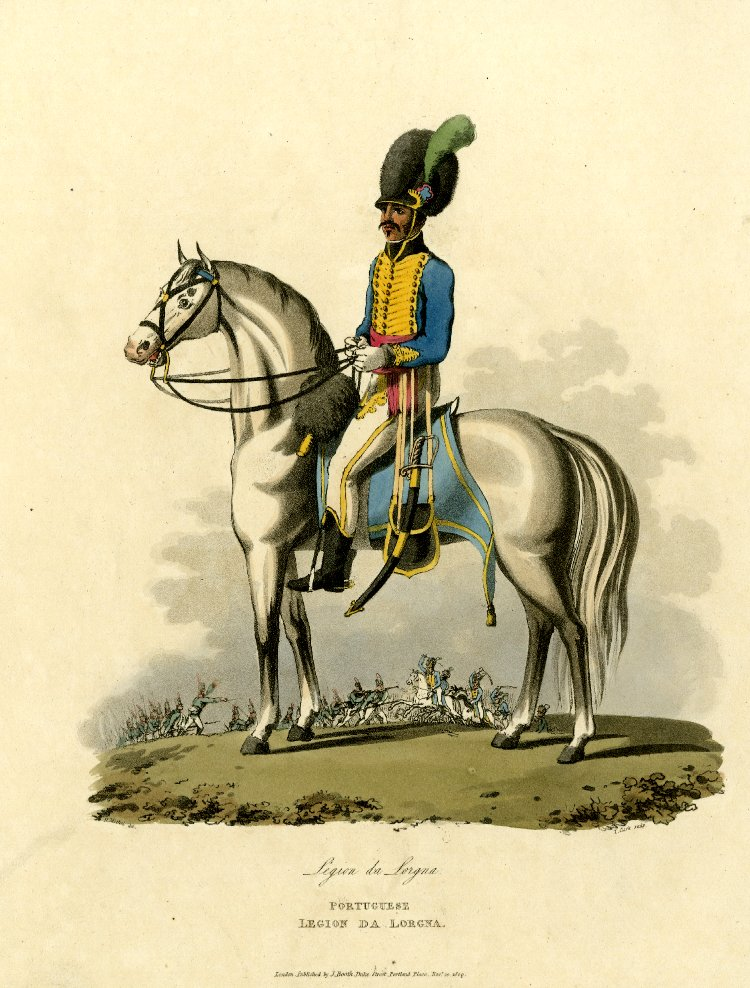
- Active: 1796-1807
- Disbanded: December 1807
- Country: Kingdom of Portugal
- Size: 1339 soldiers
- Nickname: Legion of Alorna
- Engagements: War of the Oranges

Commanders
- Commander: Pedro de Almeida, 3rd Marquis of Alorna

The Legion of Light Troops, also known as the Light Legion or Legion of Alorna, was military unit in the Portuguese Army, created in August 1796.

== History ==
After the War of the Pyrenees, the Portuguese Army created a new all-arms light corps under the command of - General Pedro de Almeida Portugal, 3rd Marquis of Alorna. Entitled the Legion of Light Troops (Legião de Tropas Ligeiras), it consisted of a battalion of eight companies of infantry; three squadrons of cavalry, each having two companies; and a battery of horse artillery armed with four six-pounders, having 56 men and 40 horses. The establishment totalled 1,339 men. Sometimes called the 'Experimental Legion', it was trained according to Alorna's adaptation of French tactical manuals. The experiment, however, remained isolated. The Legion was somewhat resented by the more conservative elements in the army, and was treated as a separate entity; the tactical novelties which it practised and which were being adopted in other armies - largely failed to spread to the rest of the army. Perhaps the only concession that might be ascribed to its avocation of light troops' tactics was the formation of a light infantry company in each infantry regiment. On 7 July 1803 the battery of artillery was incorporated into the Corte Artillery Regiment. The Legion was little affected by the 1806 regulations and remained a very distinct corps. In any event, the French soon marched in and the Legion of Light Troops was disbanded on 22 December 1807. The pro-French Alorna and some of his officers and men formed the Portuguese Legion in French pay.

== Organization ==
- General Staff
- 1 Light Infantry Battalion, consisting of 8 companies
- 3 Cavalry Squadrons, consisting of 6 Hussar companies
- 1 Horse Artillery Battery

== Sources ==
- Chartrand, René; Coelho, Sérgio Veludo (2006). A Infantaria Ligeira na Guerra Peninsular (in Portuguese). Câmara Municipal de Almeida. pp. 35–36. ISBN 972-97982-6-5.
- René, Chartrand; Younghusband, Bill (2000). The Portuguese army of the Napoleonic Wars 1806-15. Oxford: Osprey. p. 3. ISBN 1-85532-981-6.
