= Marquis of Fronteira =

Coat of Arms of the Mascarenhas family, Marquesses of Fronteira and Marquesses of Alorna.

Count of Torre (in Portuguese Conde da Torre) was a Portuguese title of nobility created by a royal decree, dated from July 26, 1638, by King Philip II of Portugal, and granted to Dom Fernando de Mascarenhas, Lord of Rosmaninhal.

The new title of Marquis of Fronteira (in Portuguese Marquês de Fronteira) was granted by a royal decree of King Afonso VI of Portugal, issued on January 7, 1670, to his son Dom João de Mascarenhas, 2nd Count of Torre, to reward his participation in the Portuguese Restoration War.

Later, in the 18th century, the House of Fronteira inherited new honours and estates becoming one of the most powerful families in Portugal:

- Count of Coculim – inherited by the House of Fronteira, when a younger branch of the Mascarenhas family became extinct (1792);
- House of Alorna (Marquis of Alorna and Count of Assumar) – inherited by the House of Fronteira when João José Luis Mascarenhas Barreto, 6th Marquis of Fronteira, married Leonor Benedita Maria de Oyenhausen de Almeida, 5th Marchioness of Alorna (1799).

The current Marquis also represents the House of Távora, already extinct.

== List of counts of Torre (1638) and marquesses of Fronteira (1670) ==
- Fernando de Mascarenhas (1610–1651), 1st Count of Torre;
- João de Mascarenhas (1633–1681), his son, 2nd Count of Torre and 1st Marquis of Fronteira;
- Fernando de Mascarenhas (1655–1729), his son, 2nd Marquis of Fronteira and 3rd Count of Torre;
- João Mascarenhas (1679–1737), his son, 3rd Marquis of Fronteira and 4th Count of Torre;
- Fernando José Mascarenhas (1717–1765), his son, 4th Marquis of Fronteira and 5th Count of Torre;
- José Luis Mascarenhas (1721–1799), his younger brother, 5th Marquis of Fronteira and 6th Count of Torre;
- João José Luis Mascarenhas Barreto (1778–1806), 6th Marquis of Alorna, 7th Count of Torre and 7th Count of Coculim. Married to Leonor Benedita Maria de Oyenhausen de Almeida (1776–1850), 5th Marchioness of Alorna and 9th Countess of Assumar, uniting the Houses of Fronteira and Alorna;
- José Trazimundo Mascarenhas Barreto (1802–1881), 7th Marquis of Fronteira, 8th Count of Torre, 10th Count of Assumar and 8th Count of Coculim;
- Maria Mascarenhas Barreto (1822–1914), his daughter, 8th Marchioness of Fronteira, 6th Marchioness of Alorna and 9th Countess of Torre;
- José Maria Mascarenhas (1856–1930), her cousin, 9th Marquis of Fronteira, 7th Marquis of Alorna, 10th Count of Torre and 11th Count of Assumar;
- José Maria Mascarenhas (1882–1944), his son, 10th Marquis of Fronteira, 8th Marquis of Alorna, 11th Count of Torre, 12th Count of Assumar, 11th Count of Coculin;
- Fernando de Mascarenhas (1910–1956), his son, 11th Marquis of Fronteira, 9th Marquis of Alorna, 12th Count of Torre, 13th Count of Assumar, 12th Count of Coculim;
- Fernando José Fernandes Costa Mascarenhas (1945–2014), his son, 12th Marquis of Fronteira, 10th Marquis of Alorna, 13th Count of Torre, 14th Count of Assumar, 13th Count of Coculim; no issue.
- António Maria Infante da Câmara Mascarenhas (b. 1985), his nephew, 13th Marquis of Fronteira, 11th Marquis of Alorna, 14th Count of Torre, 15th Count of Assumar, 14th Count of Coculim.

== See also ==
- List of marquisates in Portugal
- Marquis of Alorna
- Count of Coculim

== Estates ==
- Palace of the Marquesses of Fronteira

== Bibliography ==
”Nobreza de Portugal e do Brasil" – Vol. II, pages 623/628, and Vol. III pages 441/442. Published by Zairol Lda., Lisbon 1989.
