= Domenico Pellegrini (painter) =

Italian painter

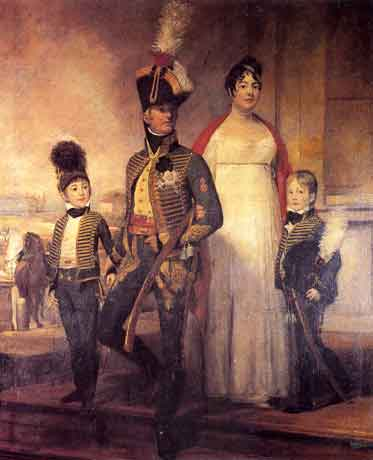
Family portrait of Pedro de Almeida Portugal, 3rd Marquis of Alorna

Domenico Pellegrini (1759 – 1840) was an Italian painter.

== Biography ==
He was born in Galliera Veneta and became the pupil of Lodovico Gallina. He was active in Venice, Rome, London, Paris, Lisbon, and Naples and is known for portraits and historical allegories. He died in Rome.

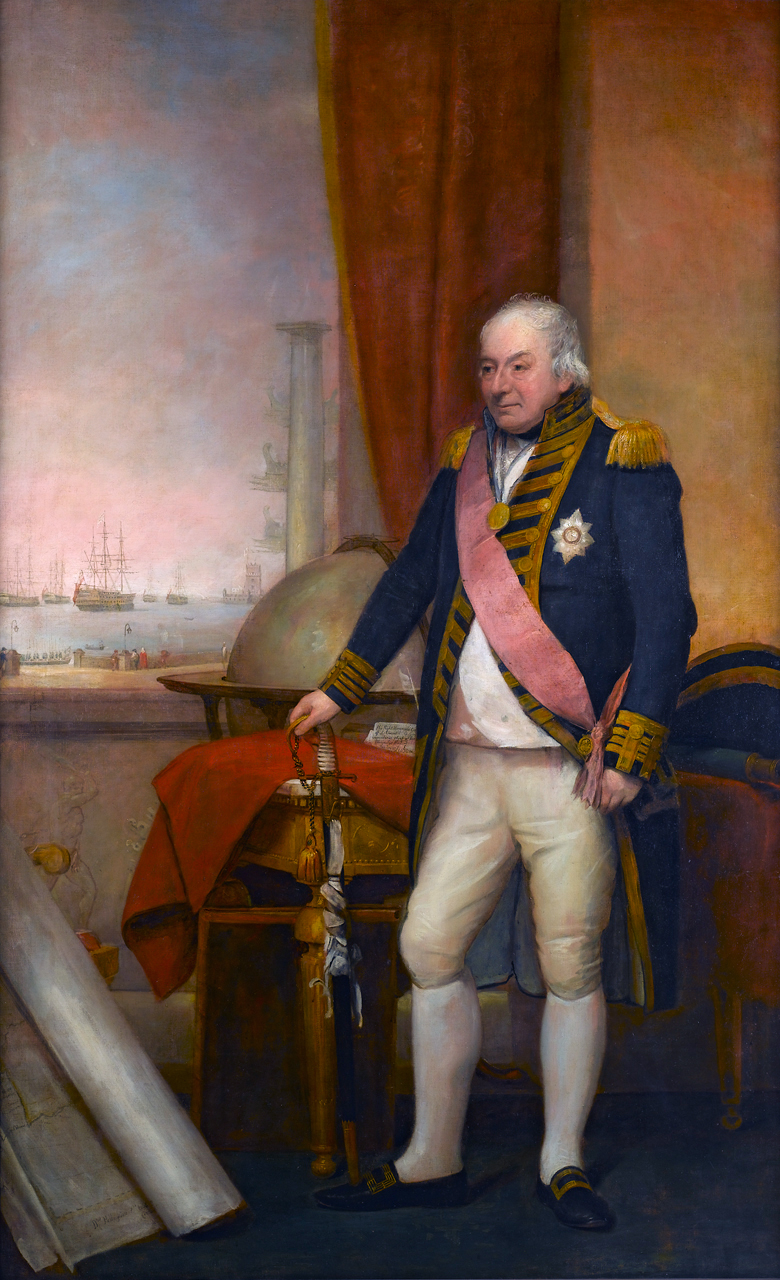
John Jervis

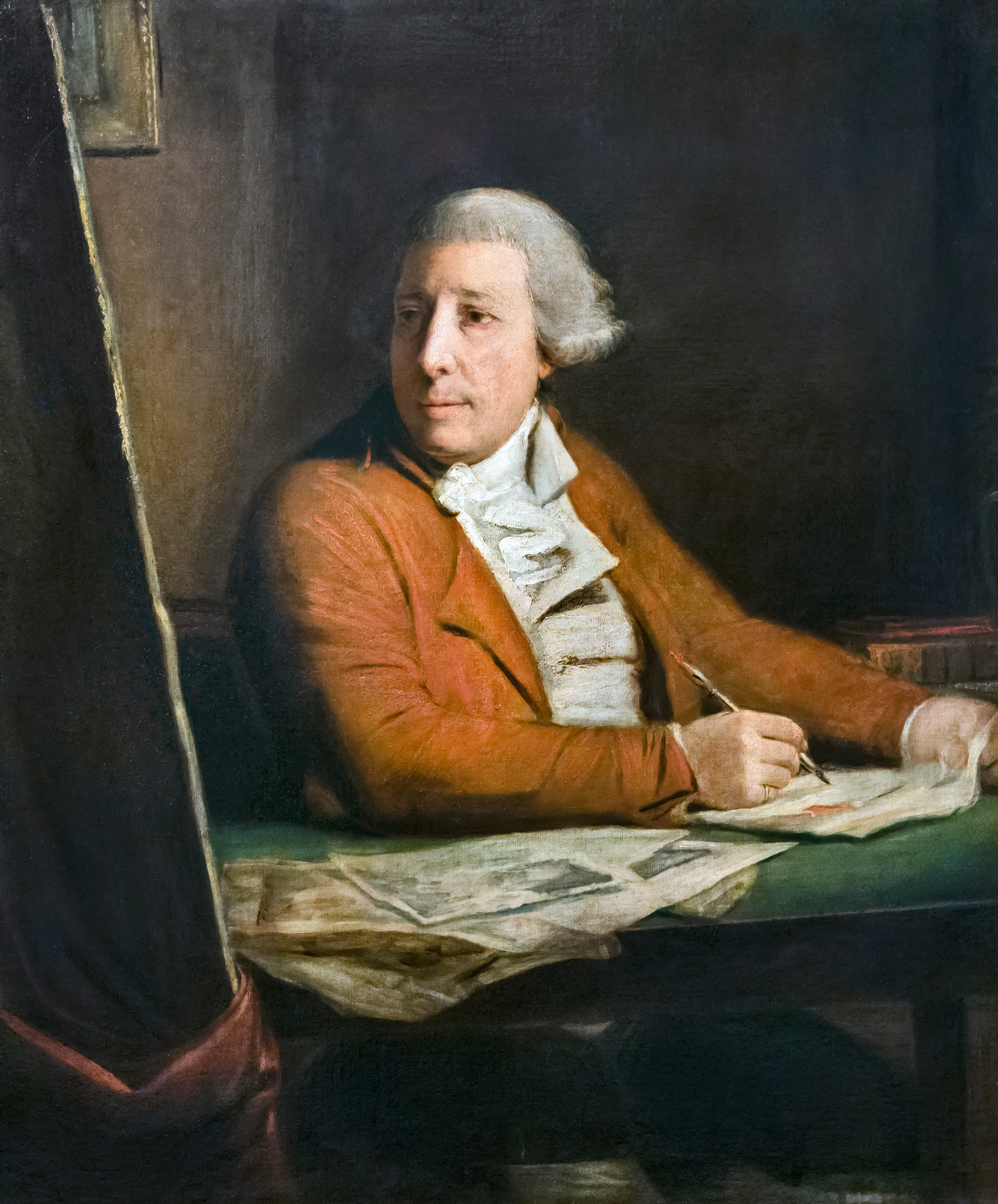
Francesco Bartolozzi

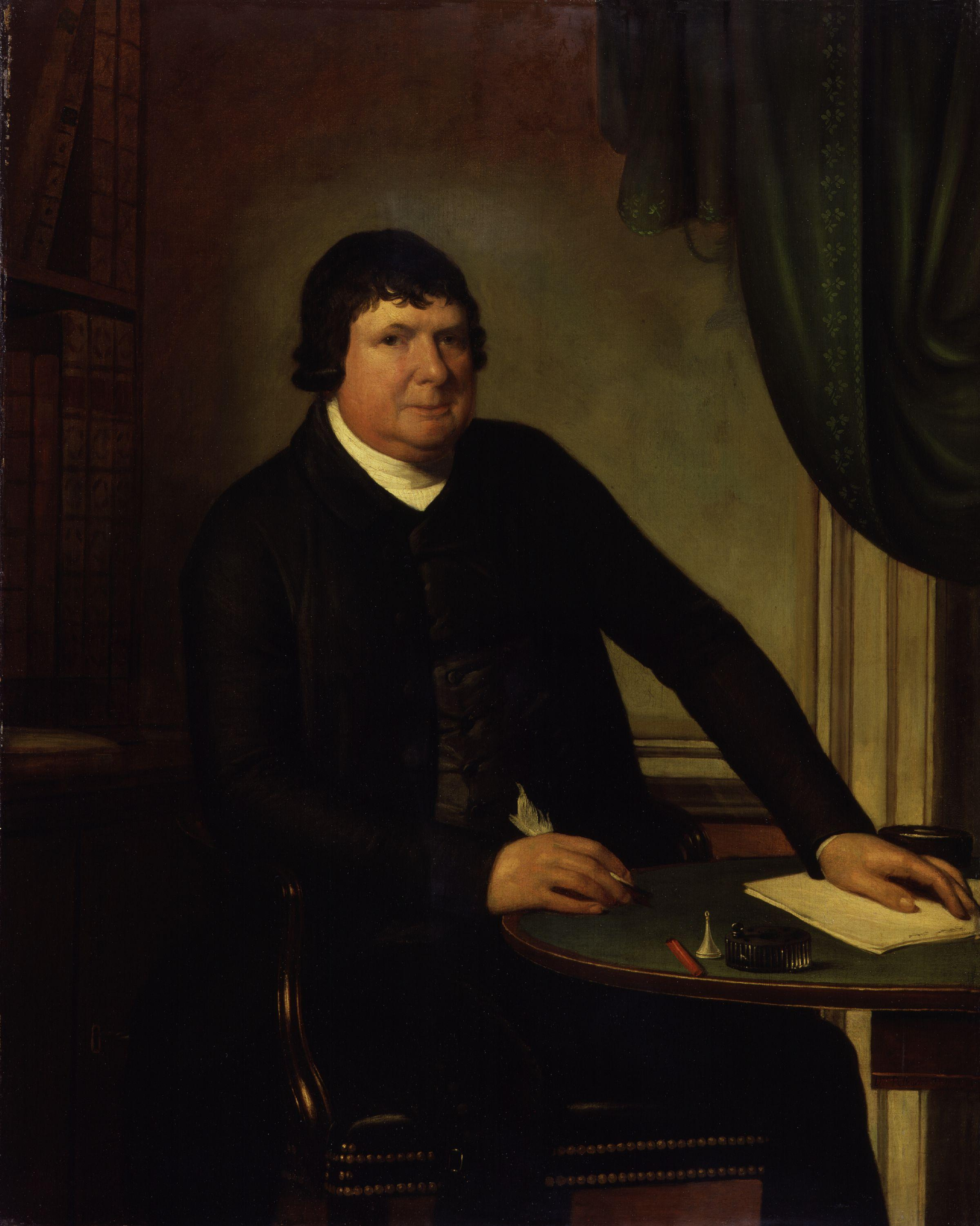
William Huntington

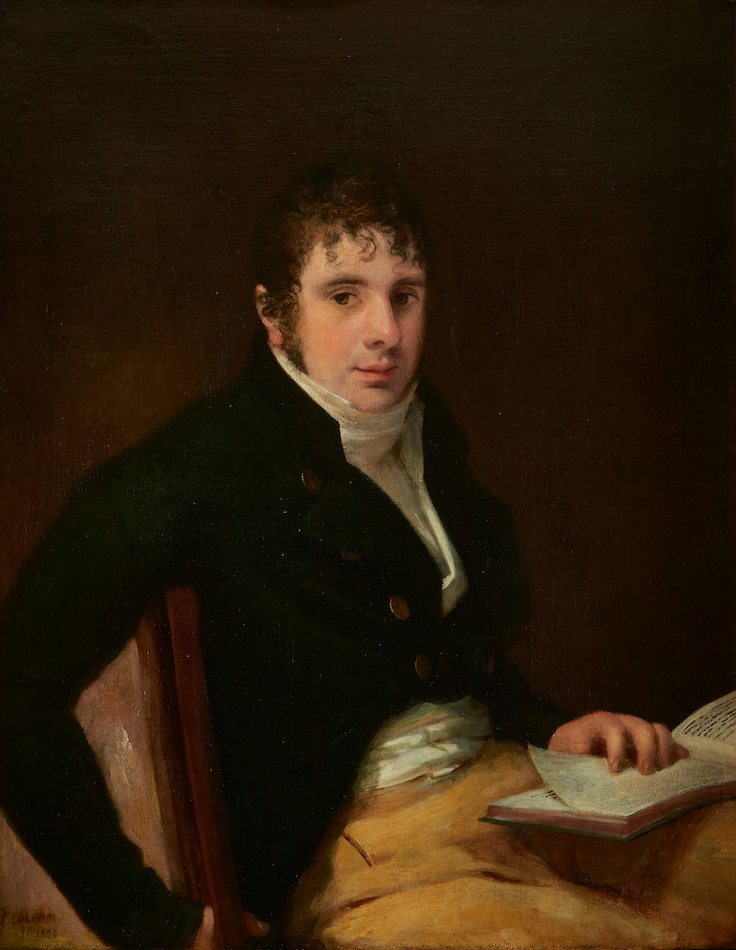
The Count of Carvalhal

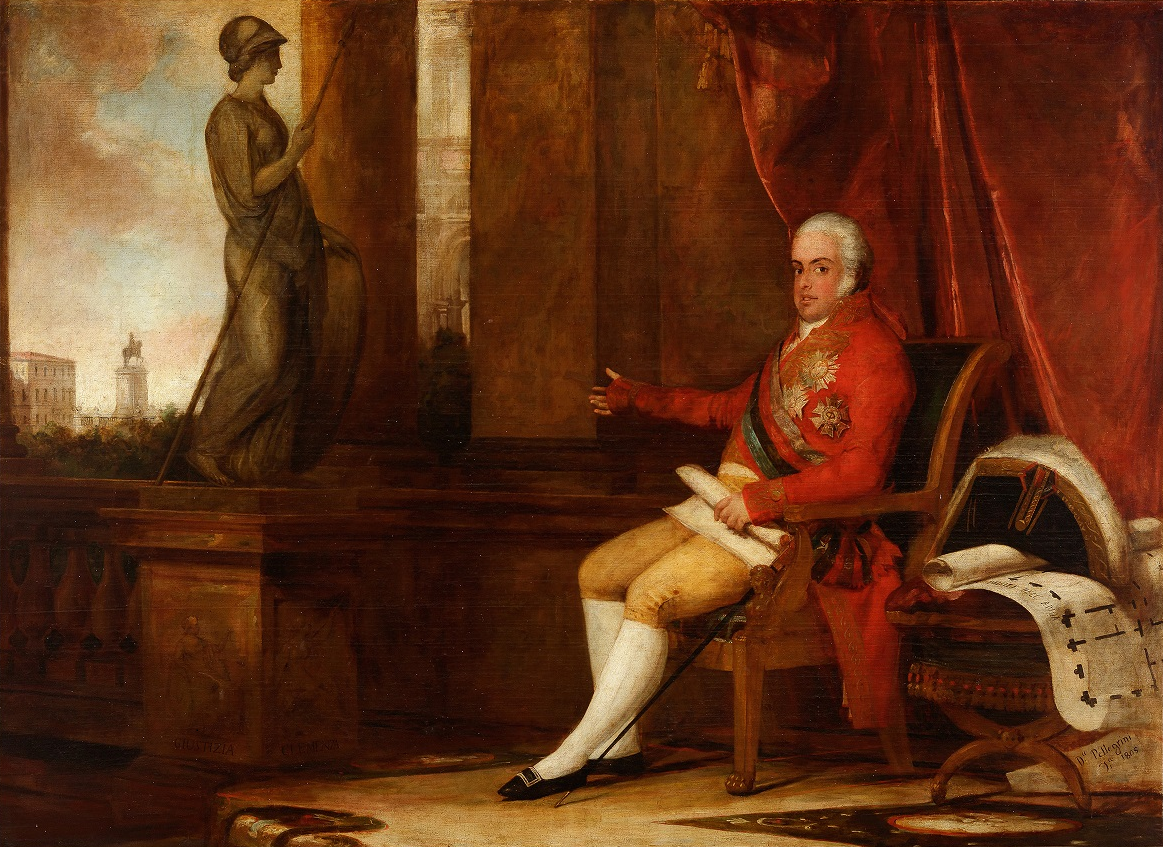
John, Prince Regent of Portugal
