= Laure Junot, Duchess of Abrantès =

French writer and memoirist (1784–1838)

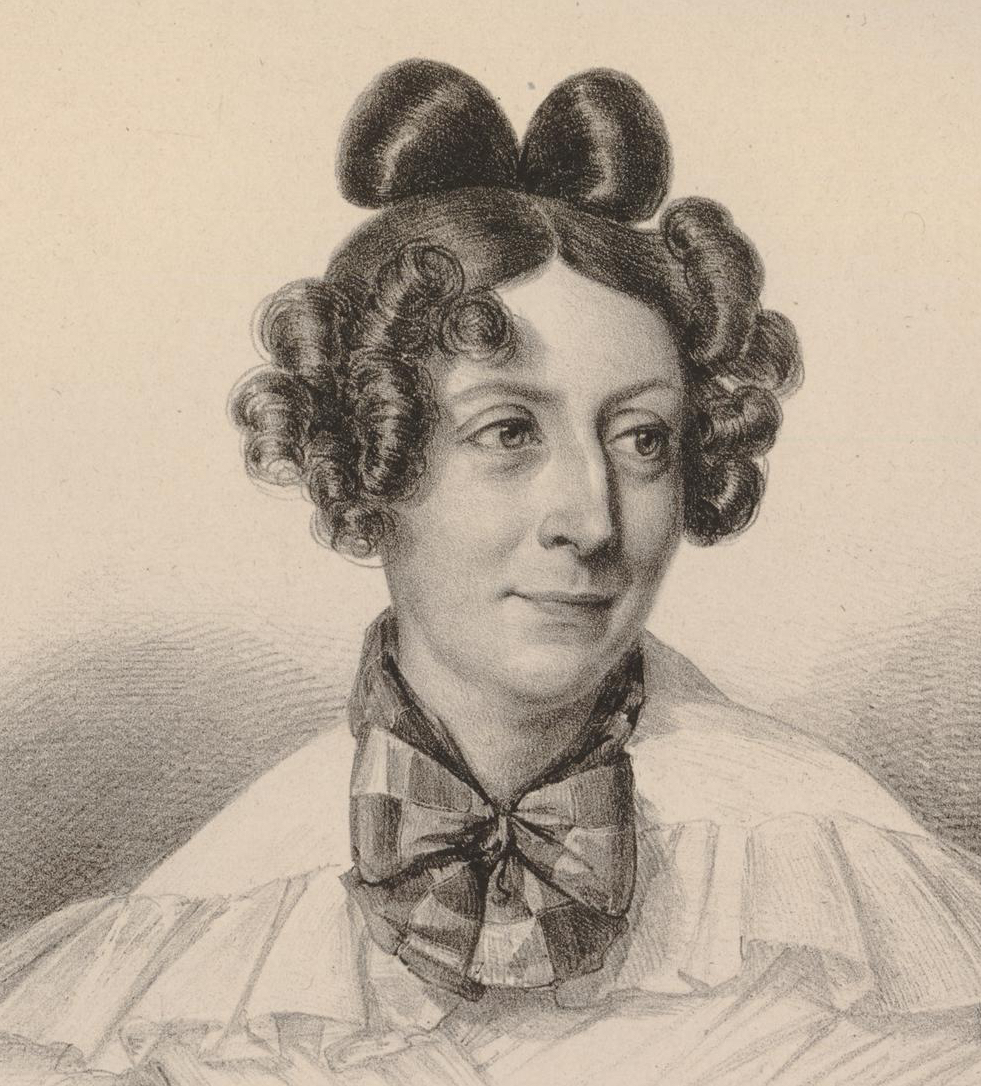
- Born: Laure Adélaïde Constance Permon; 6 November 1784; Montpellier, France
- Died: 7 June 1838 (aged 53); Paris, France
- Spouse(s): Jean-Andoche Junot; Marie Louise Léonie Lepic
- Writing career
- Genre: memoir

Signature
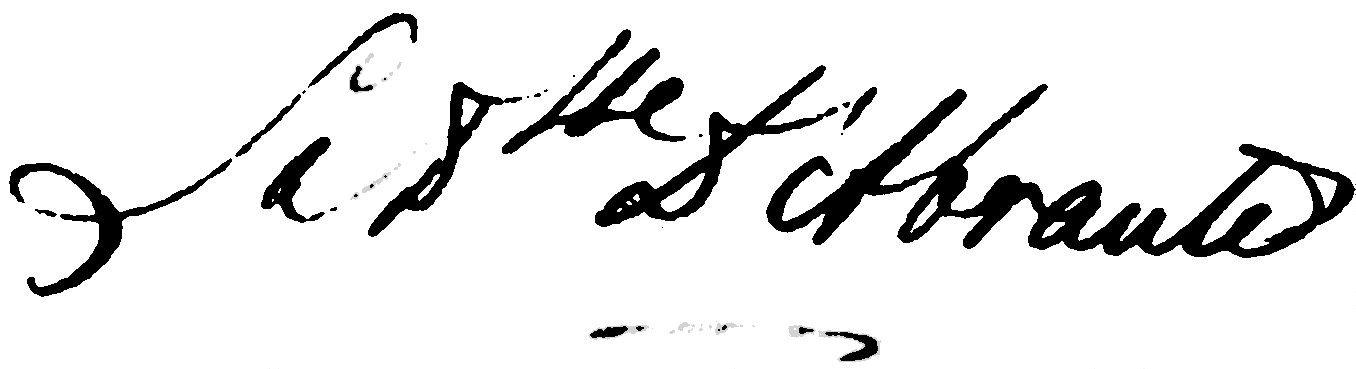

Laure Junot, Duchess of Abrantès, née Permon (French: [loʁ ʒyno]; 6 November 1784 – 7 June 1838) was a French writer, most famous for her memoirs. She was the wife of French general Jean-Andoche Junot.

== Biography ==
Laure was born as Laure Adélaïde Constance Permon at Montpellier, the daughter of Charles Martin de Permon, and his wife Laure Marie "Panoria" Stefanopoli (or Stephanopoli de Comnène), to whom during her widowhood the young Napoleon Bonaparte made an offer of marriage. Her mother, Panoria, claimed to be descended from the Comnene family, the last Greek dynasty from the Empire of Trebizond. The Martin de Permon family, after various vicissitudes, settled at Paris, and Bonaparte certainly frequented their house a good deal after the downfall of the Jacobin party in Thermidor 1794.

In 1800, Laure married Jean-Andoche Junot, a close friend of Napoleon's (created Duke of Abrantès in 1806). They had four children. This was early in the Consulate and she at once entered eagerly into all the gaieties of Paris, and became noted for her beauty, her caustic wit, and her extravagance. The First Consul nicknamed her petite peste, but treated her and Junot with generosity. During Junot's diplomatic mission to Lisbon, his wife so displayed her prodigality, that on his return to Paris in 1806 he was burdened with debts, which his own intrigues did not lessen. She joined him again at Lisbon after he had entered that city as conqueror at the close of 1807; but even the presents and spoils won at Lisbon did not satisfy her demands; she accompanied Junot through part of the Peninsular War.

On her return to France she displeased the emperor by her vivacious remarks and by receiving guests whom he disliked. On 29 July 1813 her husband committed suicide, leaving Laure heartbroken and with little money. She did not side with Napoleon during the Hundred Days. After 1815 she spent most of her time at Rome amidst artistic society, which she enlivened with her sprightly converse; a monarchist on her return to Paris during the Restoration, she compiled her famous Memoirs with the encouragement of Balzac, her lover since 1828.

Ridiculed by Gautier as the "Duchess of Abracadantès" and fallen into poverty, she died in a nursing home in Paris in 1838.

== Works ==
The Memoirs were published at Paris in 1831–1834 in 18 volumes. Many editions have since appeared.

Of her other books the most noteworthy are Histoires contemporaines (2 vols., 1835); Scènes de la vie espagnole (2 vols., 1836); Histoire des salons de Paris (6 vols., 1837–1838); Souvenirs d'une ambassade et d'un séjour en Espagne et en Portugal, de 1808 à 1811 (2 vols., 1837).
