= Juliana de Almeida e Oyenhausen =

Portuguese noble and lady in waiting

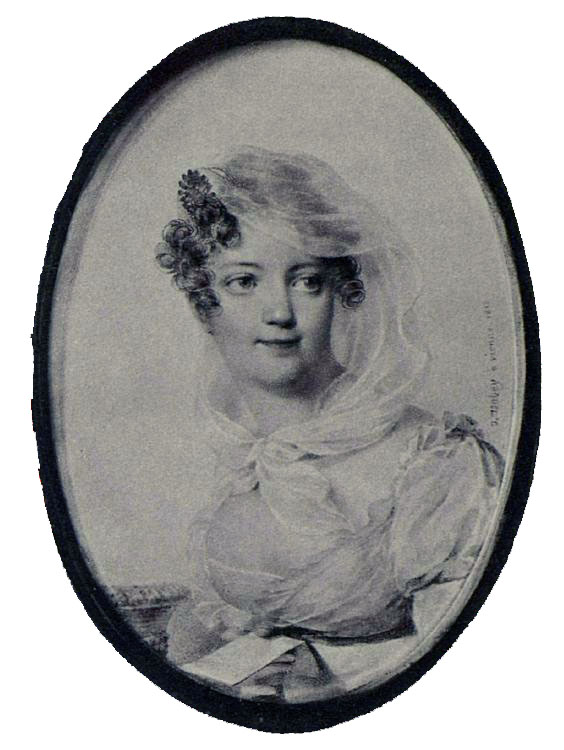
- Julia Stroganova in 1818
- Born: Juliana Luisa Maria de Almeida e Oyenhausen; August 20, 1782
- Died: November 2, 1864 (aged 82)
- Other name: Julia Stroganova
- Spouse(s): Aires José Maria de Saldanha Albuquerque Coutinho Matos e Noronha, 2nd Count of Ega (married 1800–?); Grigory Alexandrovich, count of Stroganov
- Parents: Carlos Pedro Maria José Augusto, count of Oyenhausen-Gravenburg (father); Leonor de Almeida Portugal, Marquise of Alorna (mother)

Juliana Luisa Maria de Almeida e Oyenhausen, also known as Julia Stroganova (20 August 1782 – 2 November 1864), was a Portuguese noble and lady in waiting. Born to Leonor de Almeida Portugal, Marquise of Alorna and Carlos Pedro Maria José Augusto, count of Oyenhausen-Gravenburg, she was the official mistress of Jean-Andoche Junot, the regent of French-occupied Portugal in 1807–1808, and exerted political influence during her position as such.

She married Aires José Maria de Saldanha Albuquerque Coutinho Matos e Noronha, 2nd Count of Ega in 1800, and later married Count Grigory Alexandrovich Stroganov, a high-ranking member of Russian nobility.

== Ancestry ==
Ancestors of Juliana de Almeida e Oyenhausen

16. Rabe Arndt, Lord of Oyenhausen
8. Rabe Christoph, Count of Oyenhausen
17. Elizabeth Anna von Hardenberg
4. Friedrich Ulrich, Count of Oyenhausen-Grevenburg
18. Gustav Adolf von der Schulenburg
9. Sophia Juliane von der Schulenburg
19. Petronella Ottilia von Schwencken
2. Carlos Pedro Maria José Augusto, Count of Oyenhausen-Grevenburg
20. Philippe, Chevalier de Lorraine
10. Alexandre of Lorraine, Chevalier de Beauvernois
21. Claude de Souches
5. Baroness Frédérique Guillaumine of Lorraine
22. Jobst Moritz, Baron von Uffeln
11. Baroness Eva Antoinette von Uffeln
23. Anna Sabina von Schilder
1. Juliana de Almeida e Oyenhausen
24. João de Almeida Portugal, 2nd Count of Assumar
12. Pedro Miguel de Almeida Portugal, 1st Marquis of Alorna
25. Isabel de Castro
6. João de Almeida Portugal, 2nd Marquis of Alorna
26. Luís de Lencastre, 4th Count of Vila Nova de Portimão
13. Maria José de Lencastre
27. Maria de Távora
3. Leonor de Almeida Portugal, 4th Marquise of Alorna
28. Bernardo de Távora, 2nd Count of Alvor
14. Francisco de Assis de Távora, 3rd Count of Alvor
29. Joana de Lorena
7. Leonor de Lorena e Távora
30. Luís Bernardo de Távora, 5th Count of São João da Pesqueira
15. Leonor Tomásia de Távora, 3rd Marquise of Távora
31. Ana de Lorena
