= Pedro de Almeida Portugal, 3rd Marquis of Alorna =

Portuguese general (1754–1813)

Pedro de Almeida Portugal Marquis of Alorna Count of Assumar
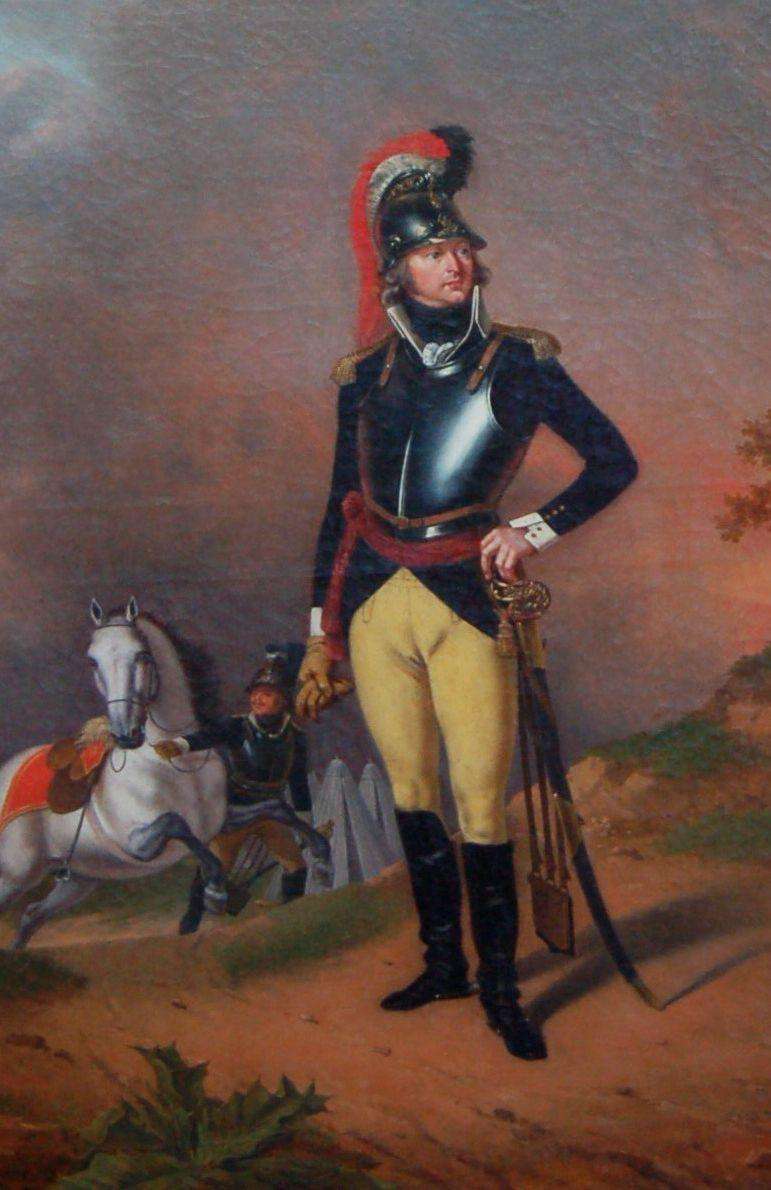
- Portrait attributed to Domenico Pellegrini
- Born: 16 January 1754; Lisbon, Kingdom of Portugal
- Died: 2 January 1813 (aged 58); Königsberg, Kingdom of Prussia
- Other name: Pedro José de Almeida Portugal de Lorena e Lencastre
- Spouse: Henriqueta Julia Gabriela de Lorena Távora e Cunha
- Military career
- Allegiance: Kingdom of Portugal; First French Empire
- Rank: General of Division
- Conflicts: Napoleonic Wars

D. Pedro de Almeida Portugal, 3rd Marquis of Alorna (16 January 1754 – 2 January 1813) was a Portuguese general who served in the French Army during the Napoleonic Wars.

== Military career ==
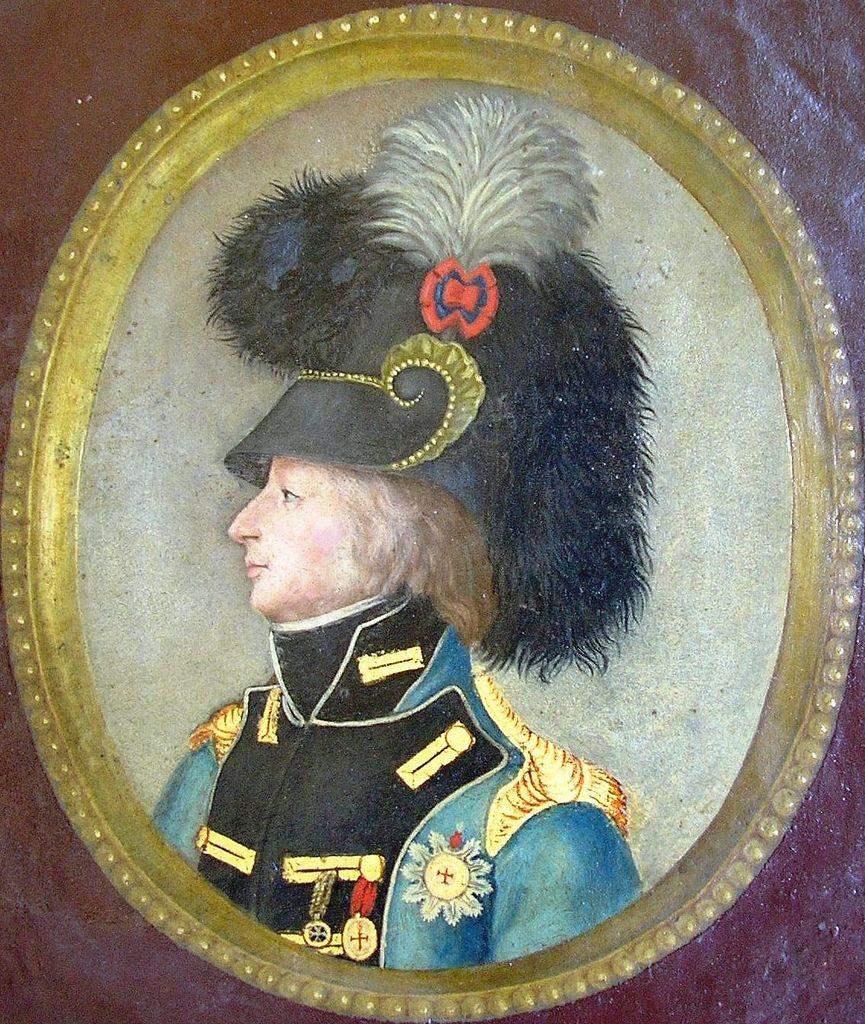
Marquis of Alorna c. 1800.

In November 1793, Almeida was an adjutant general. He commanded Portuguese forces in Spain, fighting against the French. In 1798, he became the commander of a unit of light troops known as the Alorna Legion. Almeida was promoted to major general in 1799. He began conspiring with the French, and helped force the Portuguese court to flee to Brazil in 1807. He was promoted to lieutenant general in October of that year, and charged with the defense of Elvas. However, under the orders of the prince regent, he was forced to surrender Elvas to the Spanish on 2 December 1807.

Almeida was governor of the Alentejo province until 22 December 1807, when Jean-Andoche Junot, the invading French general, made him inspector general and commander of all Portuguese forces stationed in the provinces of Beira, Trás-os-Montes, and Estremadura. On 15 February 1808 he was named inspector general of all Portuguese forces, and commanded them in Spain from March to June 1808. On 1 August 1808 he was named a major general in the service of Napoleonic Spain. On 22 April 1810 Almeida was assigned to the staff of André Masséna, and played an important role in the Siege of Almeida.

He entered France in July 1811 and was assigned to the Observation Corps of the Grande Armée on 30 January 1812. Named major general in the service of France on 21 March 1812, Almeida was put in charge of the 2nd company of Portuguese chasseur. He was then made commander of the Portuguese light cavalry regiment. He participated in the retreat from Russia and died during it in Königsberg.

He was succeeded by his sister, Leonor de Almeida Portugal, 4th Marquise of Alorna.

== Marriage and descendants ==
Almeida married Henriqueta Julia Gabriela da Cunha (1787-1829), eldest daughter of the Count of São Vicente, on 19 February 1782 in Lisbon. The couple had two children who predeceased them :

- João de Almeida Portugal (1786–1805), 6th Count of Assumar, died from a fall from his horse
- Miguel de Almeida Portugal (1787–1806), 7th Count of Assumar, drowned in a watertank.
