= Duke of Abrantès =

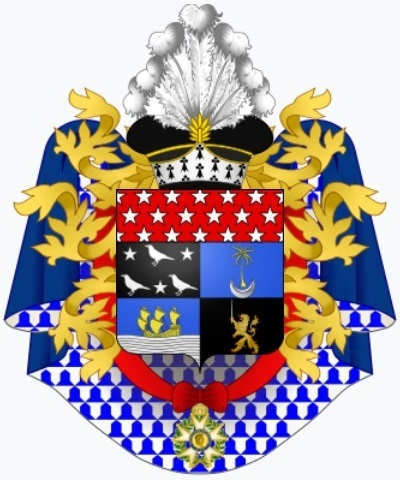
Heraldic achievement of the 1st Duke of Abrantès

The title of Duke of Abrantès was a title of Napoleonic nobility created in 1808 by Napoleon for Jean-Andoche Junot.

After the King of Portugal's refusal to join the Continental Blockade, Napoleon I despatched General Jean-Andoche Junot in command of the French invasion of Portugal. General Junot marched through Portugal and set up camp at the city of Abrantes, before advancing on Lisbon.

After the French victory, Napoleon conferred the victory title of Duke of Abrantès (French: Duc d'Abrantès) upon General Junot. His wife was the French writer Laure née Martin de Permont, and she became styled as the Duchess of Abrantès.

The dukedom, extinct since 1982 upon the death of Maurice Le Ray, 6th Duke of Abrantès, was never formally recognized by the Portuguese government.

== See also ==
- French nobility
- Duke of Abrantes

== Bibliography ==
- Chartrand, René. Vimeiro 1808. London: Osprey Publishing, 2001. ISBN 1-84176-309-8
- Haythornthwaite, Philip. Napoleon's Commanders (1) c. 1792–1809. London: Osprey Publishing, 2001. ISBN 1-84176-055-2
