= Marquis of Alorna =

Coat of Arms of the Almeida Portugal family, Counts of Assumar (1630) and Marquesses of Alorna (1748).

Marquis of Alorna was a Portuguese title of nobility granted, on 9 November 1748, by King John V of Portugal, to D. Pedro Miguel de Almeida Portugal e Vasconcelos, 3rd Count of Assumar and 44th viceroy of India.

Originally, on 24 March 1744, the title was granted to him as Marquis of Castelo Novo but, due to his victories in India, it was changed, in 1748, to Marquis of Alorna, a town in Portuguese India.

The House of Alorna was later inherited by the Marquesses of Fronteira, once the last Marchioness of this line, Leonor Benedita Maria de Oyenhausen de Almeida (1776–1850), married João José Luis Mascarenhas Barreto (1778–1806), 6th Marquis of Fronteira.

== List of marquesses of Alorna ==
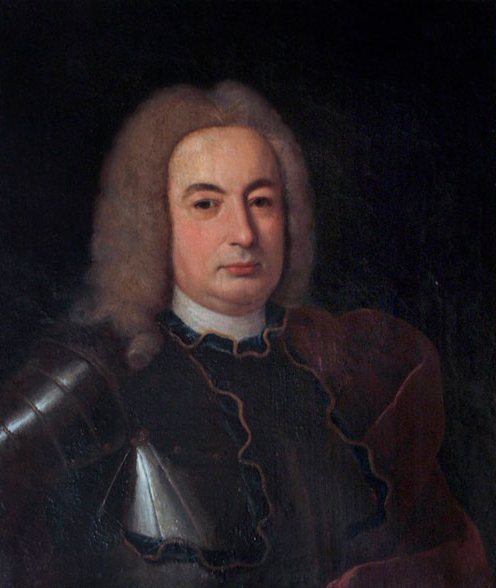
D. Pedro Miguel de Almeida Portugal, 1st Marquis of Alorna

1. Pedro Miguel de Almeida Portugal e Vasconcelos (1688–1756), also 3rd Count of Assumar and 1st Marquis of Castelo Novo;
2. João de Almeida Portugal (1726–1802), his son, 4th Count of Assumar
3. Pedro José de Almeida Portugal(1754–1813), his son, 5th Count of Assumar
4. Leonor de Almeida Portugal, 4th Marquise of Alorna, his sister, known as Alcipe (1750–1839), 8th Countess of Assumar. Married to Karl, Count of Oyenhausen-Gravenburg;
5. Leonor Benedita Maria de Oyenhausen de Almeida (1776–1850), their daughter, 9th Countess of Assumar and Countess of Oyenhausen (in Austria). Married, on 10 November 1799, to João José Luis Mascarenhas Barreto (1778–1806), 6th Marquis of Fronteira.

For the following marquesses see Marquis of Fronteira

== See also ==
- List of marquisates in Portugal
- Count of Assumar

== Bibliography ==
”Nobreza de Portugal e do Brasil" – Vol. II, pages 250/257 and page 509. Published by Zairol Lda., Lisbon 1989.
