= José Trasimundo Mascarenhas Barreto, 7th Marquis of Fronteira =

Portuguese nobleman and politician

José Mascarenhas Barreto
- Marquis of Fronteira, Count of Coculim
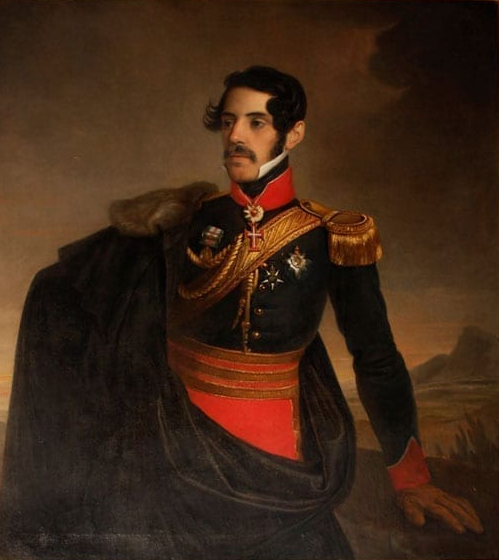

Marquis of Fronteira
- Full name: José Trasimundo Mascarenhas Barreto
- Born: 11 January 1802; Lisbon, Kingdom of Portugal
- Died: 19 February 1881 (aged 79)
- Noble family: Mascarenhas Barreto
- Spouse: Maria Constança da Câmara
- Father: João José Luís de Mascarenhas Barreto, 6th Marquis of Fronteira
- Mother: Leonor Benedita de Oyenhausen de Almeida

José Trasimundo Mascarenhas Barreto, 7th Marquis of Fronteira (Lisbon; 11 January 1802 — 19 February 1881); was a Portuguese nobleman and politician.

== Life ==
José Trasimundo Mascarenhas Barreto was born in Lisbon on 11 January 1802 to João José Luís de Mascarenhas Barreto, 6th Marquis of Fronteira, and Leonor Benedita de Almeida e Almeida, daughter of Leonor de Almeida Portugal, 4th Marquise of Alorna.

He married on February 14, 1821 Maria Constança da Câmara, Lady of the Order of Saint Isabel, and maid of honour of Queen Maria II of Portugal.

He had only one daughter, D. Maria Mascarenhas Barreto, who became his heiress. Born on 27 May 1823, she married Pedro João de Morais Sarmento, 2nd Baron of Torre de Moncorvo, who was raised by this marriage to the rank of Count of Torre and later Marquis of Fronteira.

He fought in the Liberal Wars (1828-1834) and became Governor of the Lisbon District (1846 and 1848-1851), which he defended during the Little Civil War of 1846-47 and the military insurrection of 1 May 1851. After this insurrection, he did not wish to remain in active service, and requested and obtained retirement with the rank of Mmarechal de campo.

Upon the marriage of King Pedro V in May 1858, he was appointed Mordomo-mor (Chief Steward) of the Household of Queen Stephanie, a position he held until her untimely death in July 1859. When King Pedro V and the Infante João died in 1861, the Duke of Saldanha, then the Chief Steward of the Royal Household, fell ill, and the Marquis of Fronteira stepped in to fill that high office. At the time of King Luís I’s marriage in 1862, he was appointed Chief Steward of the Household of Queen Maria Pia. A few years later, for personal reasons, he resigned, and his resignation was accepted.
