= Jean-Andoche Junot =

French general (1771–1813)

Jean-Andoche Junot Duke of Abrantès
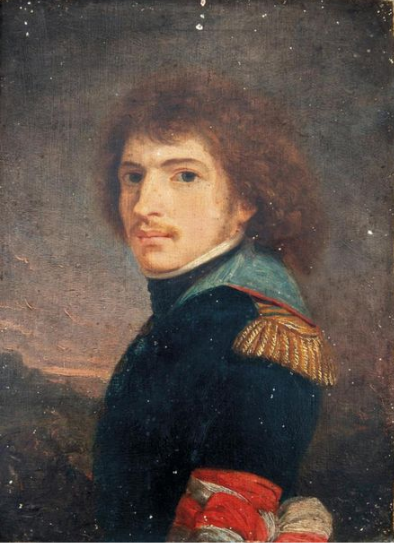
- Portrait c. 1797

Military Governor of Paris
- In office 1803–1804
- Monarch: Napoleon I
- Preceded by: Édouard Mortier
- Succeeded by: Joachim Murat
- In office 1806–1807
- Preceded by: Joachim Murat
- Succeeded by: Pierre-Augustin Hulin

Personal details
- Born: 25 September 1771 Bussy-le-Grand, Burgundy, Kingdom of France
- Died: 29 July 1813 (aged 41) Montbard, Côte-d'Or, French Empire
- Nickname: La Tempête (“The Tempest”)

Military service
- Allegiance: Kingdom of France; First French Republic; First French Empire
- Branch/service: Army
- Years of service: 1791–1813
- Rank: General of division
- Commands: Army of Portugal; III Corps; VIII Corps
- Battles/wars: See list: French Revolutionary Wars; War of the First Coalition; Siege of Toulon; War of the Second Coalition; Battle of Lonato; War of the Third Coalition; Battle of Austerlitz; Napoleonic Wars; Peninsular War; Invasion of Portugal (1807); Battle of Vimeiro; Siege of Astorga; Battle of Sobral; War of the Fifth Coalition; Battle of Gefrees; French invasion of Russia; Battle of Smolensk; Battle of Valutino (Note: (responsibility for the result)); Battle of Borodino

Jean-Andoche Junot, Duke of Abrantès (English: /ʒuːˈnoʊ/ zhoo-NOH, French: [ʒɑ̃.n‿ɑ̃dɔʃ ʒyno]; 25 September 1771 – 29 July 1813) was a French military officer who served in the French Revolutionary Wars and the Napoleonic Wars. He is best known for leading the French invasion of Portugal in 1807.

== Early life and education ==
Junot was born into a bourgeois family in Bussy-le-Grand, Burgundy, on 25 September 1771. He was the fifth son of Michel Junot (1739–1814) and Marie Antoinette Bienaymé (1735–1806). He first attended school in Montbard, then in Châtillon, where he befriended Auguste de Marmont, then studied law in Dijon. At the start of the French Revolution, he was working as a law clerk in Chaumont. Junot embraced the revolutionary cause, and was present at the Fête de la Fédération in Paris on 14 July 1790.

== Early career ==
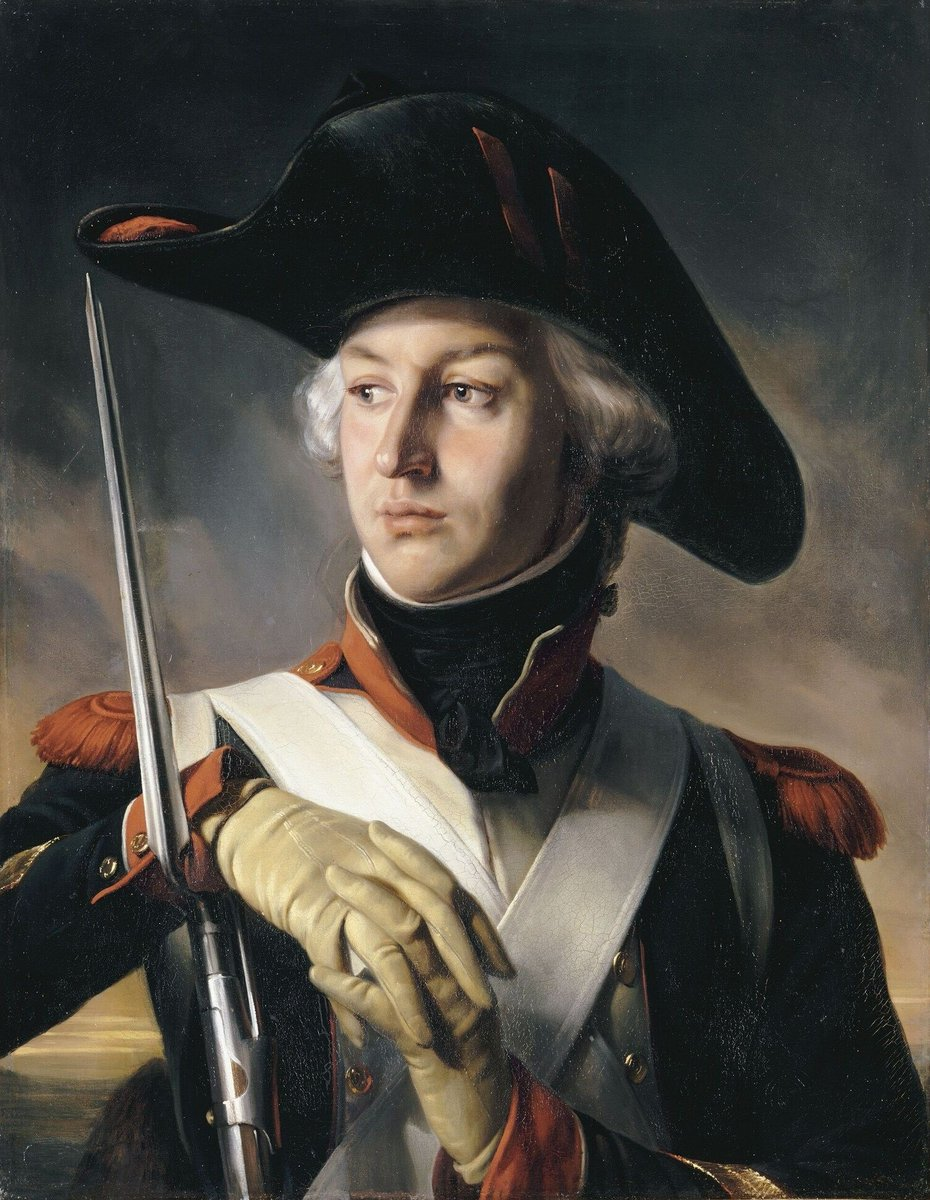
Junot as a sergeant of the grenadiers of the 2nd Côte-d'Or Battalion in 1792, by Félix Philippoteaux (1834)

On 9 July 1791, Junot was one of the founding members of his hometown's National Guard, serving as captain of its 1st company. Later that year he enlisted as a grenadier in the 2nd Battalion of Volunteers of Côte-d'Or. At the start of the War of the First Coalition, Junot was sent to the Army of the North, receiving the first of many battle wounds at La Glisuelle on 11 June 1792. He was soon promoted to sergeant, and was again injured on 16 May 1793 while serving in the Army of the Rhine. During this time, Junot's comrades gave him the nickname "the Tempest" (la Tempête).

Junot first met then-captain Napoleon Bonaparte at the Siege of Toulon, in late 1793: Bonaparte required a man with good handwriting to write a letter for him, which Junot volunteered to do, and made a lasting impression with his witty jokes after being narrowly missed by a cannonball. After the siege, Bonaparte was made a general and Junot joined him as his aide-de-camp. However, due to his connections to Augustin Robespierre, Bonaparte lost his position and was briefly placed under house arrest. Junot and Auguste de Marmont offered to break him out, which the general declined, but went to them for assistance after his release. Junot, Marmont and Bonaparte, all temporarily unemployed, lived together in a rented room in Paris. In 1795 Junot participated in the suppression of the Royalist revolt of 13 Vendémiaire under Bonaparte, then followed him to the Army of Italy. Junot served in the Montenotte campaign of April 1796, distinguishing himself at the Battle of Millesimo, for which he received the rank of colonel and the honor of delivering to the Directory the first standards captured in the Italian campaigns. He again distinguished himself at the Battle of Lonato, where he killed six enemy soldiers in hand-to-hand fighting and suffered three sabre cuts to the head.

== Egyptian campaign ==
Junot was one of the first to be informed of Bonaparte's planned expedition to Egypt. In May 1798, he left for Egypt along with Bonaparte aboard the expedition's flagship, l'Orient, and took part in the capture of Malta. Junot fought at the Battle of the Pyramids on 21 July 1798, as a chef de brigade, and was promoted to brigade general on 9 January 1799.

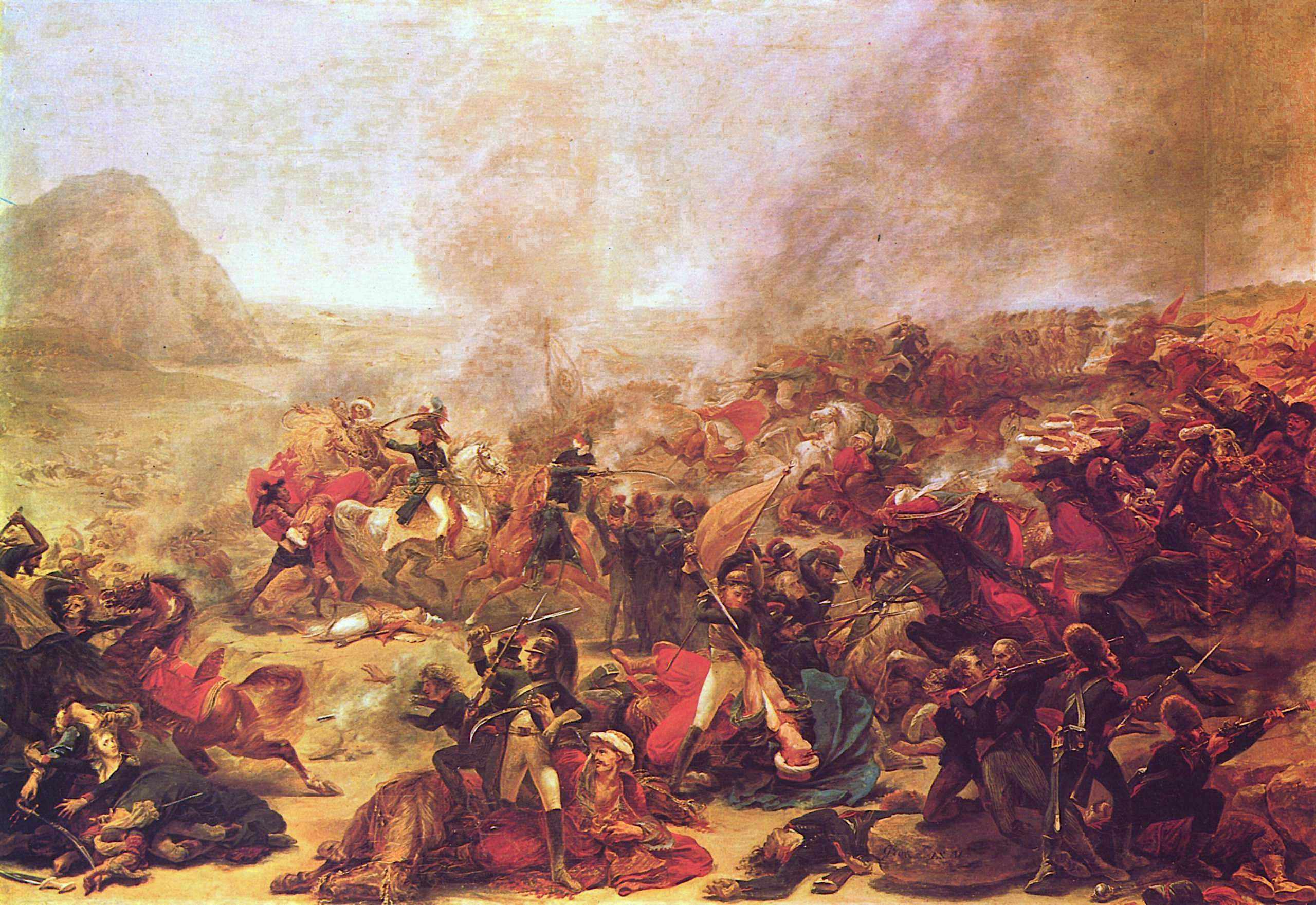
Junot leading his troops against the Ottomans near Nazareth, in The Combat of Nazareth by Antoine-Jean Gros (1801)

On 8 April 1799, during the ultimately unsuccessful Siege of Acre, Junot distinguished himself leading the vanguard of Kléber's division against an Ottoman relief force five times larger, near the town of Nazareth, retreating only after capturing five enemy standards. His actions prevented the Ottomans from reaching the city and earned Junot recognition within the army. However, he was badly injured shortly afterwards in a duel with General François Lanusse, initiated by Junot after Lanusse insulted Bonaparte. In October 1799 he was captured by a British ship while returning to France, and met Horatio Nelson.

== Consulate and early Empire ==
Junot only arrived in France on 14 June 1800, the day of Bonaparte's victory at the Battle of Marengo. That year, Junot married Laure Martin de Permond, a long-time friend of the Bonapartes. Napoleon paid for most of the wedding expenses, provided a dowry for Laure, and gave lavish gifts to the young couple. Under the consulate, Junot was known for his excesses, throwing money out of his windows and eating three hundred oysters a day.

Junot was made a general of division on 20 November 1801. From 1803 to 1804 he served as Military Governor of Paris, then briefly as ambassador to Portugal before rapidly hurrying back to serve under Napoleon at the Battle of Austerlitz (2 December 1805). Junot was then sent to Parma to put down an insurrection. On his return to Paris he was again appointed Military Governor, serving from 1806 to 1807.

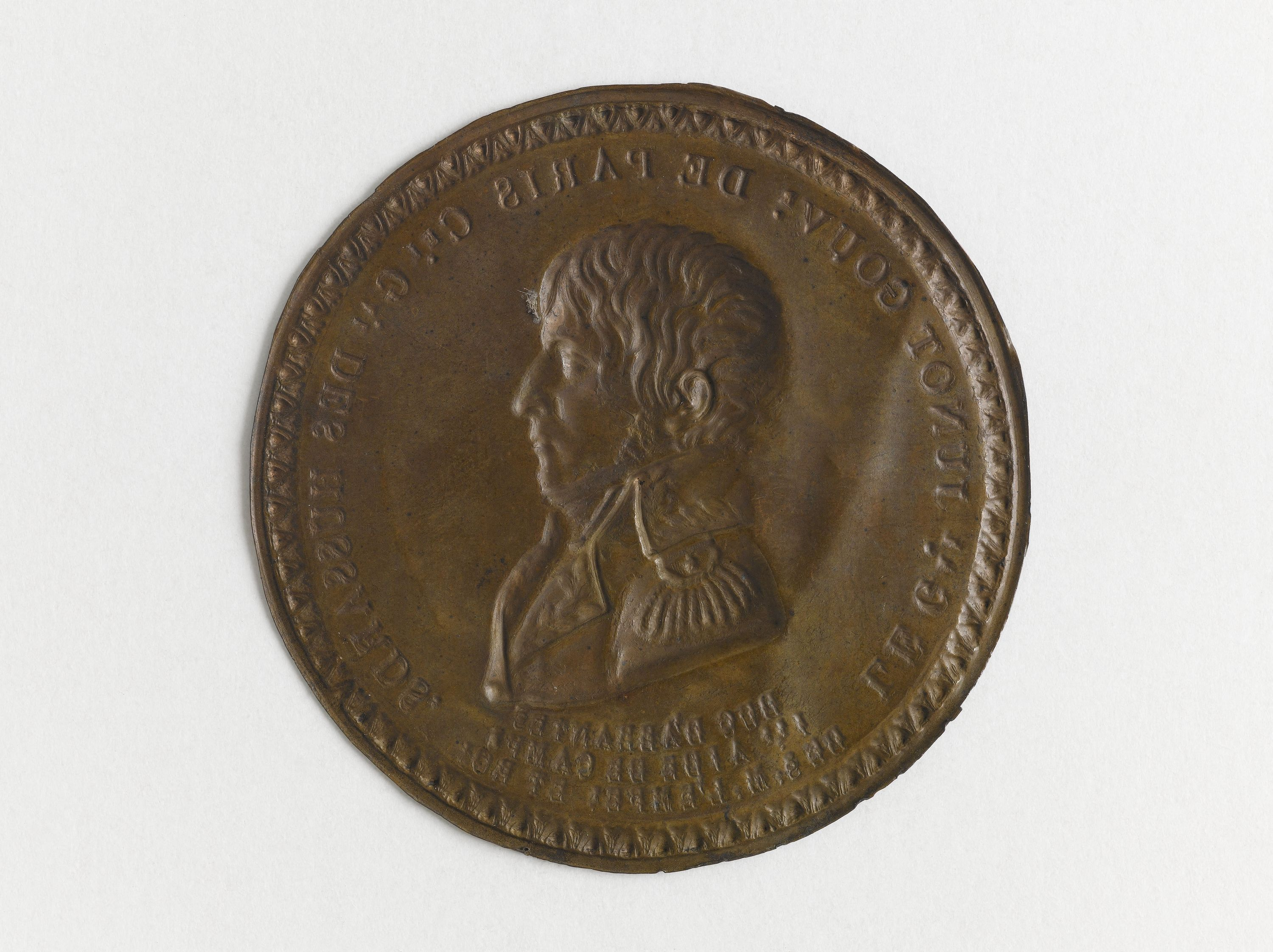
Coin bearing Junot's profile

== Invasion of Portugal ==
Junot's major command came on 29 July 1807, when Napoleon appointed him commander-in-chief of the "Gironde Observation Corps" (Corps d'observation de la Gironde), (Note: Renamed the "Army of Portugal" (Armée de Portugal) on 23 December 1807.) which was destined for an invasion of Portugal. The army assembled in Bayonne over the next two months, and was later reinforced with a Spanish contingent under the terms of the Treaty of Fontainebleau (27 October 1807). Departing on 17 October at the head of about 26,500 soldiers, Junot led his troops on an arduous march through Spain, finally crossing into Portugal at Segura on 19 November.

Facing little to no resistance, Junot's army advanced towards Lisbon, seizing Castelo Branco on 20 November and Abrantes two days later. On 24 November, he was informed that the country's regent, Prince João (the future King João VI) was preparing to flee to Brazil along with his mother, Queen Maria I, and the court. Junot entered Lisbon without a fight on 30 November, three days after the royal family's departure.

Junot protecting the city of Lisbon, allegory by Domingos Sequeira (1808)

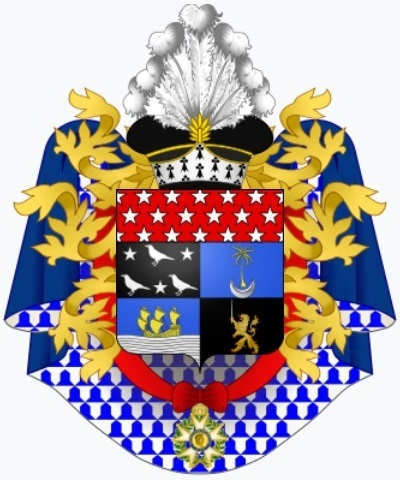
Coat of arms of Junot as Duke of Abrantès

French and Spanish troops soon occupied the rest of Portugal. For his success, Junot was granted the victory title of Duke of Abrantes (Duc d'Abrantès) by Napoleon, though he was not made a Marshal of the Empire as he expected. He set up his headquarters at the Quintela Palace in Lisbon, as the head of the military administration in Portugal. From late December 1807 to March 1808, Junot enacted far-reaching measures, such as the disbandment of the Portuguese Army (with around 9,000 soldiers joining the Grande Armée's Portuguese Legion) and local militias, the proclamation of the dethronement of the House of Braganza, and the confiscation of royal assets.

In January 1808, initial incidents of Portuguese resistance to the occupation occurred. Additionally, after the Dos de Mayo Uprising in Madrid, all Spanish troops withdrew from Portugal, and by June, popular revolts had spread throughout the country. On 1 August 1808, a British expeditionary force landed at the mouth of the Mondego river. After a French defeat at Roliça, Junot himself was beaten at the Battle of Vimeiro on 21 August 1808, and he was cut off from France.

Only the signing of the advantageous Convention of Cintra with the British allowed him to avoid capture, taking with him "the weapons and baggages" and the loot the army had managed to gather—an expression that later became famous in Portuguese usage. He went back to France in October. The terms of the Convention caused widespread outrage in Britain.

== Later career ==
Upon his return, Junot was appointed commander of the III Corps and sent to Spain, where he fought at the Second Siege of Zaragoza. In 1809, he served in the Grande Armée during the War of the Fifth Coalition, but held no major command. He was defeated at Gefrees in this war. Junot returned to the Iberian Peninsula in 1810 in command of the VIII Corps, under Marshal André Masséna, and in 1811 was shot in the face, causing serious damage and requiring surgery. Complications related to this injury were blamed for his later mental decline.

At the beginning of 1812 Junot was on leave to restore his ill health, but at the announcement of the infamous Russian campaign he rejoined the army with hopes of regaining Napoleon's favour. He was blamed for allowing the Russian army to retreat following the Battle of Smolensk (17 August), but at the Battle of Borodino (7 September 1812) he commanded the VIII Corps competently. Junot's performance at Smolensk led to his removal from command, and infuriated Napoleon to the point that he vowed never to grant Junot a marshal's baton. However, Junot himself declared that, due to various complications, it had been impossible for him to attack at Smolensk, and claimed that his rival Joachim Murat had put the blame on him.

In May 1813, Junot was made Governor of the Illyrian Provinces. His mental state rapidly deteriorated there, and on one infamous occasion he attended a ball, held by Auguste de Marmont in Ragusa, fully nude except for his dancing shoes and decorations. On another occasion he burnt down his residence and ran away to live with a madman. Some time later, Junot suffered a sudden attack of inflammation to the brain, most likely a long term consequence of his numerous head injuries, leaving him incapacitated. He was then relieved of his position and sent to his father's house in Burgundy, where he was cared for by his father, sisters and brother-in-law Albert. In a fit of distress, Junot defenestrated himself, breaking both of his legs. He became convinced that his legs needed to be amputated, and when briefly left alone he mutilated himself with a pair of scissors. Junot died of an infection days later on 29 July 1813, in Montbard.

He is buried in Montbard cemetery, where a monument was erected in his honour in 1898.

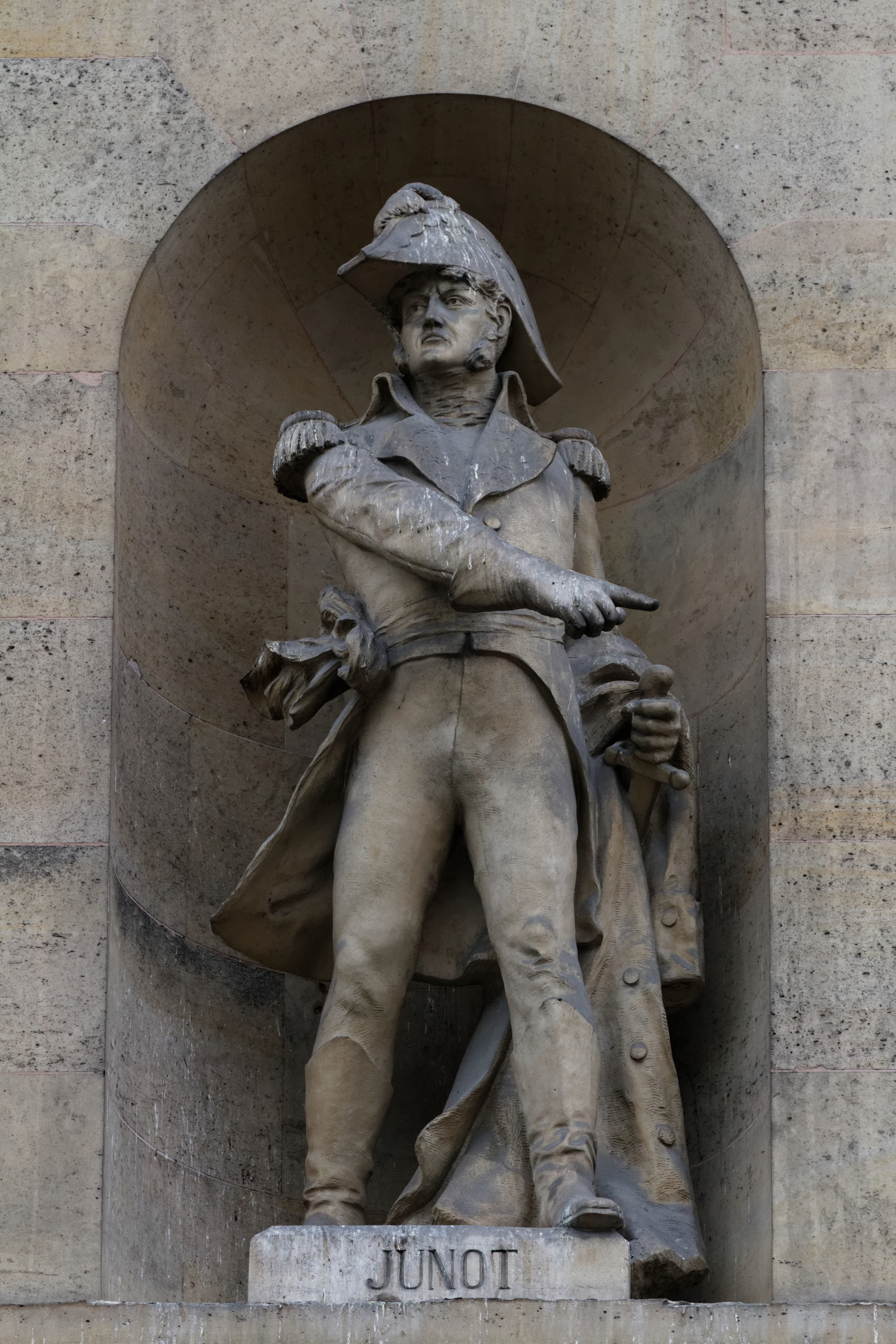
A statue of Junot on the north facade of the Louvre

== Family and relations ==
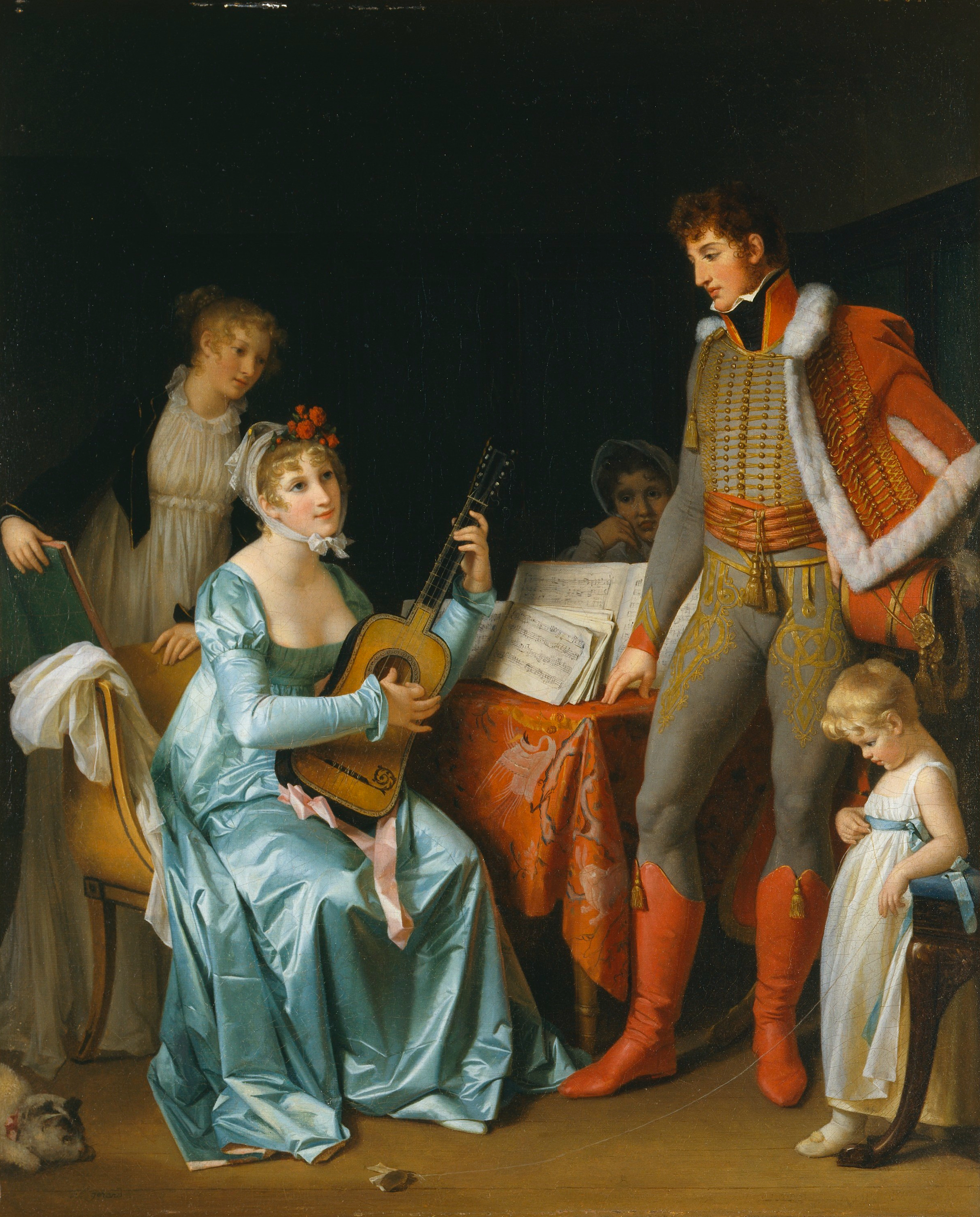
Junot and his wife Laure, by Marguerite Gérard

He had two daughters and three sons:

- Othello (Egypt, c. 1799), the child of an Abyssinian slave named Xraxarane born during the French campaign in Egypt. Junot ordered for Othello to be brought to France, but he never arrived.
- Joséphine Junot d'Abrantès (Paris, 2 January 1802 – Paris, 15 October 1888), married in November 1841 to Jacques-Louis Amet, and had issue
- Constance Junot d'Abrantès (Paris, 12 May 1803 – 1881), married in 1829 Louis Antoine Aubert (1799–1882), and had issue
- Louis Napoléon Andoche Junot, 2nd Duc d'Abrantès (Paris, 25 September 1807 – Neuilly, 20 February 1851), who died unmarried and without issue
- Andoche Alfred Michel Junot, 3rd Duc d'Abrantès (Ciudad Rodrigo, 25 November 1810 – killed in action at Solferino, 24 June 1859), married firstly on 2 April 1845 Marie Céline Elise Lepic (9 October 1824 – 6 June 1847), and married secondly on 10 January 1853 Marie Louise Léonie Lepic (19 July 1829 – 17 August 1868), both sisters, daughters of Joachim Lepic, 1st Baron Lepic, and wife Anne-Marguerite Pasquier, and had:
  - Jeanne Joséphine Marguerite Junot d'Abrantès (Paris, 22 May 1847 – Lasray, 21 March 1934), married in Paris, 16 September 1869 Xavier Eugène Maurice Le Ray (Sèvres, 15 July 1846 – Paris, 1 December 1900), who was created 4th Duc d'Abrantès in 1869, and had issue extinct in male line in 1982
  - Jérôme Napoléon Andoche Junot d'Abrantès (Paris, 16 June 1854 – Paris, 10 March 1857)
  - Marguerite Louise Elisabeth Junot d'Abrantès (Paris, 25 January 1856 – 1919), married in Paris, 11 November 1883 César Elzéar Léon Vicomte Arthaud de La Ferrière (1853–1924).

During the peninsular war, he allegedly had a relationship with Juliana de Almeida e Oyenhausen, daughter of Leonor de Almeida Portugal, 4th Marquise of Alorna.

As Governor of Paris in 1806–07, he had an affair with Caroline Murat, wife of Joachim Murat and sister of Napoleon Bonaparte. According to Laure Junot, her husband broke off the affair with Caroline after she supported the idea of him duelling Murat.

Through his sister Louise, Junot was the great-great-uncle of French poet and author Pierre Louÿs.

== Notes ==
Military offices
Preceded by Édouard Mortier	Military governor of Paris; 1803–1804	Succeeded by Joachim Murat
