= Count of Assumar =

Coat of Arms of the Almeida Portugal family, Counts of Assumar, combining the Arms of the Portugal family (Counts of Vimioso) and the Almeida family (Counts of Abrantes).

Count of Assumar was a Portuguese title of nobility granted, on 30 March 1630, by King Philip III of Portugal, to D. Francisco de Melo, son of Constantino de Bragança, a junior member of the House of Cadaval.

As Francisco de Melo supported the right of the Habsburgs to the Portuguese throne, even after their expulsion on 1 December 1640, the county returned to the Crown, and it was granted, again, by Prince Regent Pedro (who later became Peter II of Portugal) to D. Pedro de Almeida, on 11 April 1677.

== List of counts of Assumar ==
First creation

1. Francisco de Melo

Second creation

1. Pedro de Almeida (1630–1679)
2. João de Almeida Portugal (1663–1733)
3. Pedro Miguel de Almeida Portugal e Vasconcelos (1688–1756), also 1st Marquis of Alorna
4. João de Almeida Portugal (1726–1802), 2nd Marquis of Alorna
5. Pedro de Almeida Portugal, 3rd Marquis of Alorna (1754–1813), 3rd Marquis of Alorna
6. João de Almeida Portugal (1786–1805)
7. Miguel de Almeida Portugal (1787–1806)
8. Leonor de Almeida Portugal, 4th Marquise of Alorna, known as Alcipe (1750–1839), 4th Marchioness of Alorna.

== Family name ==
The Counts of Assumar family name was Almeida Portugal, once the 1st Count, D. Pedro de Almeida, descended through his paternal grandfather from the Almeida family (Counts of Abrantes) and through his paternal grandmother from the Portugal family (Counts of Vimioso).

== See also ==
- List of countships in Portugal
- Marquis of Alorna

== Bibliography ==
”Nobreza de Portugal e do Brasil" – Vol. II, pages 328/329. Published by Zairol Lda., Lisbon 1989.
