= List of Spanish–Portuguese Wars =

| Date | 1580 – 1762 |
| Location | Iberian Peninsula and respective colonies |
| Result | End of Spanish attempts to annex Portugal; Consolidation of Portuguese sovereignty |

Belligerents
| Portuguese Empire | Spanish Empire |

Commanders and leaders
| (Portugal) Prior of Crato (Portugal) John IV (Portugal) Afonso VI (Portugal) Pedro II; John V (Portugal) Joseph I | (Spain) Philip II (Spain) Philip IV (Spain) Charles II (Spain) Philip V (Spain) Charles III |

The Spanish–Portuguese Wars (1580-1762) were a series of military conflicts between the Portuguese Empire and the Spanish Empire. Triggered by the Portuguese succession crisis of 1580, the wars covered the period of the Iberian Union, the Portuguese Restoration War and later confrontations during the Seven Years' War. The conflicts determined the sovereignty of Portugal and its overseas empire, guaranteeing its permanent independence from Spain.

== List of Wars ==
=== 1580–1762 ===
- Spanish–Portuguese War (1580–1589) – After the deaths of the Portuguese kings Sebastian and Henry, Philip II of Spain claimed the throne, defeating António, the Portuguese pretender. A later English-backed attempt to restore António in 1589 failed, leaving Portugal under Spanish control until 1640.
- Spanish–Portuguese War (1640–1644) – King John IV of Portugal allied with England, the Netherlands, and France to resist Spanish attempts to regain control. Initial skirmishes at Elvas and Badajoz were followed by Portuguese victories at Olivença, Beira, and Montijo (1644). Peace negotiations began in 1644, resulting in a temporary cessation of hostilities.
- Spanish–Portuguese War (1657–1668) – After the death of King John IV, Spain renewed efforts to retake Portugal. Early Spanish successes at Olivença and Évora were reversed by Portuguese victories at Elvas (1659), Ameixial (1663), and Montes Claros (1665) under Frederick Schomberg. With English mediation, the Treaty of Lisbon (1668) ended the war, and Spain formally recognized Portuguese independence under the House of Braganza.
- Spanish–Portuguese War (1735–1737) – During the War of the Polish Succession, Spain seized the Portuguese fortress of Colonia del Sacramento, in South America. British mediation in 1737 forced Spain to return it, ending the conflict.
- Spanish–Portuguese War (1762–1763) – During the Seven Years' War, Spain and France invaded Portugal, but Portuguese forces, reorganized by the Count of Schaumburg-Lippe and supported by Britain, repelled the invasion. In South America, Spain again captured Colonia del Sacramento after a siege, but Portugal recovered it by treaty, despite a failed Anglo-Portuguese naval attempt to retake it. The conflict ended with the Treaty of Paris (1763).

=== After 1762 ===
- Spanish–Portuguese War (1776–1777) – Spain launched a major expedition under the command of Pedro de Cevallos, capturing Santa Catarina Island and forcing the surrender of Colonia. This victory secured Spanish control in the Banda Oriental and marked the end of the Spanish–Portuguese Wars in La Plata.
- War of the Oranges (1801) – In 1801, Spain and France defeated Portugal in the Iberian Peninsula, while Portugal defeated Spain in South America.
- Invasion of Portugal (1807) – French invasion of Portugal initially supported by Spain.
- Spanish Civil War (1936–1939) – Under the regime of António de Oliveira Salazar, 8,000 to 20,000 volunteers from the Viriatos Legion fought alongside Francisco Franco.

== Bibliography ==
- Kohn, George C. (2006). Dictionary of Wars. Infobase Publishing. ISBN 9781438129167.
- Clodfelter, Micheal (April 24, 2017). Warfare and Armed Conflicts. ISBN 9781476625850.
