= English expedition to Portugal (1662–1668) =

English military expedition during the Portuguese Restoration War

- Part of the Portuguese Restoration War
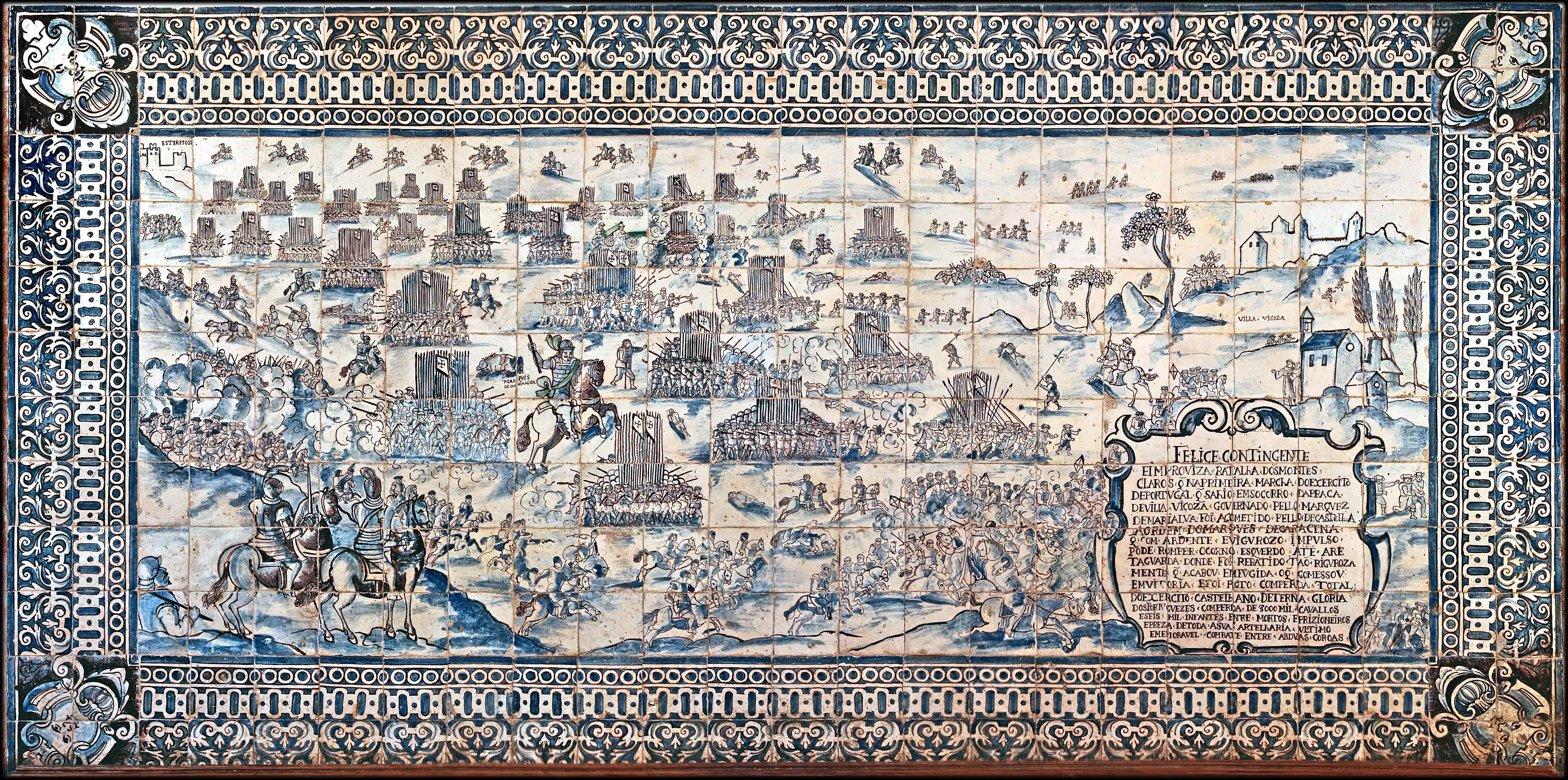
- 17th century azulejo depiction of the Battle of Montes Claros
Date	1662 – 1668
Location	Portugal
Result	Anglo–Portuguese victory
Territorial changes	Independence of Portugal

Belligerents
Kingdom of Portugal; Kingdom of England	Spain

Commanders and leaders
Afonso VI (Kingdom of England) Frederick Schomberg (Kingdom of England) Meinhardt Schomberg	Philip IV

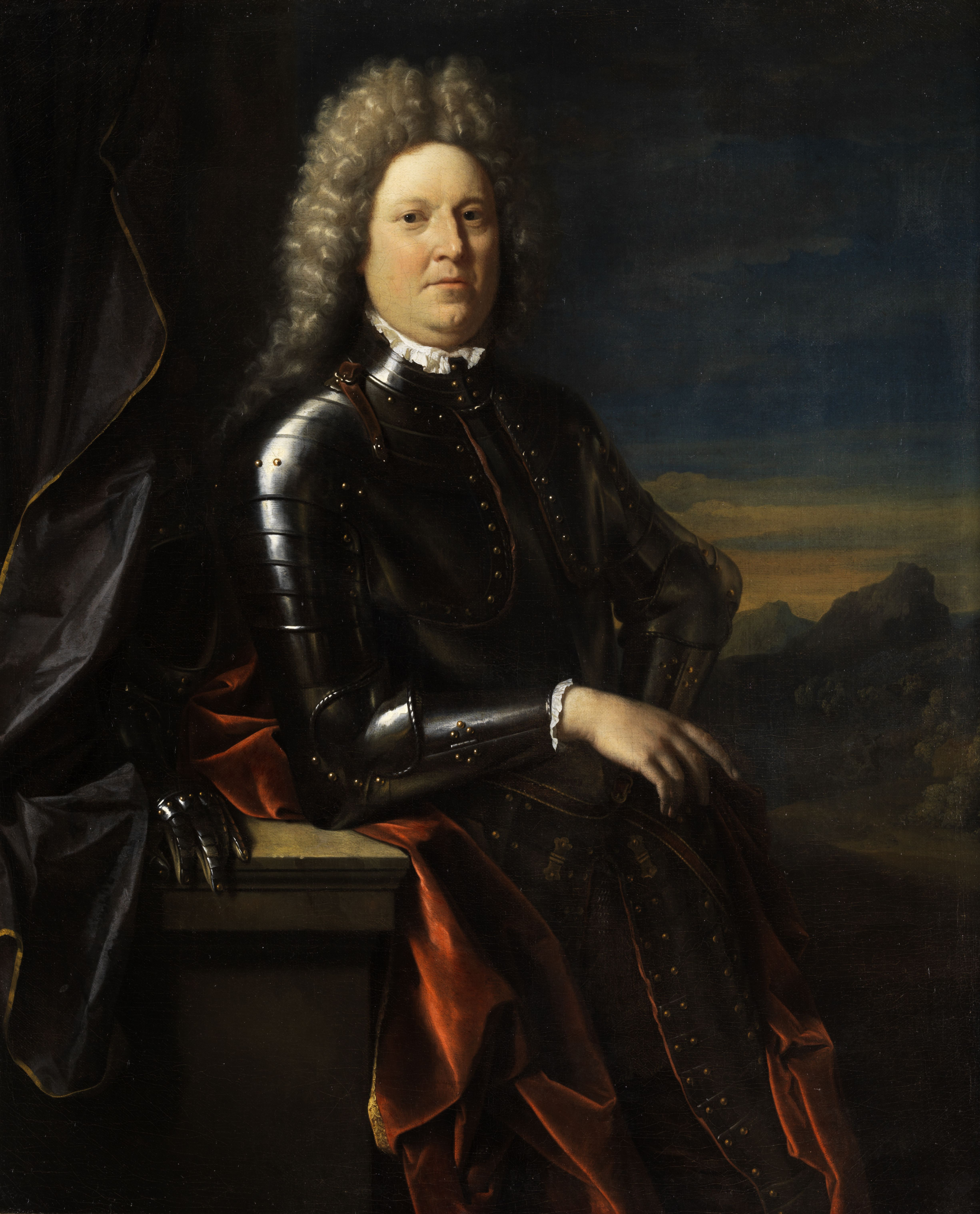
A portrait of Frederick Schomberg, who commanded the expedition

The English expedition to Portugal was a military expedition dispatched by England to Portugal in August 1662 to participate in the Portuguese Restoration War against Spain. It consisted of an English brigade largely drawn from veterans of the Eighty Years' War and the Wars of the Three Kingdoms, which fought in several major battles and skirmishes of the conflict under the command of Frederick Schomberg. The brigade remained in Portugal until the conflict's end in 1668, when it was disbanded. Under Schomberg's leadership, the brigade proved to be a decisive factor in the eventual Portuguese victory in the conflict.

== Background ==
The war between Portugal and Spain had begun with the Portuguese revolution of 1640 and had resulted in the break up of the Iberian Union. After the peace of the Pyrenees in 1659, the independence of Portugal was threatened by a resurgent Spain, and thus Portugal asked for outside support. They turned to their old ally England but the Restoration of Charles II as monarch of England proved a concern. He had previously been allied to Spain through the Treaty of Brussels after Oliver Cromwell's Republic had been at war with Spain. Charles however immediately annulled the treaty, citing King Philip IV of Spain's failure to aid in his restoration and instead answered Portugal's call for help. His marriage with Catherine of Braganza, renewed the alliance between England and Portugal despite the protestations of Spain. As part of the treaty a brigade was raised for service in Portugal in 1662 to help win her independence. The decision to send troops to Portugal came from the need to find employment for Cromwellian and Royalist veterans of the English Civil War, and the Portuguese military needed experienced veterans to help fight the Spanish.

The infantry were raised from three New Model Army regiments in Scotland that were still not disbanded. The cavalry were raised from volunteers, the majority from the Dunkirk garrison having fought the Spanish there in 1658. The Parliament of England was to raise, pay and equip the brigade, and then once in Portugal they would be paid by the Portuguese crown. Most of the soldiers were parliamentarians but also included many Catholic Royalist Irish and Scottish soldiers. They were formed, trained and commanded by Thomas Morgan, a Welsh veteran soldier from the Dutch Revolt and the Civil War. Once formed the brigade consisted of two infantry regiments, each of 1,000 men, and a cavalry regiment, just under 1,000 men totalling for the brigade around 3,000 men.

== Portugal and Spain ==
Once in Portugal, the English troops at once were put into action but in the first few months of deployment, difficulties arose from the opposition of many Portuguese officers. To add to this, the Portuguese treated the English with contempt, not the least because of their Protestant faith. Despite this, the Portuguese soon recognised that the English were the most reliable troops fighting on their side and made a more serious impression on the Spanish than other troops in the Portuguese Army. The brigade, however, suffered with sickness, which accounted for many losses, and battle casualties were rarely ever replaced from home.

The uniform of the English soldiers had red jackets (doublets) as a colour having been established during the Elizabethan times. By the 1660s red had become the predominant colour in English military uniforms since the creation of the New Model Army in 1645. The regiment of infantry or horse was usually just designated as a regiment number, and not by the name of the colonel as was custom at the time. The first colonel was Murrough O'Brien, 1st Earl of Inchiquin, who also commanded the brigade in the early stages. In 1662 he was succeeded by Frederick Schomberg in 1663 who was sent as military adviser to Lisbon with the secret approval of Charles II. Louis XIV, in order not to infringe the treaty he had just signed with Spain, deprived Schomberg of his French officers. In the field, however, the brigade was commanded by Michael Dongan, later by Lawrence Dempsey and finally by Frederick's son Meinhardt Schomberg. The first regiment was commanded by Henry Pearson while the second infantry regiment was commanded by James Apsley as colonel, and also Francis Moore as acting colonel. In 1665 the second regiment was commanded by William Sheldon.

In the spring of 1663, a Spanish army under the command of Don Juan de Austria, son of Philip IV of Spain, had overrun the greater part of south Portugal with the important city of Évora taken on 22 May. This opened up for potential march on Lisbon, 135 kilometres (84 mi) to the west. The brigade moved with the Portuguese army under Sancho Manoel de Vilhena. The first battle took place near Degebe in June where a Spanish attempt to cross the river was defeated. Following this the army met up with the Spanish army outside Évora. At the Battle of Ameixial fought nearby, the Anglo-Portuguese swiftly defeated the Spanish - Juan of Austria's standard was captured when his squadron was almost wiped out. The standard was later presented to King Afonso VI of Portugal himself. The Spanish casualties were very high, all of their artillery and baggage was captured, and the army was forced to retreat to Badajoz in Extremadura. The Spanish garrison of Évora nearly 3,700 men was then besieged but they being abandoned, capitulated on 24 June without a single casualty being inflicted on the brigade.

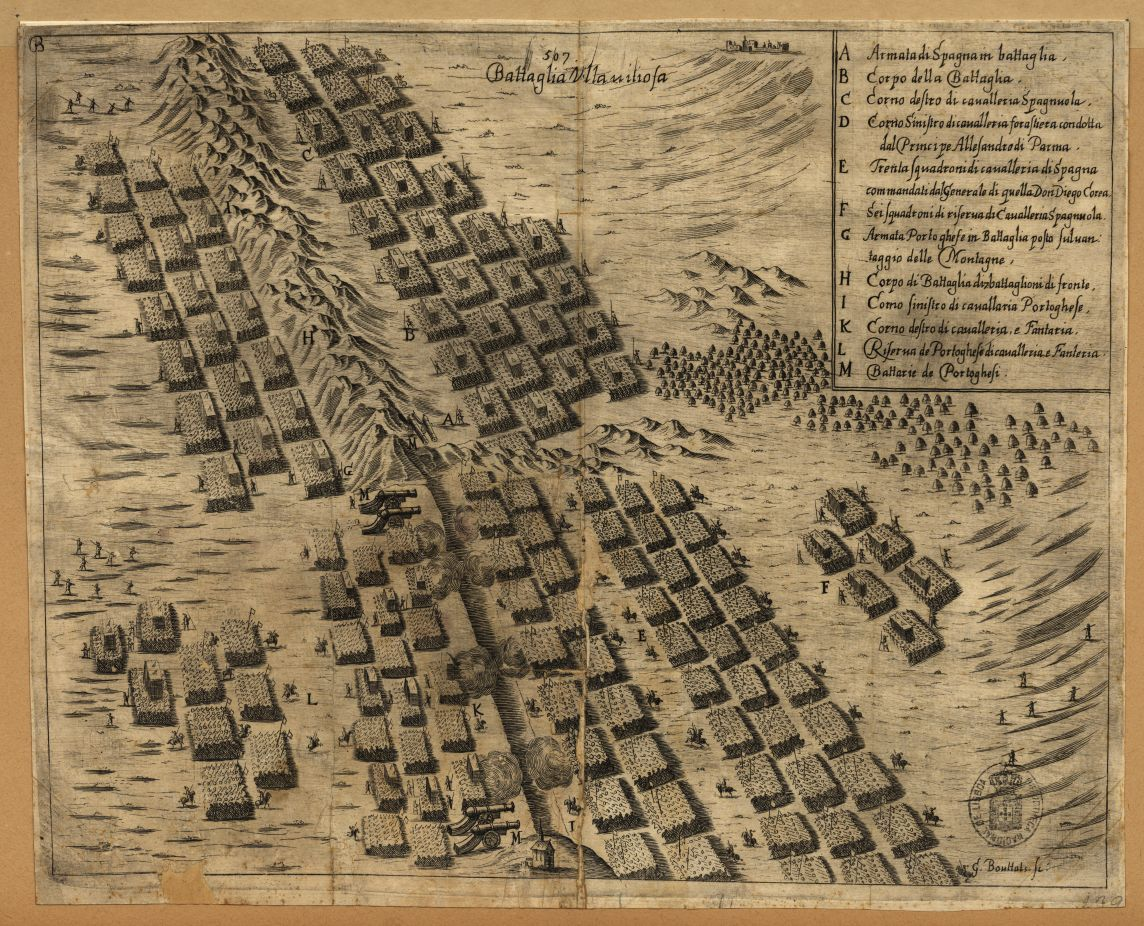
Engraving of the Battle of Montes Claros 1665 - the English brigade was crucial to the decisive victory.

After more quarrels with the Portuguese high command to get supplies to his men, Schomberg and his men pressed ahead in the next campaign. On 10 June 1664 the siege of Valencia de Alcántara took place and a fortnight later after a breach had been in the defences - the English who bore the brunt leading the main assault suffered heavy casualties but forced the surrender of the Spanish garrison. The Portuguese soon realised their mistake in the mistrust and sent heaps of praise upon Schomberg and the English. The Count of Castelo Melhor made a comment soon after the surrender of Valencia de Alcantara.

the English had done more than can be expected of them and I believe there a no soldiers in the world like them.

— Count of Castelo Melhor.

On 17 June 1665 at the Battle of Montes Claros the brigade was crucial in the outcome. The Portuguese under commander António Luís de Meneses, 1st Marquis of Marialva positioned his heaviest infantry, composing the English brigade under Schomberg once more, in two lines in the most vulnerable area and ordered his artillery to support them. As the battle raged Schomberg had his horse shot from under him, and was nearly captured, but the veteran brigade were able break the defences to bring about a decisive victory over the Spaniards under Luis de Benavides Carrillo, Marquis of Caracena.

After Montes Claros the Spaniards failed to gain any compensating advantage but the war continued and Portugal was safe from further attack. Over the next two years Schomberg and the depleted English brigade helped to lead a series of raids across the border. In November they captured the fortress of A Guarda, plundered Alburquerque and stormed Tui. Over the course of the next year little fighting took place as France signed a treaty in March 1667. This never took effect as France never declared war on Spain.

A ceasefire in September 1667 was declared after a palace coup within the Portuguese court forced King Afonso VI into exile. Castelo Melhor was dismissed and went into exile in England, where he became an adviser to King Charles II.

== Aftermath ==
A treaty had been signed by England and Spain at Madrid in 1667; in that treaty England agreed to mediate a treaty between Portugal and Spain or at least a thirty-year truce.

In 1668, desperate to reduce its military commitments, at almost any price, Spain accepted the loss of the Crown of Portugal and formally recognized the sovereignty of the House of Braganza by signing the Treaty of Lisbon with the promised English mediation.

At the conclusion of peace and with the war over, the brigade was then broken up with 1,000 men remaining in total out of the 3,500 men who made up the force. The remainder returned to seek service in England or abroad - but places and positions were hard to find.

About half of the men were incorporated in the Tangier garrison, and the remainder were shipped back to England. Some remained in Portugal having found wives or sought to join various trades.
