= Hermisende =

Coordinates: 41°58′N 6°53′W

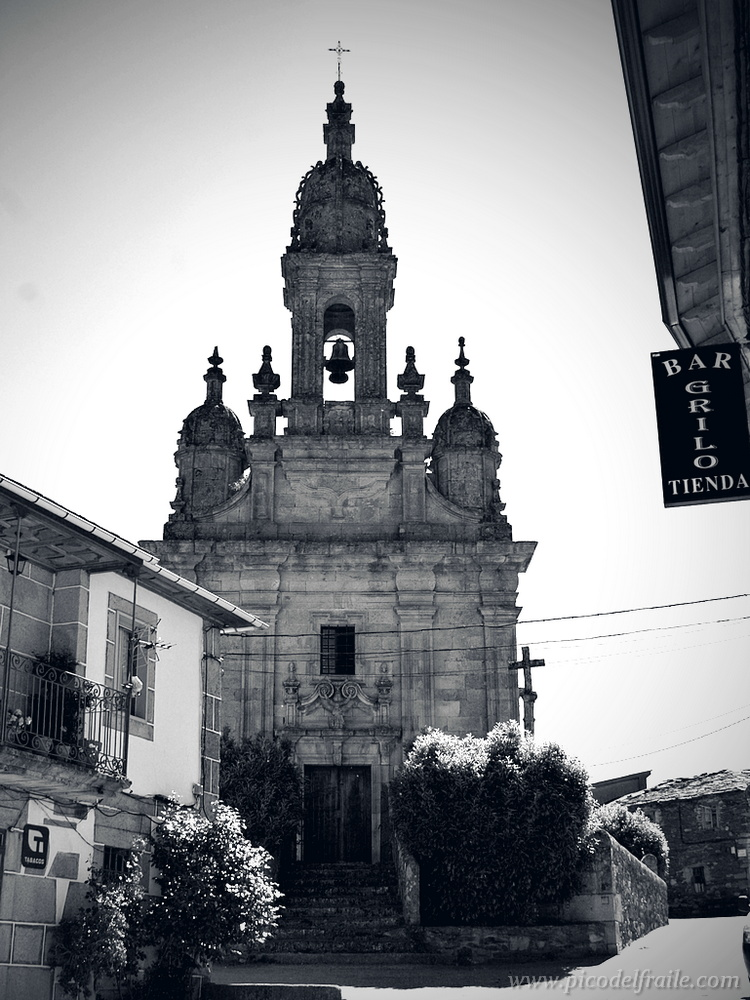

- Flag Coat of arms
- Interactive map of Hermisende
- Country: Spain
- Autonomous community: Castile and León
- Province: Zamora
- Municipality: Hermisende

Area
  - Total: 109 km^{2} (42 sq mi)

Population (2025-01-01)
  - Total: 207
  - Density: 1.90/km^{2} (4.92/sq mi)
- Time zone: UTC+1 (CET)
  - Summer (DST): UTC+2 (CEST)
- Website: www.hermisende.com

Hermisende is a municipality located in the province of Zamora, Castile and León, Spain. According to the 2004 census (INE), the municipality has a population of 383 inhabitants. It was ceded by Portugal after the Portuguese Restoration War in the Treaty of Lisbon (1668).
