= Palace of the Marquises of Fronteira =

Coordinates: 38°44′24″N 9°10′49″W

Palace of the Marquesses of Fronteira
- Palácio dos Marqueses de Fronteira (Portuguese)
- Palace of the Marquesses of Fronteira

- Location within Portugal
- Location: Lisbon, Portugal

Portuguese National Monument
- Official name: Palácio dos Marqueses de Fronteira
- Type: Property of Interest

The Palace of the Marquesses of Fronteira (Portuguese: Palácio dos Marqueses de Fronteira) is a Portuguese palace located in Lisbon, Portugal.

== History ==
The Palace of the Marquesses of Fronteira was built in 1671 as a hunting pavilion to Don João de Mascarenhas, 1st Marquis of Fronteira, who received his title from King Afonso VI of Portugal for his loyalty to the House of Braganza in the Portuguese Restoration War.

The palace is the private residence of the Marquesses of Fronteira.

== Palace ==
The palace is located in a very quiet area, near the Monsanto Forest Park. The house and the garden have glazed tiles representing different themes such as battles or monkeys playing trumpets.

The Room of the Battles has panels representing scenes of the Portuguese Restoration War. They depict the Battle of Montijo (1644), Battle of Arronches (1653), Siege of Badajoz (1658), Battle of the Lines of Elvas (1659), Battle of Ameixial (1663), Battle of Castelo Rodrigo (1664), Battle of Montes Claros (1665), and encounter at Chaves (1667).

The dining room is decorated with portraits representing some members of the Portuguese nobility, painted by artists such as Domingos António de Sequeira.

The chapel, dating from the end of the 16th century, is the oldest part of the palace. The façade is adorned with stones, shells, broken glass and porcelains. It seems that those pieces were used during the palace's inauguration and were broken on purpose just not to be used again.

In spite of being the current residence of the Marquis of Fronteira some of the rooms, the library and the garden are open to public visits.

== The garden ==
The palace garden, an area of 5,5 hectare, is adorned with Portuguese tiles with pictures that represent the different arts as well as mythological figures. The garden hedges are cut in order to represent the different year seasons. There is also a stone staircase which leads to a wall line with busts of the Kings of Portugal.

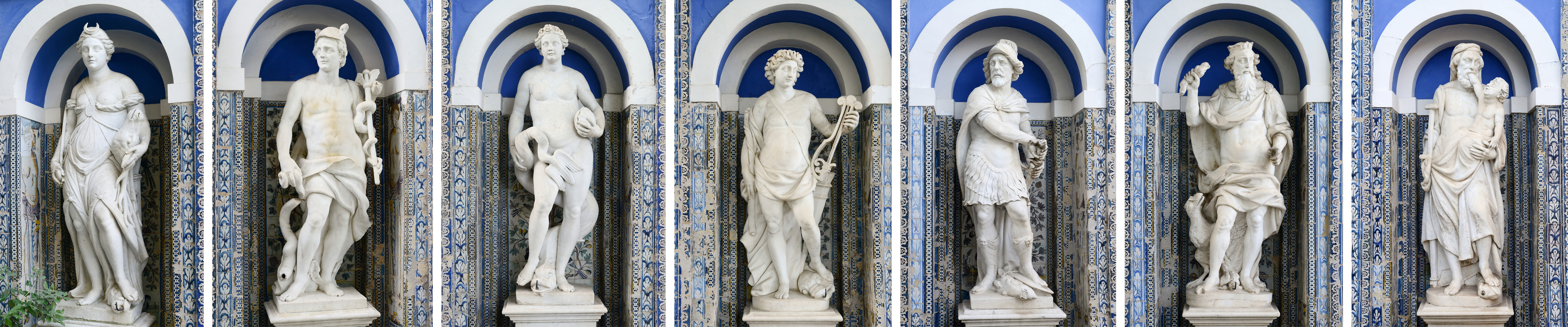
In the Gallery of the Arts, the seven classical planets, associated with the Gods. From left to right: the Moon (Diana), Mercury, Venus (Aphrodite), the Sun (Apollo), Mars, Jupiter and Saturn (Chronos)

== Gallery ==
Gate

Exterior

Garden

Garden

Gallery of the Arts

Gallery of the Arts

Gallery of the Kings

Gallery of the Kings

Gallery of the Kings

Azulejo fountain

Casa do Fresco

Casa do Fresco

Coat of arms
