= Battle of Montes Claros =

1665 battle of the Portuguese Restoration War

- Part of the War of the Portuguese Restoration
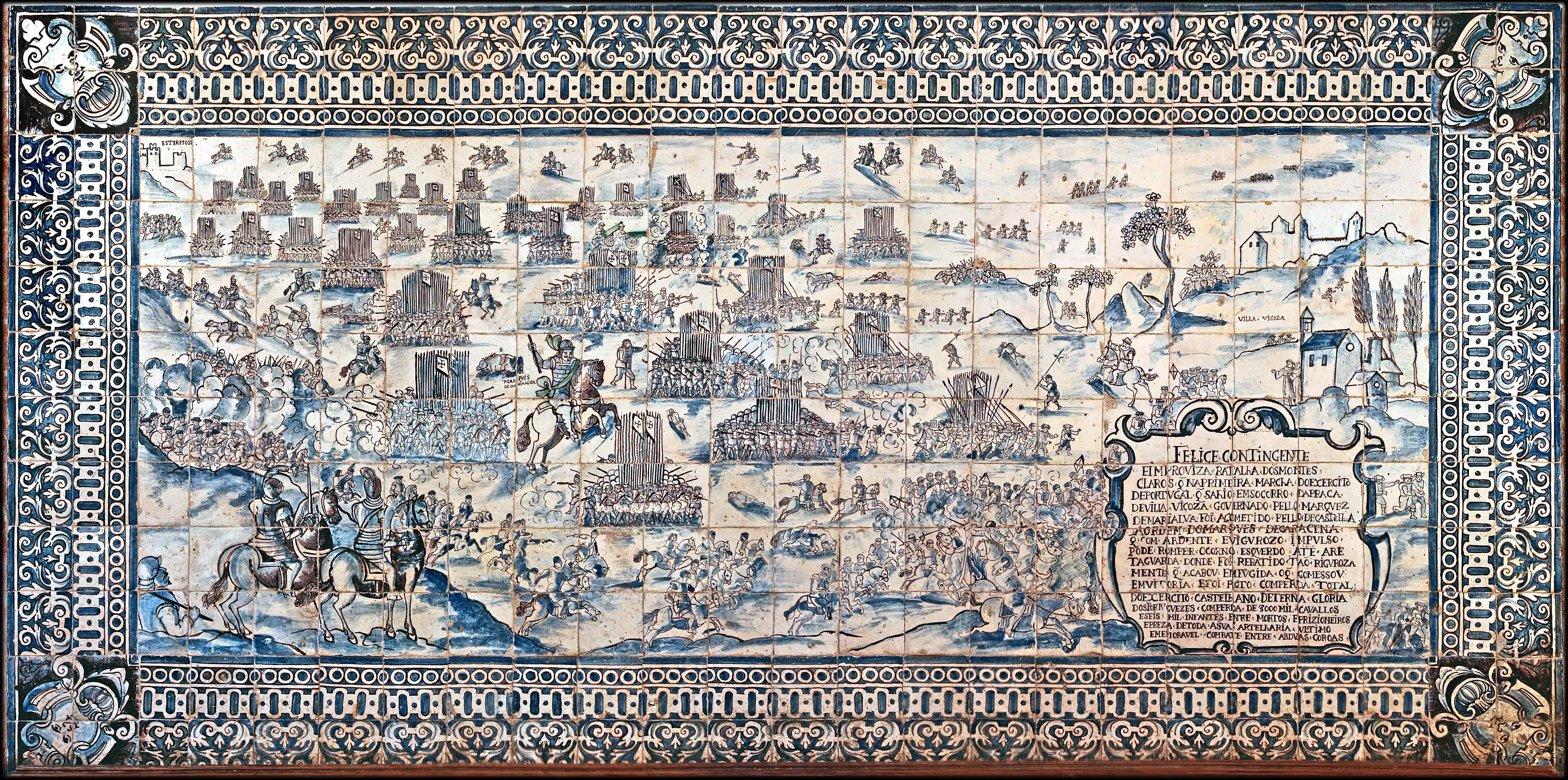
- Battle of Montes Claros, Palace of Fronteira
Date	17 June 1665
Location	Montes Claros, Évora, Portugal 38.764°N 7.472°W
Result	Anglo-Portuguese victory

Belligerents
Portugal; England	Spain

Commanders and leaders
Marquis of Marialva; Count of Ericeira; Frederick Schomberg	Marquis of Caracena

Strength
22,000	22,600

Casualties and losses
700 killed 2,000 wounded	4,000 killed 4,000 wounded 6,000 captured

The Battle of Montes Claros was fought on 17 June 1665, near Borba, between Spanish and a combined Anglo-Portuguese force as the last major battle in the Portuguese Restoration War. The battle resulted in a decisive Portuguese victory and is considered one of the most important battles in the country's history.

== Prelude ==
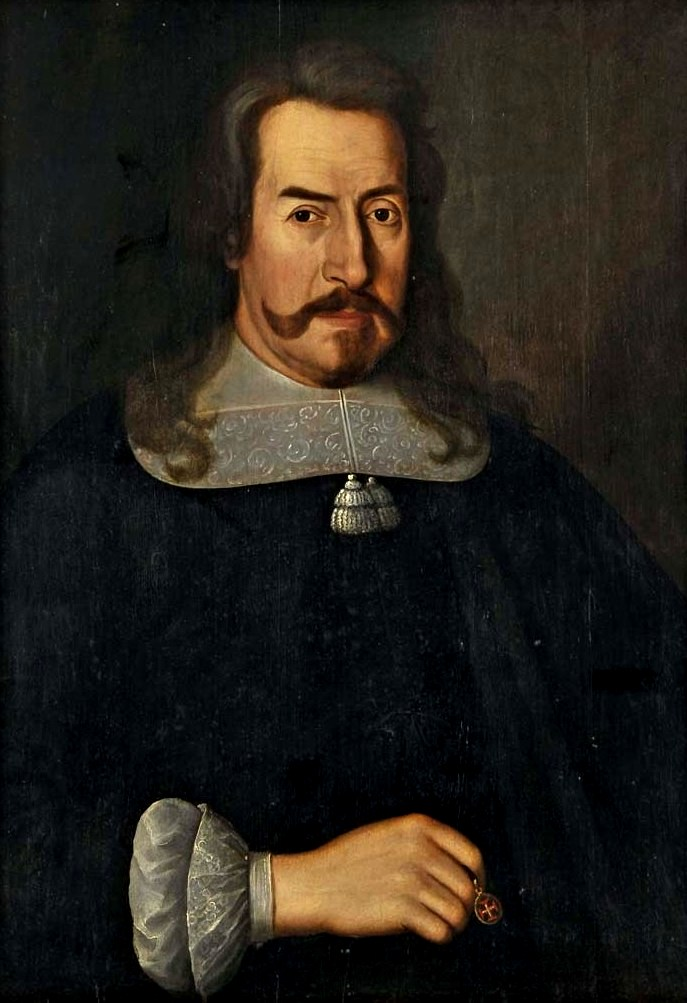
António Luís de Meneses, 1st Marquis of Marialva, commander of the Portuguese army during the battle

By 1665, the Portuguese Restoration War had been raging for 25 years. Despite numerous setbacks, King Philip IV of Spain was determined to crush the Portuguese insurrection. After a disastrous campaign in Southern Portugal culminated in the 1662 Battle of Ameixial, the Spanish court re-evaluated the performance of the Spanish Army and came to the conclusion that the war could only be ended by decisive action. The court believed that the Portuguese insurrection could only be ended by the capture of a major Portuguese city or by the complete destruction of the Portuguese Army. Luis de Benavides Carrillo, Marquis of Caracena, a veteran of campaigns in Italy and the Netherlands, was appointed to lead the new invasion of Portugal. Carrillo had served as a field commander and as a military governor, and his organizational skills were lauded. Carrillo planned to end the war by capturing the Portuguese capital of Lisbon. To reach the city, he planned first to take Vila Viçosa, followed by Setúbal.

Once he was in command, Carrillo wanted to gather his army's strength to ensure that he outnumbered whatever Portuguese army chose to engage him. However, the worsening illness of King Philip caused the court to order him to proceed with the invasion, as they feared that the death of Philip would strengthen foreign support for the Portuguese. The Spanish crown was also facing financial difficulties, and there was a legitimate fear that the army would have to be disbanded for lack of funds if the war continued.

The Portuguese were prepared and had foreseen such an attack. 3,500 men were moved from Trás-os-Montes in the north to Alentejo in the south. A further 7,800 men came from Lisbon, under command of António Luís de Meneses, who had defeated the Spanish in the Battle of the Lines of Elvas six years earlier. They were reinforced by a veteran English contingent of 2,000 men under the command of the Duke of Schomberg.

A veteran commander who had been defending the Portuguese border with Spain for over 20 years, Meneses was aware that there were any number of ways for Carrillo to invade the country. As such, he reinforced the border garrisons of Elvas and Campo Maior, hoping to harden the frontier defenses and in doing so influence the route Carrillo would take. Having been present during the Portuguese victory at Ameixial, Meneses was well aware that the Spanish faced logistical challenges when invading Portugal, and as such he planned to keep Carrillo's army trapped in the border hinterlands as long as possible to wear down their numbers. The Portuguese were also conscious of the failing health of the Spanish king, and Meneses suspected that this would force them to attack.

Carrillo's army moved into Portugal on 25 May. He first took Borba without resistance after it was abandoned by the Portuguese garrison. He then laid siege to Vila Viçosa, taking the city but failing to capture the citadel, which he was forced to besiege.

The Portuguese decided to exchange land for time, as it was hoped that the rough terrain of the hinterlands would degrade Carrillo's army. Despite this strategy, Meneses was determined to engage the Spanish army on a battlefield of his choosing. The main body of the Portuguese army set itself in motion towards the Spanish force surrounding Vila Viçosa, but it stopped in Montes Claros, halfway between Vila Viçosa and Estremoz.

Carrillo, who was at that time furthering the siege of Vila Viçosa, was fast losing men to attrition. By June, attacks by Portuguese militias were taking a heavy toll on his lines of supply, Vila Vicosa continued to put up an unexpectedly fierce defense, and the Spanish court was demanding action. In spite of these setbacks, Carrillo continued to rely on his previous plans for the capture of Lisbon. However, when informed that Meneses's numerically inferior force was advancing on him from Estremoz, Carrillo decided to engage the Portuguese.

== Battle ==
Meneses deployed his army in a defensive formation adjacent to and at the southern end of a long ridge. A dense forest and hills lay further to the south of the Portuguese positions. By defending the space between these two terrain features, Meneses planned to limit the number of Portuguese and Spanish soldiers fighting at any one time and as such counter the superior Spanish numbers. He positioned his heaviest infantry, composed of seasoned veterans, foreign volunteers, and mercenaries under the command of Frederic Schomberg in two lines in this gap and positioned his artillery to support them. The rest of the Portuguese army was held in a third, reserve line and ordered to prevent the Spanish from scaling the ridge line. Carrillo was well aware of the Portuguese defenses and massed his cavalry and artillery for an all out attack on the gap between the ridge and the forest.

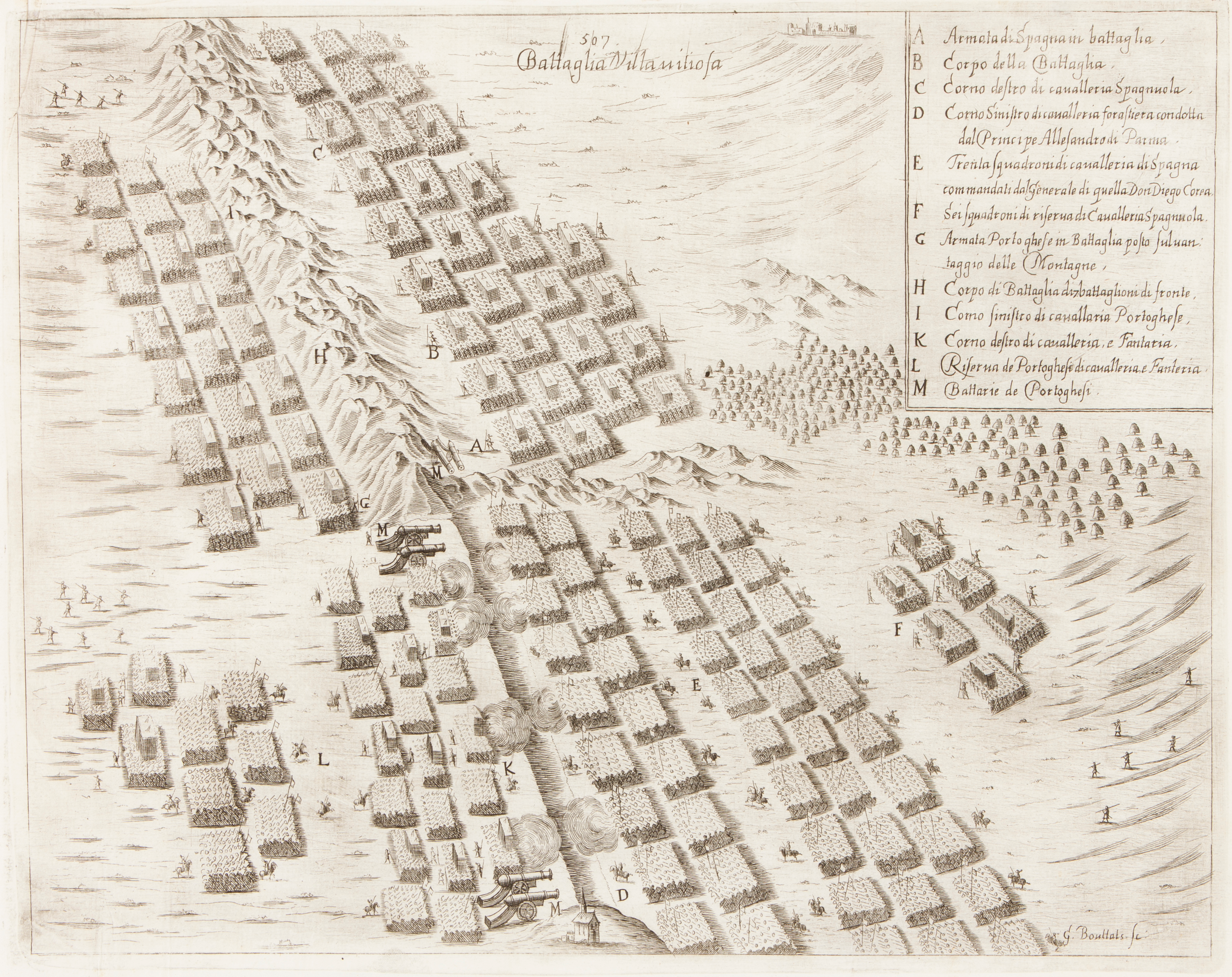
Contemporary engraving of the battle

The battle opened with the Spanish artillery firing into the Portuguese positions, opening gaps in the first line of infantry. The Spanish cavalry then charged the Portuguese left flank, succeeding in overrunning several units. The Portuguese infantry organized themselves into squares to fend off the cavalry, but this left them vulnerable to the Spanish artillery. The Duke of Schomberg's men gathered around some buildings on the left flank of the Portuguese army, using the structures and a vineyard wall to break up the advancing mass of Spanish cavalry. The Portuguese cannon fired repeatedly into the ranks of Spanish cavalry, inflicting many casualties. As the first Spanish charge retreated, Meneses ordered his first line back and consolidated it into the second line. When a Spanish cannonball killed Sir Francisco da Silva Moura, the commander of the Portuguese contingent of the second line, Meneses took command in person.

A second Spanish cavalry attack and barrage again caused many casualties in the Portuguese infantry lines, but was forced to withdraw due to the Portuguese artillery.

Carrillo then ordered a massive third charge, incorporating both cavalry and infantry, into the Portuguese defenses. The battle raged on and the fighting was extremely intense. The Duke of Schomberg had his horse shot from underneath him and was almost captured by the Spanish. The Portuguese artillery in particular was devastating as shot after shot was fired into the advancing mass of Spaniards, while the Spanish cannon were soon forced to cease in their firing for fear of hitting their own men. The assault collapsed, and Spanish infantry and cavalrymen were soon pressed tightly together, becoming easy targets for the Portuguese. The Spanish cavalry alone suffered over 1,200 casualties in the third charge against the Portuguese line.

The Cross of the Order of Christ and the Cross of Burgundy, under white background (or varied background colors, like quarters in green and white in some Portuguese regiments) were the standards more used by the Portuguese and Spanish regiments in the battlefields, respectively.

The Portuguese forces remained mostly intact, while the already diminished Spanish army – who had placed all their hopes on the cavalry charges – started to lose hope. Having failed to breach Meneses's defenses, Carrillo began to slowly withdraw to the north.

Then, after 7 hours of ferocious fighting, the Portuguese launched a counterattack. The Portuguese cavalry led by D. Luis Melo e Castro, which had until this point played a limited role in the battle, charged and overcame the weakened left flank of the Spanish army. The Spanish army started to fall apart and fled in disorder towards Juromenha, leaving behind all their artillery and many dead and wounded. Thousands of Spanish soldiers were captured and made prisoners, with eight Spanish generals being among the captured.

Almost all of the 1,500 Spanish fugitives who had taken refuge in the many woods around Vila Viçosas for fear of being killed if they surrendered eventually died as a result of their wounds and hunger in the weeks following the battle. A great many arms and armaments were captured by the Portuguese. The total Spanish casualties in this campaign to conquer Portugal amounted to 4,000 killed on the battlefield, 1,200 to 1,500 killed during the siege of Vila Viçosa (before the battle), almost 1,500 fugitives who died in the immediate weeks after the battle and eventually 6,000 prisoners and 4,000 wounded. The Portuguese suffered some 700 killed and more than 2,000 wounded.

== Aftermath ==
The Battle of Montes Claros effectively ended major combat operations during the Restoration War and definitively secured Portuguese independence from Spain. The Spanish did not attempt another invasion; instead the defeat led to a treaty being signed between England and Spain at Madrid in 1667. As a result of this England mediated the Treaty of Lisbon which was signed by Portugal and Spain a year later. Portugal's new ruling dynasty, the House of Braganza, was recognized.

== See also ==
- English Expedition to Portugal (1662–1668)

== Notes ==
=== References ===
- Anonymous (1665). Relacion verdadera, y pontual, de la gloriosissima victoria ... de Montes Claros. Oficina Henrique Valente de Oliveira.
- John, Childs (1976). The Army of Charles II. University Of Toronto Press. ISBN 978-0415846110.
- McMurdo, Edward (2010). The History of Portugal – From the Reign of D. Joao II. to the Reign of D. Joao V. Volume III. Read Books Design. ISBN 978-1444695694.
- Riley, Jonathon (2014). The Last Ironsides: The English Expedition to Portugal, 1662–1668. Helion & Company. ISBN 978-1909982208.
