= Sancho Manuel de Vilhena =

His Lordship The Count of Vila Flor
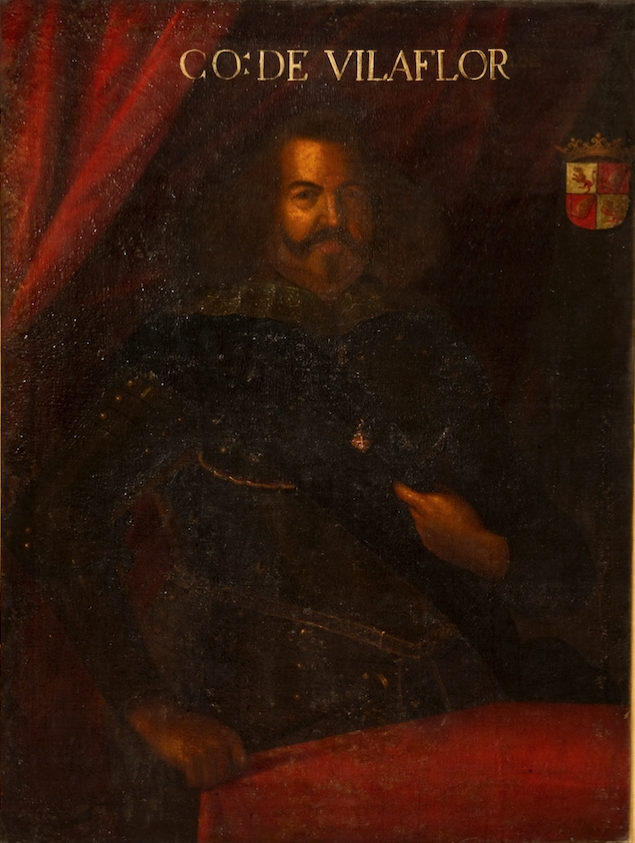
- Portrait by Feliciano de Almeida, c. 1673–75
- Born: 1610; Lisbon, Portugal
- Died: 3 February 1677 (aged 66–67) Lisbon, Portugal
- Allegiance: Kingdom of Portugal
- Rank: General
- Conflicts: Dutch–Portuguese War; Portuguese Restoration War; Battle of the Lines of Elvas; Battle of Ameixial
- Children: António Manoel de Vilhena

D. Sancho Manuel de Vilhena, 1st Count of Vila Flor (1610 – 3 February 1677), was a Portuguese nobleman and military leader, of royal background.

He participated in several battles in Central Europe and fought the Dutch in Brazil between 1638 and 1640. During the Portuguese Restoration War, he was appointed general, and participated in the defence of Beira. His greatest victories were the Battle of the Lines of Elvas in 1659 and the Battle of Ameixial in 1663.

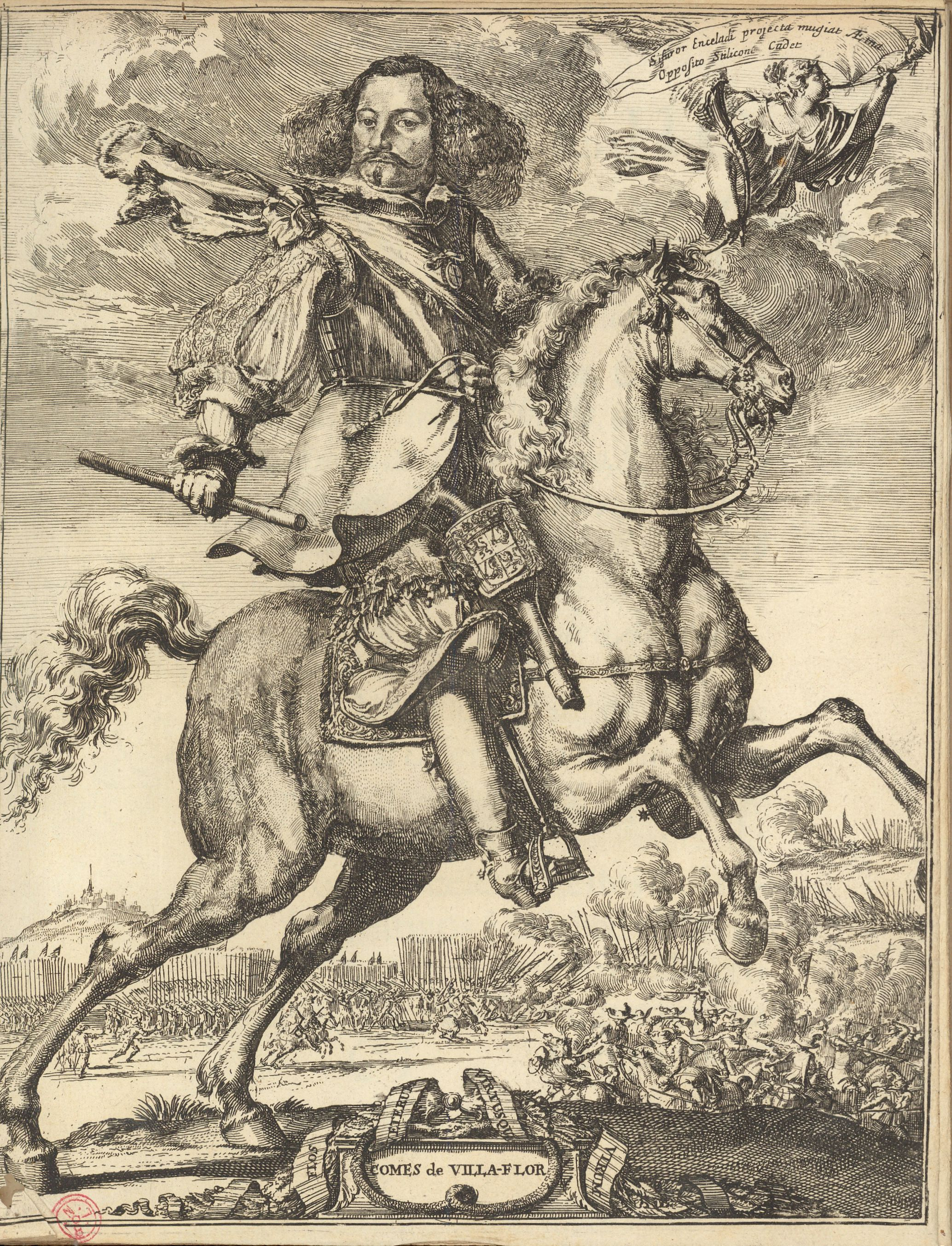
Equestrian portrait of the Count of Vila Flor with the Battle of Ameixial in the background, in Aplausos Académicos e Relação do Felice Sucesso da Célebre Vitória do Ameixial, 1673

António Manuel de Vilhena, Grand Master of the Order of Saint John and ruler of Malta, was his fifth son.

He was memorialized in a prominent azulejo of the Room of the Battles (Sala das Batalhas) in the Palace of the Marquises of Fronteira, created in 1671–72 and depicting the Battle of Ameixial.
