= Castle of Degebe =

Castle in Portugal

Coordinates: 38°24′54.5″N 7°33′27.4″W

- Castelo Velho do Degebe
- Évora, Alentejo Central, Alentejo in Portugal

Site information
- Type: Castle
- Owner: Portuguese Republic
- Operator: Herdade dos Carneirizes
- Open to the public: Private

The Castle of Degebe (Portuguese: Castelo Velho do Debege) is a medieval castle located in the civil parish of Reguengos de Monsaraz, in the municipality of Reguengos de Monsaraz, Portuguese district of Évora.

== History ==
The foundations of the old castle date to an Iron Age settlement.

The location was intensely forested with Eucalyptus by the property owner, from information of Dr. António Carlos Silva (12 June 1989), from the Serviços Regionais de Arqueologia do Sul (Southern Archaeology Regional Services) of the Instituto Português do Património Cultural (the predecessor of the IGESPAR.

== Architecture ==
The remains of the medieval castle is located in a rural location, in the spur of bedrock and steep slopes at the confluence of the Ribeira da Caridade and the Degebe River, isolated and in harmony with the surrounding environment. It is a vast space defended and encircled by walls natural slope, limited in the west by the Degebe River and in the east by the Ribeira da Caridade, and protected in the north, by a double line of fortifications that transforms into an island. The castle is slightly long, irregular plan oriented north to south.
