= Battle of Ameixial =

1663 battle of the Portuguese Restoration War

- Part of Portuguese Restoration War
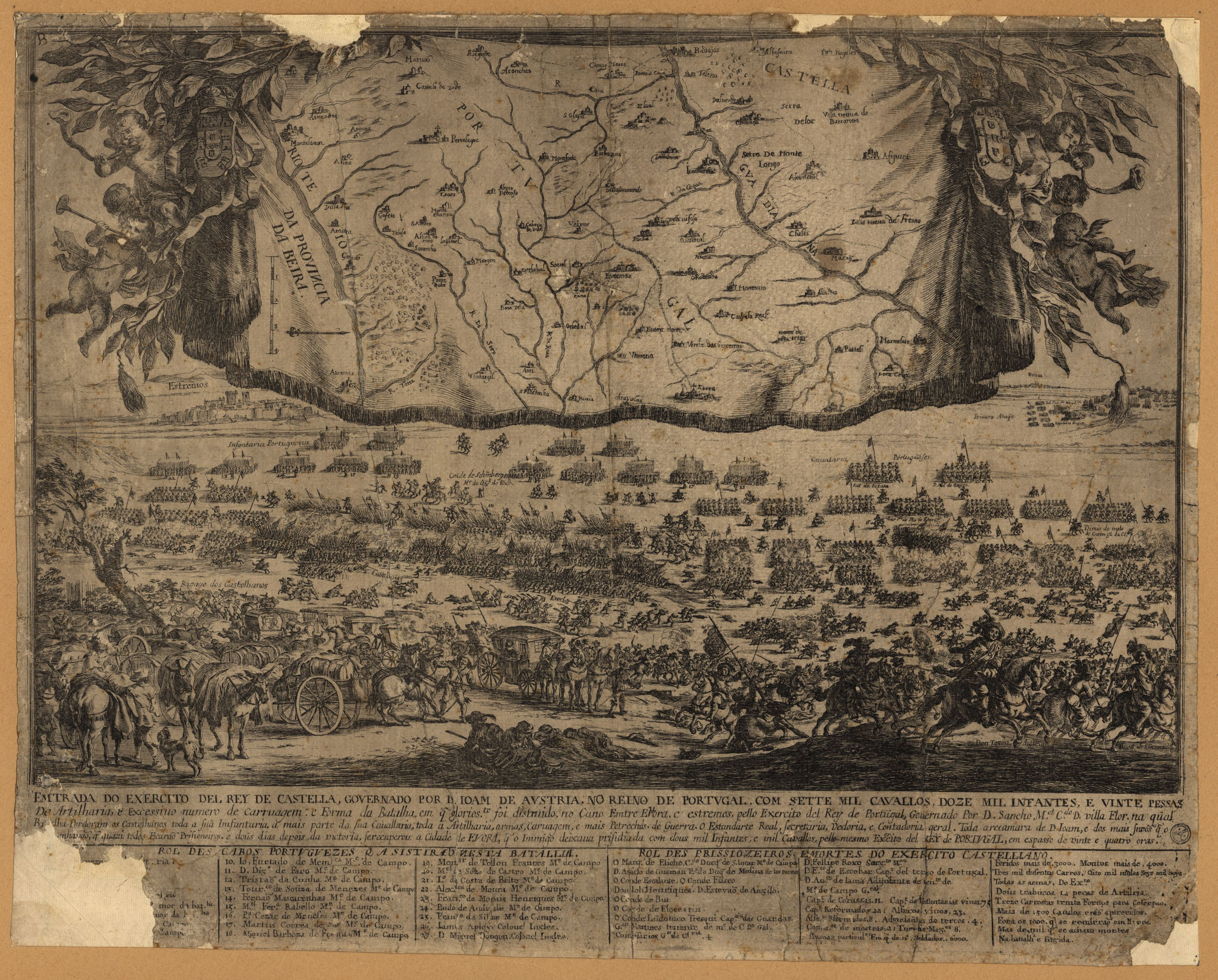
- 17th-century Portuguese engraving depicting the Battle of Ameixial
Date	8 June 1663
Location	Near Estremoz, Portugal 38.85°N 7.65°W
Result	Anglo-Portuguese victory

Belligerents
Portugal; England	Spain

Commanders and leaders
(Portugal) Count of Vila Flor; Frederick Schomberg (Portugal) Count of Ericeira	(Spain) John of Austria

Strength
17,000 (3,000 from British Isles): 14,000 infantry; 3,000 cavalry; 15 cannons	18,500: 12,500 infantry (26 Spanish Tercios, 8 Italian Tercios, 5 German Tercios and one French Tercio); 6,000 cavalry (11 trozos or bodies); 18 cannons

Casualties and losses
More than 1,000 Portuguese killed 100 English casualties	4,000 killed All the artillery captured

The Battle of Ameixial, was fought on 8 June 1663, near the village of Santa Vitória do Ameixial, some 10 kilometres (6.2 mi) north-west of Estremoz, between Spanish and Portuguese as part of the Portuguese Restoration War. In Spain, the battle is better known as the Battle of Estremoz.

== Background ==
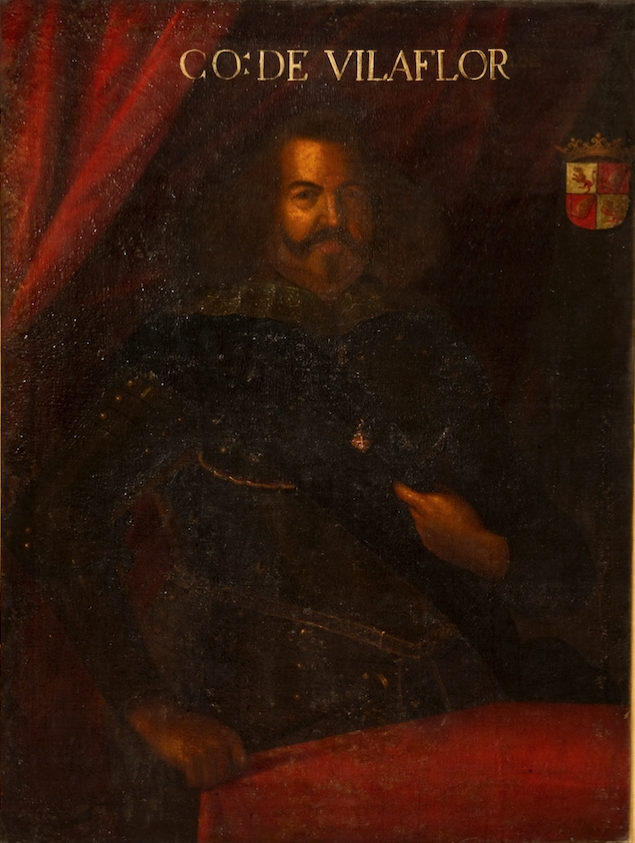
D. Sancho Manuel de Vilhena, Count of Vila Flor, commander of the Portuguese Army in the battle, portrayed in 1673–75 by Feliciano de Almeida (Galleria degli Uffizi, Florence)

In the spring of 1663, the Spanish had undertaken their most successful attack on Portugal, since the beginning of the war.

Under command of John of Austria the Younger, son of Philip IV of Spain (and the conqueror of Catalonia and of the Kingdom of Naples and winner of the French in Italy), the greater part of the south of Portugal was overrun. The important city of Évora was taken on 22 May, opening perspectives for a march on Lisbon, 135 kilometres (84 mi) to the west.

But the lack of ammunition, food and money paralysed the Spanish army. The Portuguese raised a 17,000 men strong army led by Sancho Manoel de Vilhena, aided by Frederick Schomberg, 1st Duke of Schomberg, Fernando de Meneses, Count of Ericeira and other senior officers, and marched against the Spanish. The Spanish commander decided to retreat to a strategic position at the north east of Évora and wait for the enemy, leaving a garrison of 3,700 in Évora.

The Portuguese army was reinforced by three regiments (1 cavalry & 2 infantry) of about 3,000 troops, from England (mostly from around the British isles) which were put under the command of the Duke of Schomberg. Also included were a small number of mercenaries from France. Of this foreign contingent, almost 2,000 English fought in Ameixial, about 1600 incorporated in the infantry and 300 in the cavalry.

== Battle ==
The two armies met on June 8th in the fields of Ameixial, 5 km from Estremoz. The Spanish were defeated and withdrew to Arronches and then to Badajoz.

The standard of Don John of Austria was captured when his squadron was almost totally killed. The standard was later presented to King Afonso VI of Portugal himself.

Thus, thanks to the victory of this battle, one of the most dangerous Spanish attacks of the Restoration War ended.

== Aftermath ==
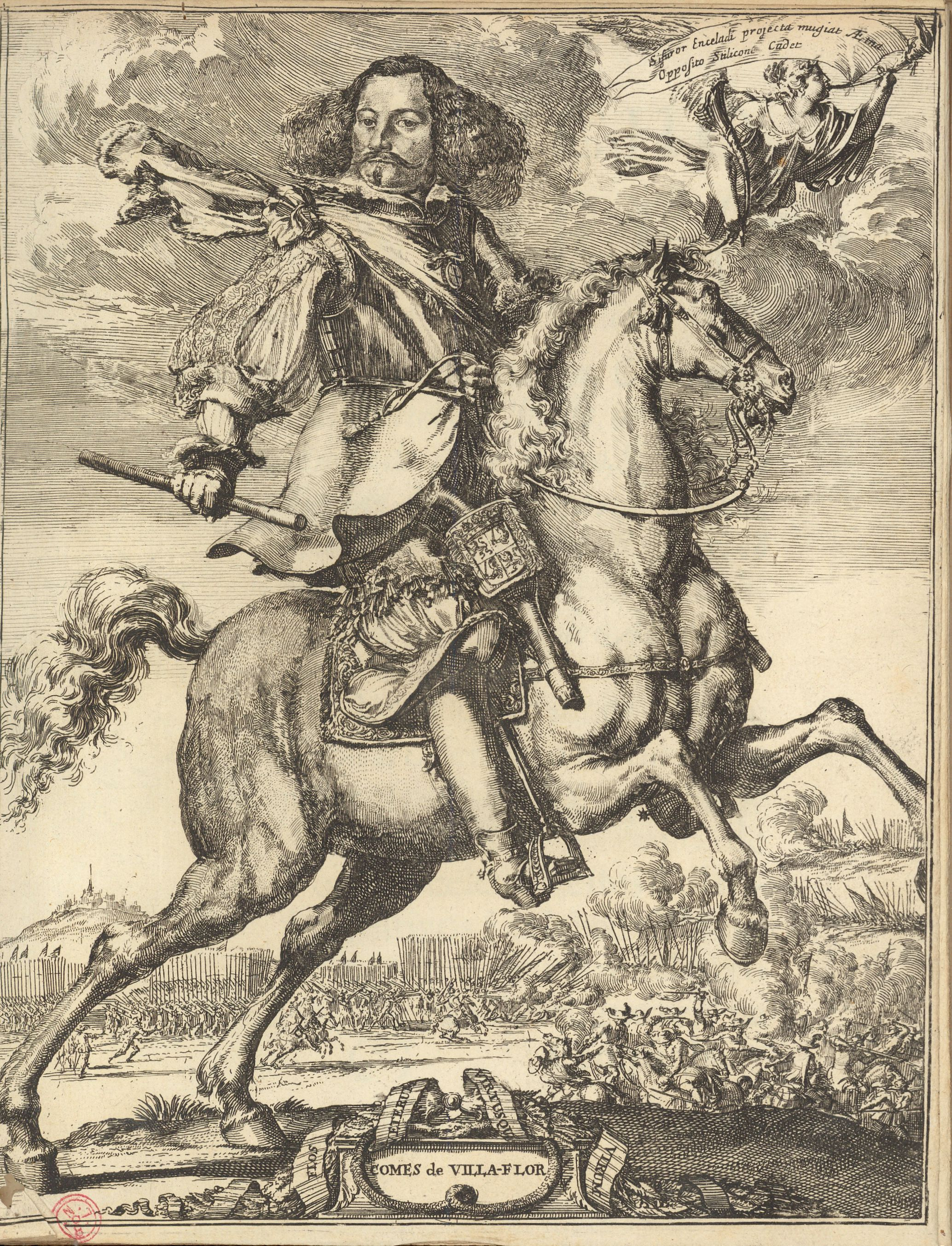
Equestrian portrait of the Count of Vila Flor with the Battle of Ameixial in the background, in Aplausos Académicos e Relação do Felice Sucesso da Célebre Vitória do Ameixial, 1673

The Spanish casualties were very high, all of their artillery and baggage was captured, and the army was forced to retreat to Badajoz in Extremadura. When the Spanish garrison of Évora of 3,700 men capitulated on 24 June 1663, the whole expedition was a complete failure. The independence of the Kingdom of Portugal was saved while the military career of John of Austria ended.

A memorial stone was placed on the site of the battlefield.

The battle is memorialized in a prominent azulejo of the Room of the Battles (Sala das Batalhas) in the Palace of the Marquises of Fronteira, created in 1671–1672.

== See also ==
- English expedition to Portugal (1662–1668)
