= Portuguese Restoration War =

1640–1668 war between Portugal and Spain

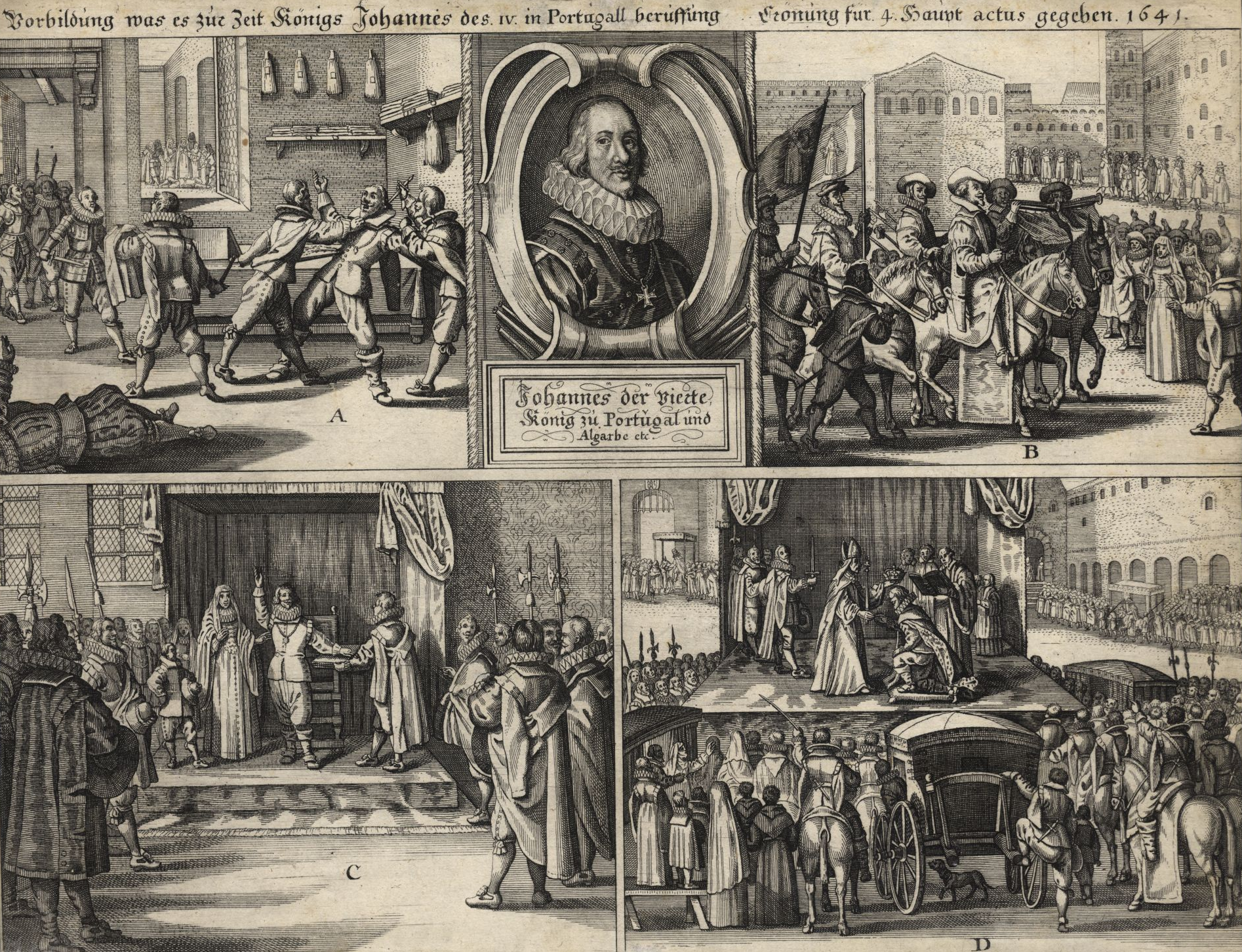
- Contemporary engraving (clockwise from left); Assassination of Miguel de Vasconcelos; Lisbon learns of the coup d'état; Acclamation of John IV of Portugal; John is sworn as King of Portugal
Date	December 1640 to February 1668
Location	Portugal and Spain
Result	Treaty of Lisbon (1668)
Territorial changes	Portugal cedes Ceuta and Hermisende to Spain; Dissolution of Iberian Union

Belligerents
Portugal	Spain

Commanders and leaders
John IV; Luisa de Guzmán; Afonso VI; Peter II; Castelo Melhor; Marquis of Marialva; Vila Flor; Matias de Albuquerque; Schomberg	Philip IV; Mariana of Austria; Charles II of Spain; Olivares; Luis de Haro; Don Juan; Duke of Osuna; Carlo Caracciolo; Marquis of Caracena

The Portuguese Restoration War (Note: Portuguese: Guerra da Restauração, or Acclamation War Guerra da Aclamação) was a series of armed conflicts from December 1640 to February 1668 that ended with the Treaty of Lisbon which dissolved the Iberian Union between Portugal and Spain.

For the most part, the conflict consisted of periodic low level skirmishes, along with short episodes of more serious fighting. The Treaty of Lisbon (1668) recognised the House of Braganza as Portugal's new ruling dynasty, replacing the House of Habsburg which had held the Portuguese crown in personal union with Spain since 1580.

== Background ==
The Portuguese succession crisis of 1580 led to the creation of the Iberian Union, a personal union between Habsburg Spain and Portugal. When Philip IV succeeded his father in 1621, he adopted a less conciliatory approach to Portuguese affairs. Their merchants paid higher taxes, its nobility lost influence within the Cortes Generales, and domestic appointments increasingly went to Spanish outsiders. In addition, Spanish involvement in the Eighty Years' War led to Dutch attacks on Portuguese colonies and outposts. Spain's preoccupation with their own empire resulted in the neglect of Portuguese interests in Asia and the Americas.

The consequent unrest resulted in a plot to restore Portuguese independence by a group known as the Forty Conspirators. With Spanish resources absorbed by the Thirty Years' War and a simultaneous revolt in Catalonia, on 1 December 1640, Antão Vaz de Almada, Miguel de Almeida and João Pinto Ribeiro assassinated Miguel de Vasconcelos, the Secretary of State, and imprisoned Philip's cousin, Margaret of Savoy, Vicereine of Portugal.

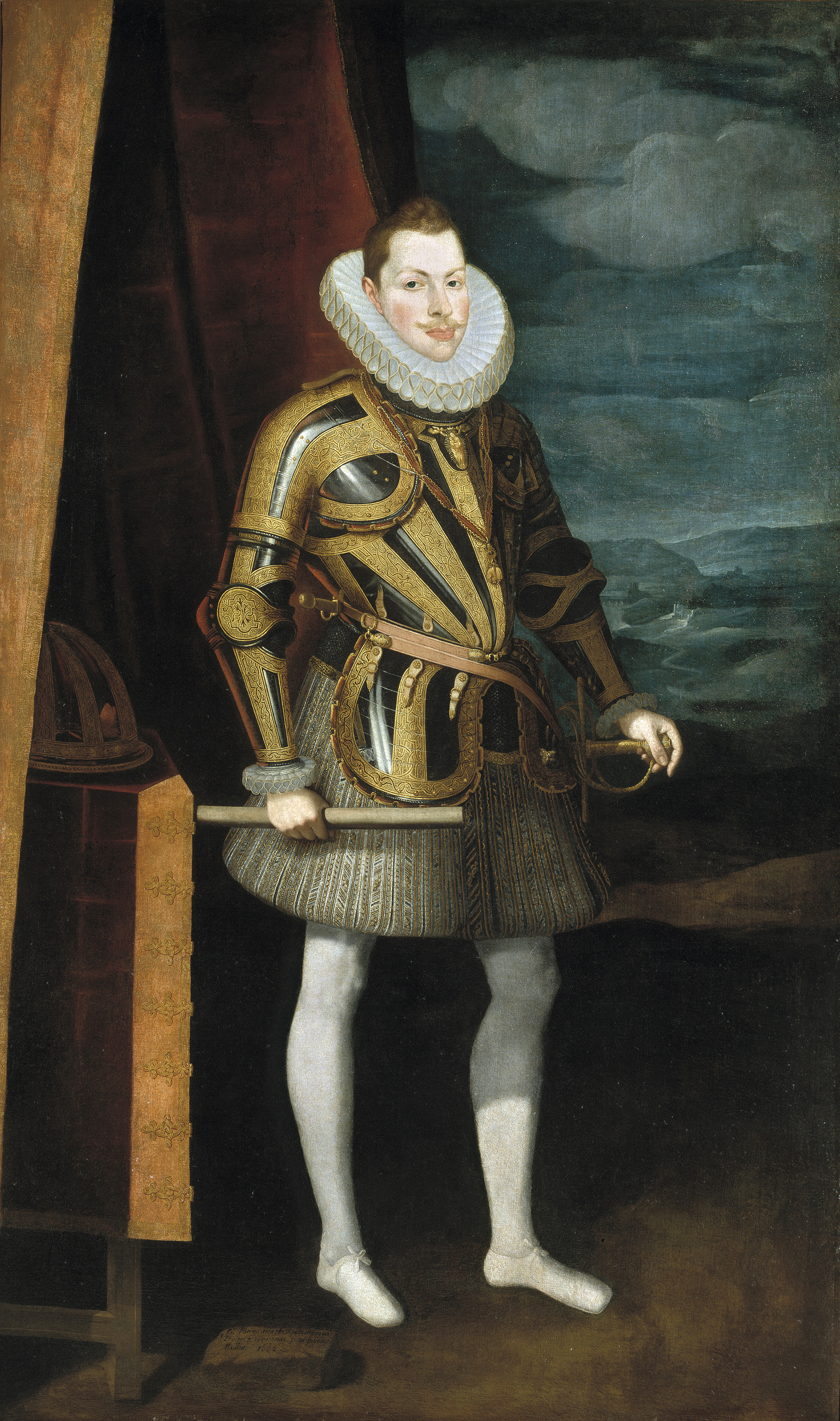
Philip III of Spain

The support of the people became apparent almost immediately and within a matter of hours, Philip III's third cousin John, 8th Duke of Braganza, was acclaimed as King John (João) IV of Portugal. The news spread quickly throughout the country. By 2 December 1640, the day after the coup, John IV, acting in his capacity as sovereign of the country, had sent a letter to the Municipal Chamber of Évora.

The ensuing conflict with Spain brought Portugal into the Thirty Years' War as at least a peripheral player. From 1641 to 1668, the period during which the two nations were at war, Spain sought to isolate Portugal militarily and diplomatically, and Portugal tried to find the resources to maintain its independence through political alliances and maintaining its colonial income.

== Preparations for war ==
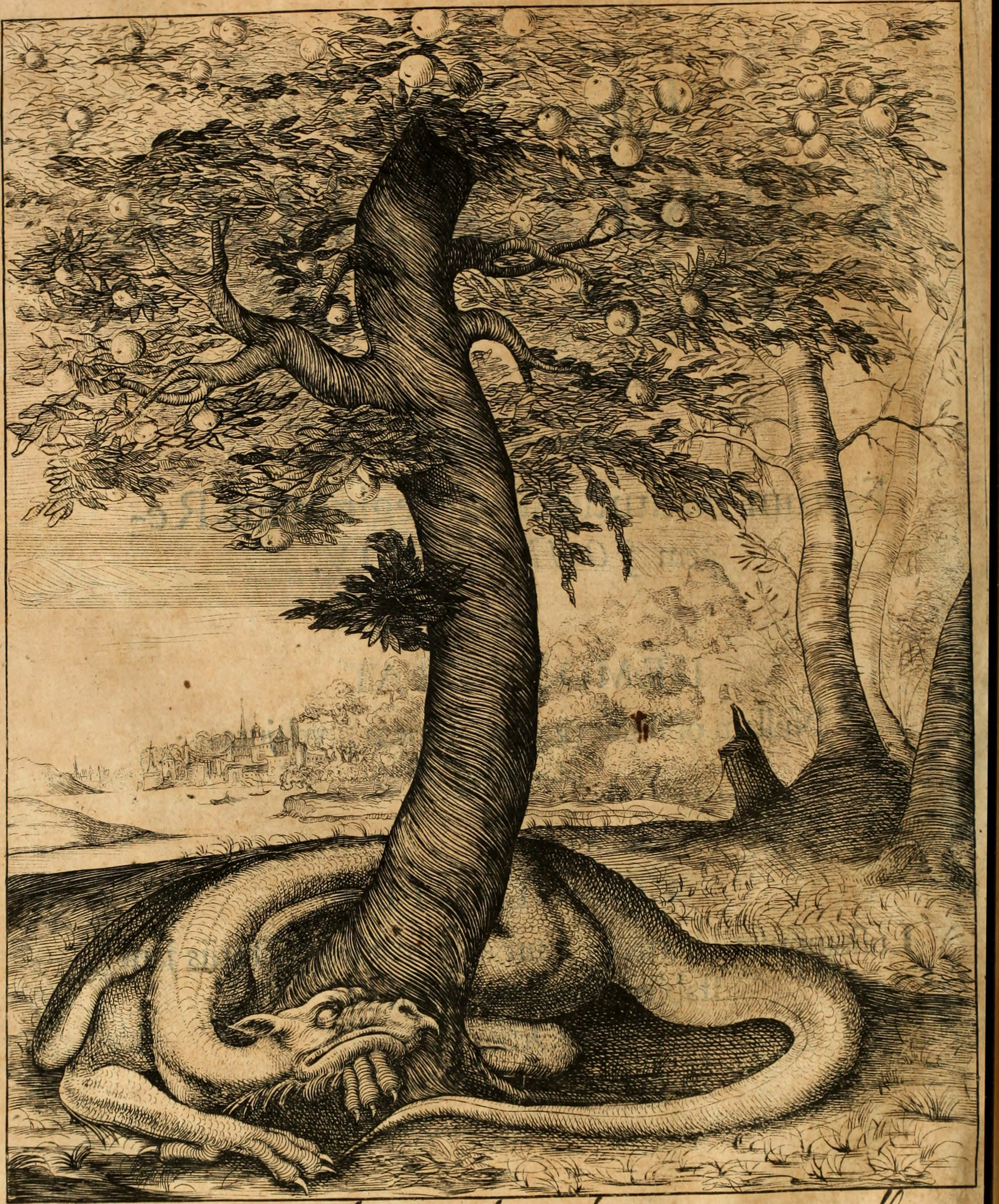
Wyvern, symbol of Portugal, keeping watch, pretending to sleep, while preparing its attack, Lusitania liberata ab injusto Castellanorum dominio, 1645.

Immediately after assuming the Portuguese throne, John IV took several steps to strengthen his position. On 11 December 1640, a "Council of War" was created to organize all of the operations. Next, the king created the "Junta of the Frontiers" to take care of the fortresses near the border, the hypothetical defense of Lisbon, and the garrisons and sea ports.

A year later, in December 1641, he created a tenancy to assure that all of the country's fortresses would be upgraded and that the improvements would be financed with regional taxes. He also organized the army, re-established the "Military Laws of King Sebastian", and undertook a diplomatic campaign focused on restoring good relations with England.

After gaining several small victories, John tried to make peace quickly. However, his demand that Philip recognize the new ruling dynasty in Portugal was not fulfilled until the reign of his son, Afonso VI, during the regency of Peter of Braganza, another of his sons, who later became King Peter II of Portugal). Confrontations with Spain lasted 28 years.

== Context: relations among the European powers ==
=== Relations between France and Spain ===
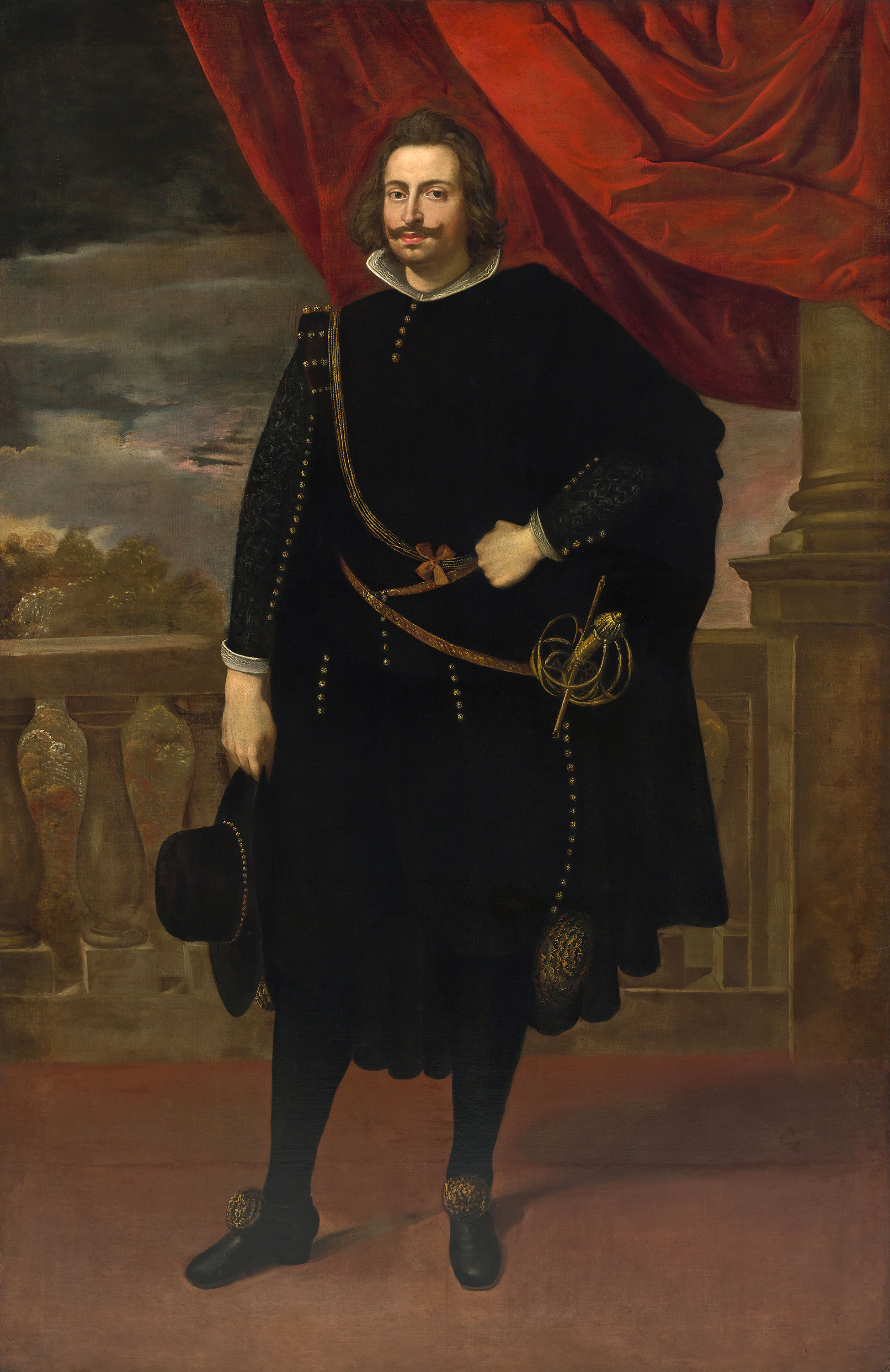
John II, Duke of Braganza, waged the Restoration War and was acclaimed King John IV.

Cardinal Richelieu, the chief adviser to Louis XIII, was fully aware of the fact that France was operating under strained circumstances. Louis was at war with Spain at that time; he had to control rebellions within France that were supported and financed by Madrid and had to send French armies to fight the Spanish Habsburgs on three different fronts. In addition to their shared frontier at the Pyrenees, Philip IV of Spain, formerly Philip III of Portugal as well, reigned, under various titles, in Flanders and the Franche-Comté, to the north and east of France. In addition, Philip IV controlled large territories in Italy, where he could, at will, impose a fourth front by attacking French-controlled Savoy. (Note: In Savoy, Christine Marie of France was acting as regent on behalf of her young son, Charles Emmanuel II, Duke of Savoy.)

Spain had enjoyed the reputation of having the most formidable military force in Europe, with the introduction of the arquebus and the so-called "Spanish School", but that reputation and tactic had diminished with the Thirty Years' War. Nevertheless, the consummate statesman, Richelieu, decided to force Philip IV to look to his own internal problems. To divert the Spanish troops besieging France, Louis XIII, on the advice of Richelieu, supported John's claim during the Acclamation War on the reasoning that a Portuguese war would drain Spanish resources and manpower.

=== Relations between Portugal and France ===
To fulfill the common foreign policy interests of Portugal and France, a treaty of alliance between the two countries was concluded at Paris on 1 June 1641. It lasted eighteen years before Richelieu's successor as unofficial foreign minister, Cardinal Mazarin, broke the treaty and abandoned his Portuguese and Catalan allies to sign a separate peace with Madrid. The Treaty of the Pyrenees was signed in 1659. Under its terms, France received the portion of the Principality of Catalonia north of the Pyrenees, known as the Roussillon, and part of the Cerdanya (French Cerdagne). Most important to the Portuguese, the French recognised Philip IV of Spain as the legitimate king of Portugal.

Seven years later, in the late stages of the Portuguese Restoration War, relations between the two countries thawed to the extent that the young (but sickly) Afonso VI of Portugal married a French princess, Marie Françoise of Nemours.

=== Relations between Portugal and the Dutch Republic ===
In 1580, Portugal came under the rule of King Philip II of Spain. At that time, the Dutch Republic was engaged in the Eighty Years' War (1568–1648) against Spain for independence. Trade between Portugal and the Dutch Republic stopped immediately.

Starting in 1598, the Dutch mercantile surrogates, the Dutch East India Company and the Dutch West India Company, repeatedly attacked Portugal's colonial possessions in the Americas, in Africa, in India, and in the Far East. This Dutch-Portuguese War was fought almost entirely overseas. Portugal was in a defensive posture throughout, and received very little military help from Spain. The Dutch seized half of Brazil, Elmina (in Ghana), and some Portuguese colonies in the East Indies.

At the time of the revolution in Lisbon (1 December 1640), Portugal had been at war with the Dutch Republic for forty years. Despite Portugal and the Dutch Republic now having a common enemy in Spain, the Dutch continued to attack Portuguese colonies, seizing Angola, São Tomé, and Malacca in 1641.

Portugal fought back, regaining Angola in 1648, São Tomé in 1649, and Brazil in 1654. The Dutch signed a European truce with Portugal, helping each other somewhat against their common enemy, Spain. The Dutch resumed buying salt in the Setúbal salt factories, restarting commerce between the two countries for the first time since 1580. However, Dutch attacks on Portuguese colonies persisted until 1663, even after the signing of the Treaty of The Hague (1661).

=== Relations between Portugal and England ===
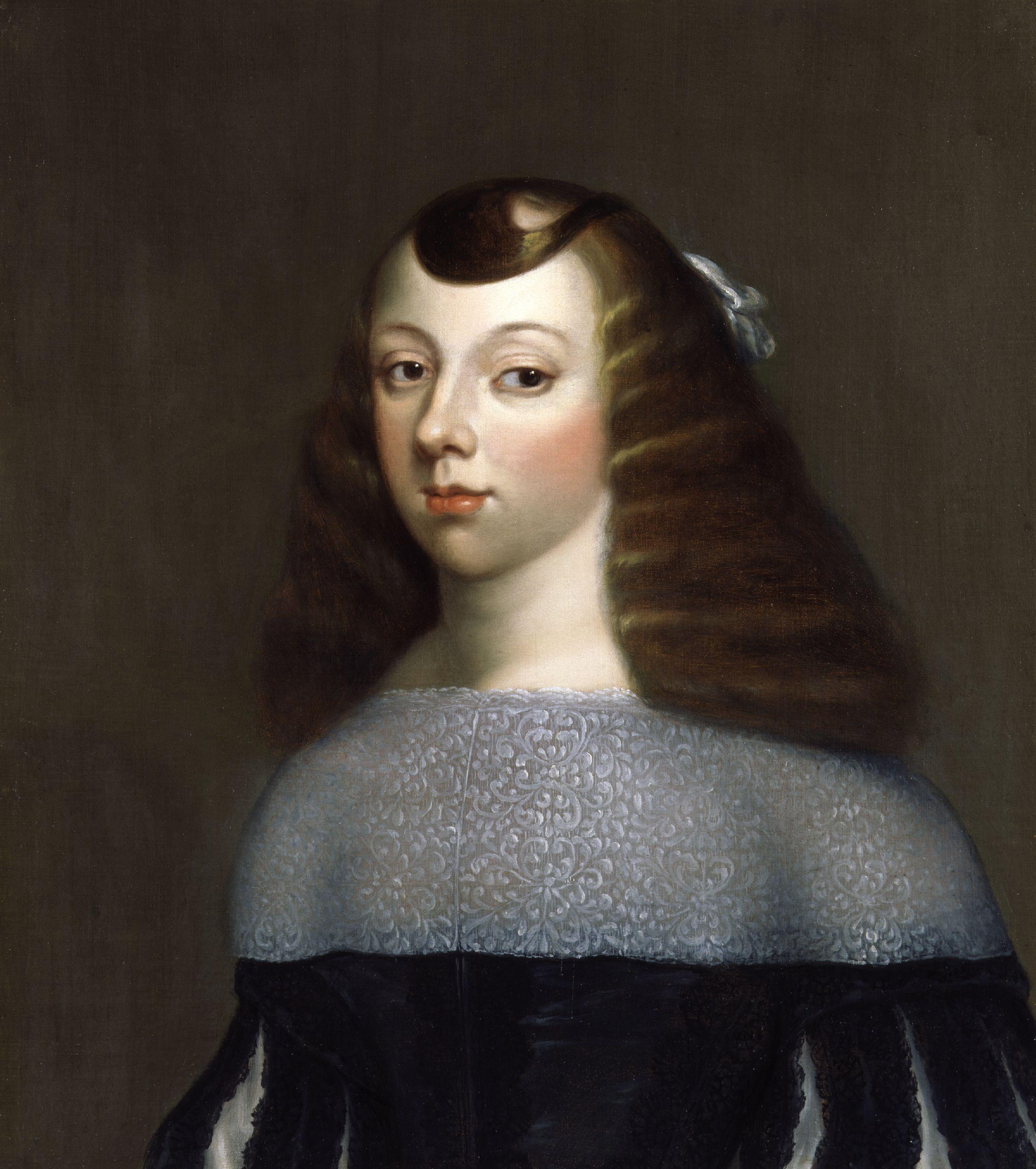
Catherine of Braganza before becoming Queen Consort of England, Scotland and Ireland, c. 1660–1661.

England was then embroiled in its own civil war. Portuguese problems in dealing with England arose from the fact that the English Parliament fought and won its anti-royalist war while, at the same time, Portugal's royal court continued to receive and recognize English princes and nobles. The strained relations persisted during the short-lived Commonwealth period, when the republican government that had deposed Charles I ruled England and then Ireland and Scotland.

After the restoration of the Stuart dynasty, it became possible for Portugal to compensate for the lack of French support by renewing its alliance with England, with experienced soldiers and officers available from the demobilised New Model Army. That took the form of a dynastic marriage in 1662 between Charles II and Afonso VI's sister, Catherine of Braganza, which assured Portugal of outside support in its conflict with Spain. The English alliance helped peace with Spain, which had been drained by the Thirty Years' War and had no stomach for further warfare with other European powers, especially a resurgent England.

== War ==

The Cross of the Order of Christ and the Cross of Burgundy were respectively the standards more used by the Portuguese and Spanish regiments in the battlefields.

Militarily, the Portuguese Restoration War consisted mainly of border skirmishes and cavalry raids to sack border towns, combined with occasional invasions and counter-invasions, many of them half-hearted and under-financed. There were only five major set-piece battles during twenty-eight years of hostilities.

The war may be considered to have had three periods:

- first, an early stage (1640–1646) when a few major engagements demonstrated that the Portuguese could not be easily returned to submission to the Spanish Habsburgs,
- second, a long period (1646–1660) of military standoffs, characterized by small-scale raiding, while Spain concentrated on its military commitments elsewhere in Europe,
- third, a final period (1660–1668) during which the Spanish king, Philip IV, unsuccessfully sought a decisive victory that would bring an end to hostilities.

=== First stage: battles ===
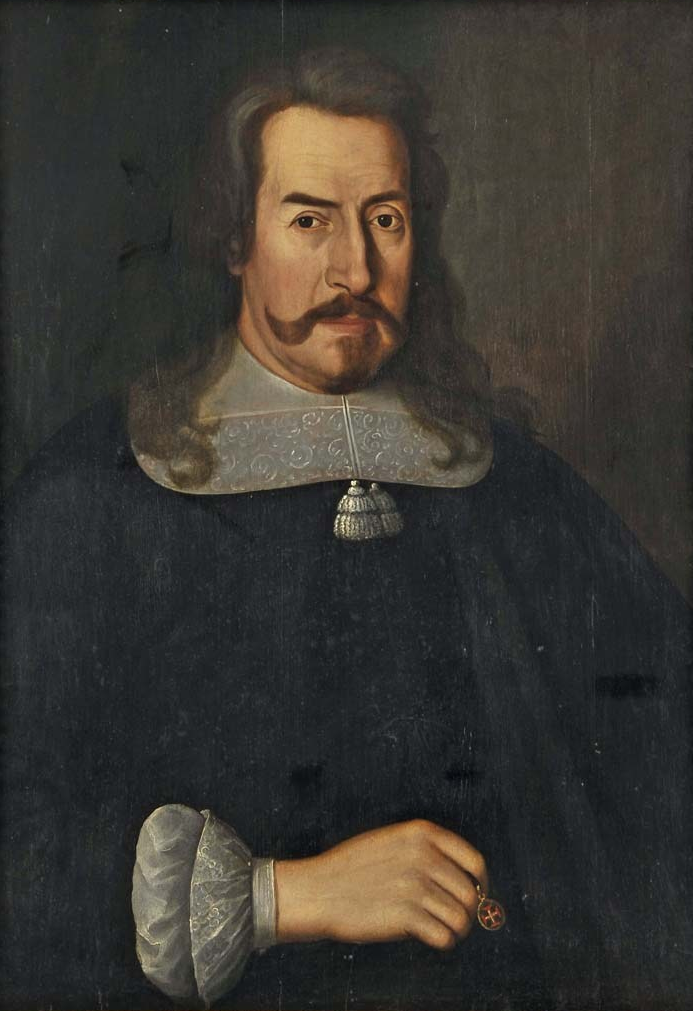
António Luís de Meneses, Marquis of Marialva, led victories at the Lines of Elvas.

Hoping for a quick victory in Portugal, Spain immediately committed seven regiments to the Portuguese frontier, but delays by the Count of Monterrey, a commander with more interest in the comforts of life at camp than the battlefield, squandered any immediate advantage. A Portuguese counter-thrust in late 1641 failed, and the conflict soon settled into a stalemate.

==== Battle of Montijo ====
On 26 May 1644, a large column of Spanish troops and mercenaries, commanded by Neapolitan Carlo Andrea Caracciolo, marquis of Torrecuso, was stopped at the Battle of Montijo by the Portuguese, who were led by the Matias de Albuquerque, one of a number of experienced Portuguese colonial officers who rose to prominence during the war.

==== Scope of the war ====
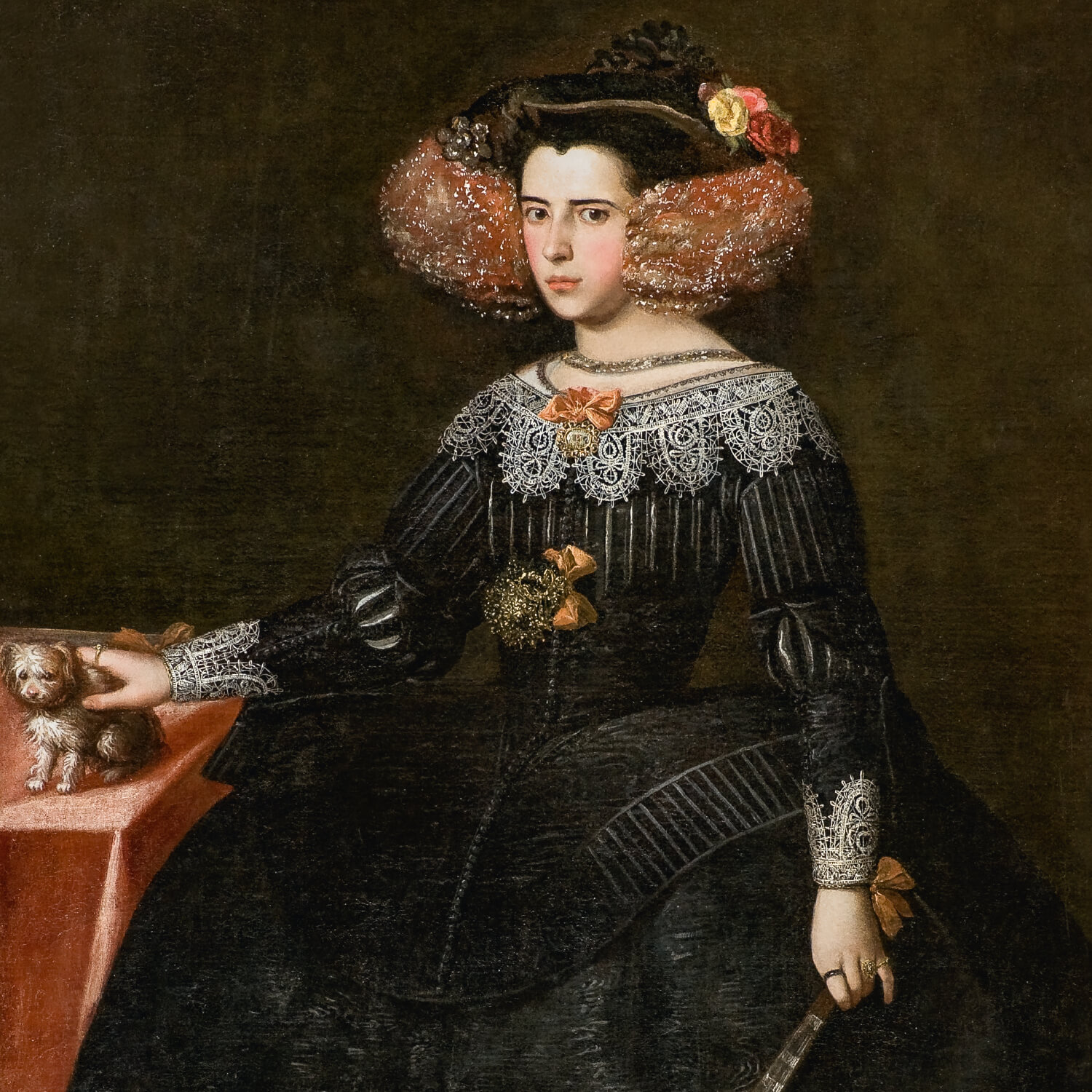
Luisa de Guzmán, Queen Consort of Portugal, previously Duchess of Braganza.

Three theaters of warfare were eventually opened, but most activity focused on the northern front, near Galicia, and on the central frontier between Portuguese Alentejo and Spanish Extremadura. The southern front, where the Portuguese Algarve abuts Spanish Andalusia, was a logical target for Portugal, but it was never the focus of a Portuguese attack, probably because the Portuguese queen, Luisa de Guzmán, was the sister of the Duke of Medina Sidonia, the leading noble of Andalusia.

==== Attrition and corruption ====
Spain, at first, made the war a defensive one. Portugal, for its part, felt no need to take Spanish territory in order to win, and it too was willing to make the war a defensive contest. Campaigns typically consisted of correrias (cavalry raids) to burn fields, sack towns, and steal large herds of enemy cattle and sheep. Soldiers and officers, many of them mercenaries, were primarily interested in booty and prone to desertion. For long periods, without men or money, neither side mounted formal campaigns, and when actions were taken, they were often driven as much by political considerations, such as Portugal's need to impress potential allies, as by clear military objectives. Year after year, given the problems of campaigning in the winter, and the heat and dry conditions of summer, most of the serious fighting was confined to two relatively short "campaigning seasons" in the spring and autumn.

The war settled into a pattern of mutual destruction. As early as December 1641, it was common to hear Spaniards throughout the country lament that "Extremadura is finished." Tax collectors, recruiting officers, billeted soldiers, and depredations by Spanish and foreign troops were loathed and feared by the Spanish population as much as raids by the enemy. In Extremadura, local militias bore the brunt of the fighting until 1659, and the absence of these part-time soldiers was extremely harmful to agriculture and local finances. Since there was often no money to pay or support the troops (or to reward their commanders), the Spanish crown turned a blind eye to the smuggling, contraband, profiteering, disorder, and destruction that had become rampant on the frontier. Similar conditions also existed among the Portuguese.

=== Second stage: defensive standoff ===
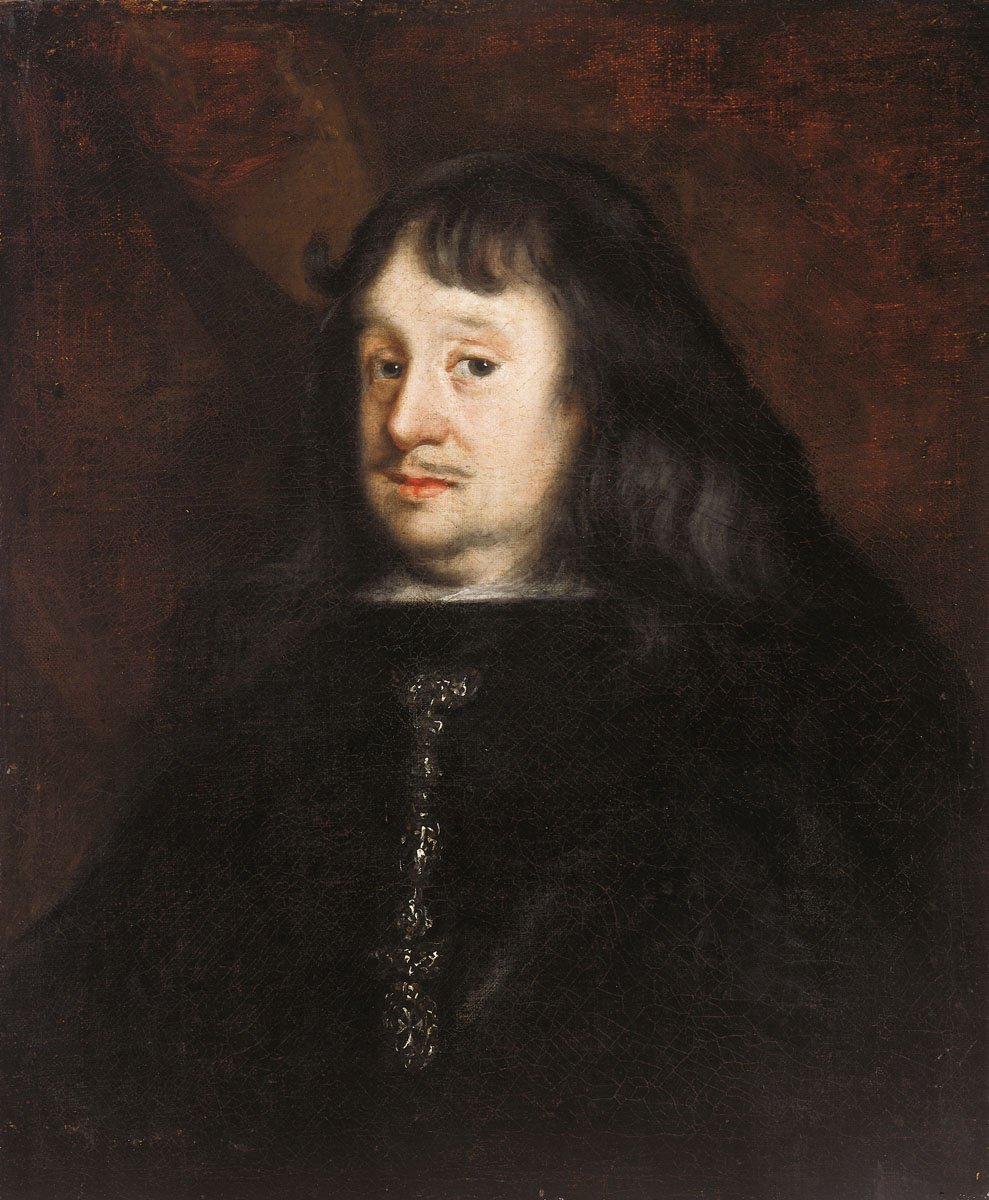
John of Austria was instrumental in leading the Habsburg forces.

The war was also expensive. In the 1650s, there were over 20,000 Spanish troops in Extremadura alone, compared to 27,000 in Flanders. Between 1649 and 1654, about 29 percent (over six million ducats) of Spanish defence spending was appropriated for fighting Portugal, a figure that rose during the major campaigns of the 1660s. Portugal was able to finance its war effort because of its ability to tax the spice trade with Asia and the sugar trade from Brazil, and it received some support from the European opponents of Spain, particularly France and England.

The 1650s were indecisive militarily but important on the political and diplomatic fronts, with the brief exception of the Battle of the Lines of Elvas in 1659. The death of John IV in 1656 signalled the beginning of the regency of his wife, followed by a succession crisis and a palace coup (1662). Despite these domestic problems, the expulsion of the Dutch from Brazil (1654) and the signing of a treaty with England (also in 1654) improved Portugal's diplomatic and financial position temporarily and gave it needed protection against a naval raid on Lisbon.

Nonetheless, the overriding goal, a formal pact with France, continued to evade Portugal, whose weakness and isolation had been driven home by its virtual exclusion at the negotiations for the European settlement-of-settlements, the new realpolitik of the Peace of Westphalia (1648).

With this treaty and the end of hostilities in Catalonia in 1652, Spain was again ready to direct its efforts against Portugal, but it faced a lack of men, resources, and, especially, good military commanders.

==== Atrocities ====
During the second stage, the war became a frontier confrontation characterized by attrition, often featuring local forces composed of familiar neighbors, yet this intimacy failed to temper the brutality exhibited by both sides. Soldiers and officers, many mercenaries facing payment shortages, turned to looting and desertion. The Portuguese sought retribution for grievances accumulated during sixty years of Spanish rule, whereas the Spanish viewed their adversaries not as legitimate combatants deserving of honorable treatment but as rebels.

=== Third stage: Portuguese victory ===
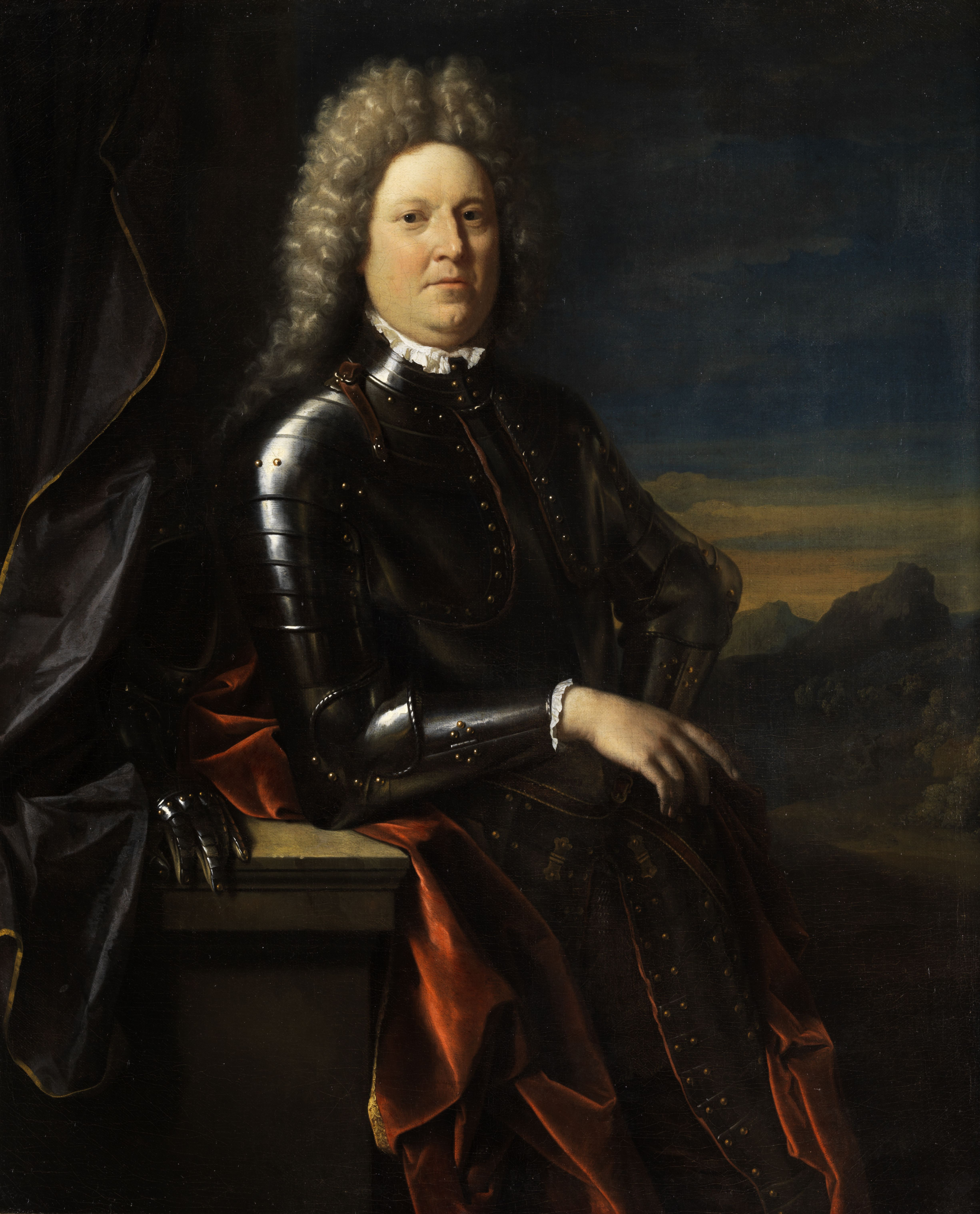
Frederico, Count of Mértola, who was in command of the English contingent brigade in Portugal

Following the indecisive campaigns of 1662, Spain launched a major effort to win the war. In April 1663, John of Austria the Younger, Philip IV's illegitimate son, invaded Alentejo, commanding an army of 20,000 provisioned for six weeks. In May, he successfully captured Évora, sparking a surge of emotion in Lisbon and raising alarm throughout Portugal, as there was now no major barrier to impede a Spanish advance on Lisbon.

The Portuguese, under António Luís de Meneses, 1st Marquess of Marialva, were bolstered by the arrival of a British brigade which numbered 3,000 in August 1662. Many were veterans of the English Civil War and the Dutch Revolt. For King Charles II, this was a convenient way of getting rid of demobilized soldiers of Cromwell's New Model Army and removing them from English territory. They were led by the German soldier of fortune, Friedrich Hermann von Schönberg, Count of Mértola, The brigade, under Schomberg's leadership, proved a decisive factor in winning back Portugal's independence.

They defeated the Spanish in a major engagement at Ameixial on 8 June 1663, and this forced John of Austria to abandon Évora and retreat across the border with heavy losses.

The Portuguese now had some 30,000 troops in the Alentejo-Extremadura theatre, but they could not draw the Spanish again into a major engagement until June 1665, when a new Spanish commander, the Marquis of Caracena, took over Vila Viçosa with about 23,000 men, including recruits from Germany and Italy.

The Portuguese relief column under António Luís de Meneses and Schomberg met them at Montes Claros on 17 June 1665. The Portuguese infantry and artillery emplacements broke the Spanish cavalry, and the Spanish force lost over 10,000 men, including casualties and prisoners. Shortly thereafter, the Portuguese retook Vila Viçosa. These were the last major engagements of the war.

Both sides returned to skirmishing campaigns. Portugal, with the intercession of its English ally, had sought a truce, but after the decisive Portuguese victory at Montes Claros and with the signing of a Franco-Portuguese treaty in 1667, the Spanish Habsburgs finally agreed to recognize the House of Braganza as Portugal's new ruling dynasty on 13 February 1668.

=== Recapitulation ===
The five major battles of the war were:

- Battle of Montijo on 26 May 1644
- Battle of the Lines of Elvas on 14 January 1659
- Battle of Ameixial on 8 June 1663
- Battle of Castelo Rodrigo on 7 July 1664
- Battle of Montes Claros on 17 June 1665

The Portuguese were victorious in almost all of these engagements, and peace was concluded, with the help of English mediation, by the Treaty of Lisbon in 1668.

== Timeline ==
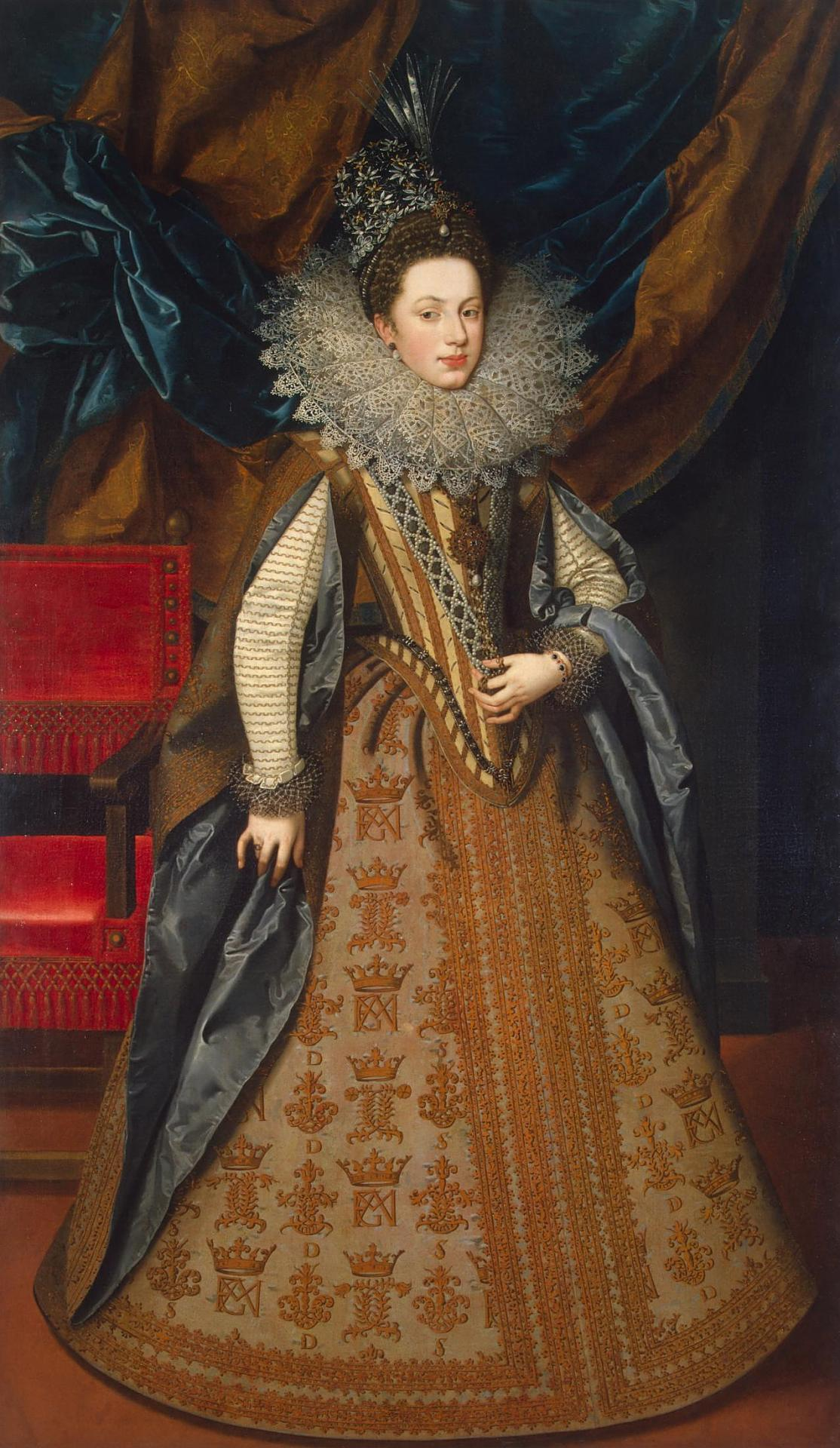
Margaret of Savoy, Vicereine of Portugal, Duchess of Mantua.

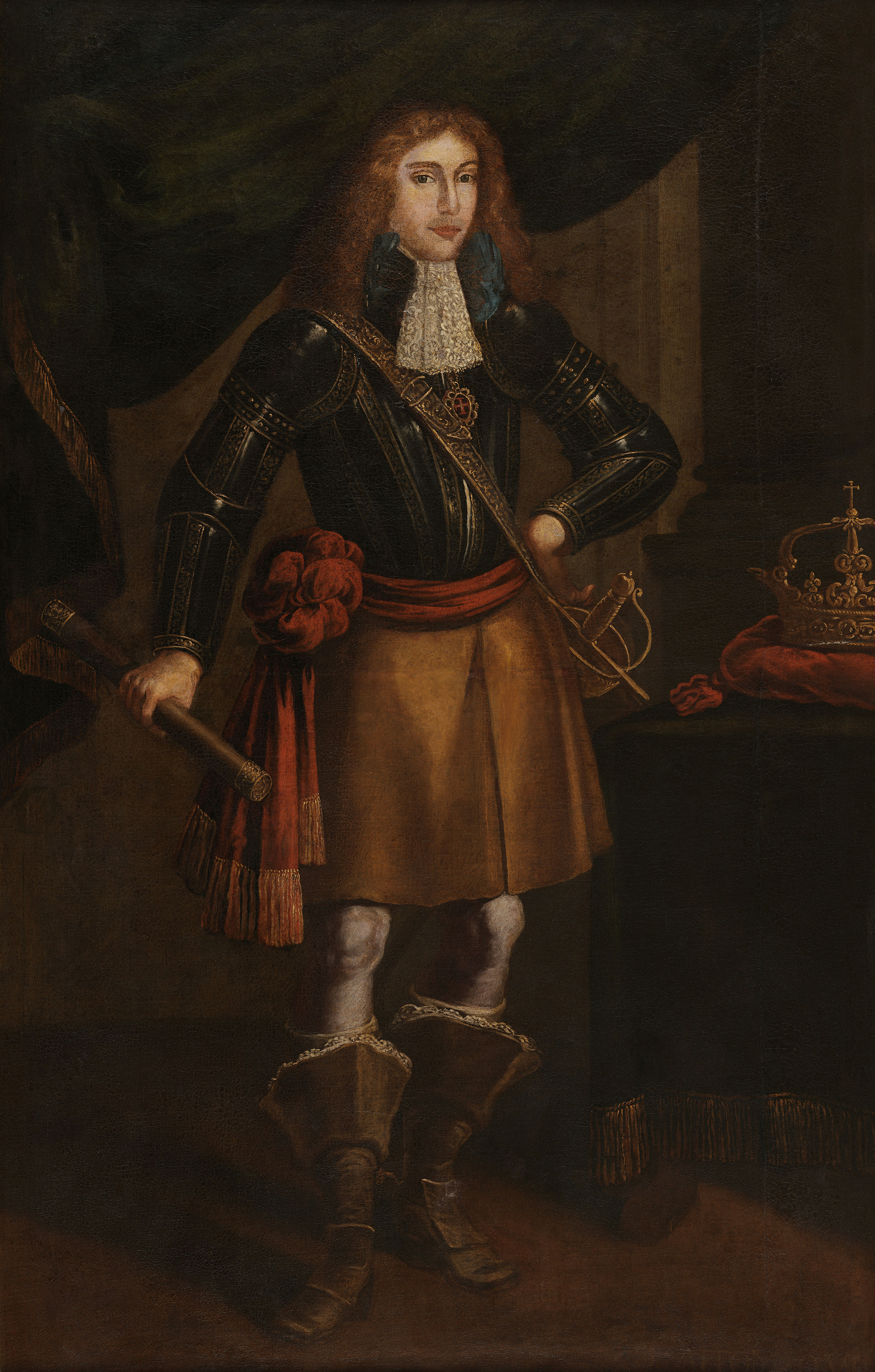
Afonso VI of Portugal's reign was managed by the Count of Castelo Melhor.

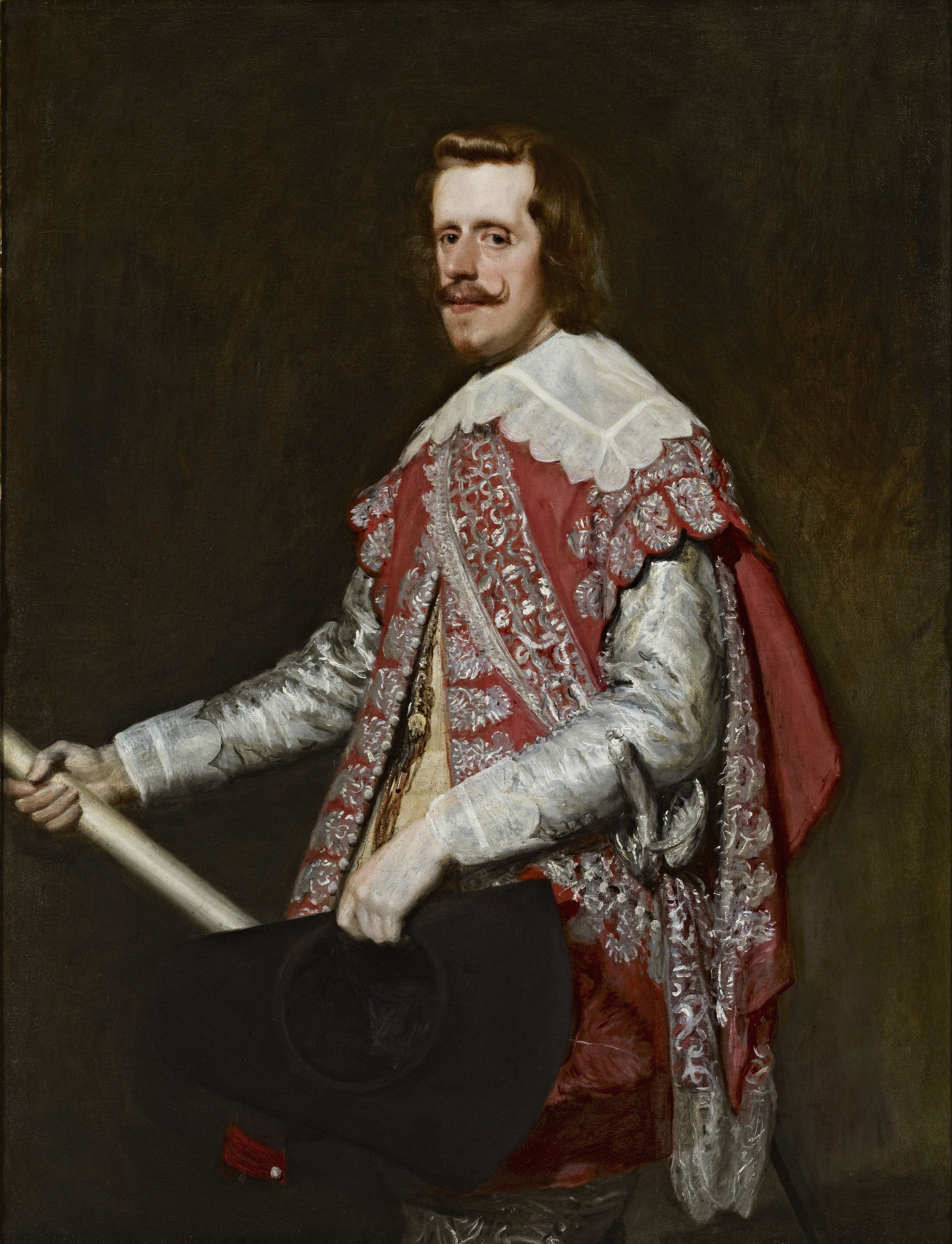
Philip III & IV of Portugal and Spain

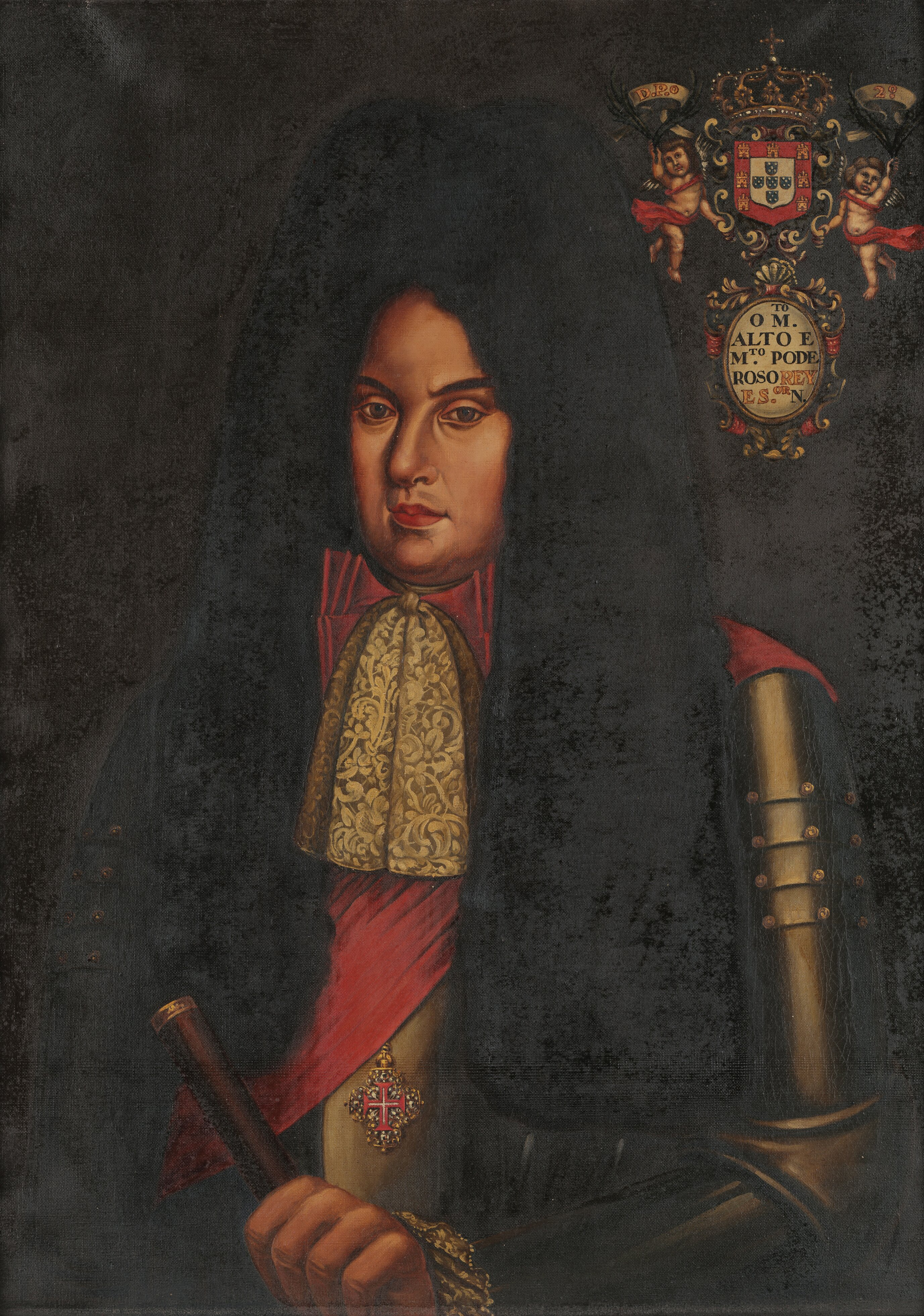
Prince Regent Pedro, Duke of Beja, future King Pedro II of Portugal.

- 1640: A small group of conspirators stormed the royal palace in Lisbon and deposed the Vicereine of Portugal, Margaret of Savoy on 1 December 1640. She famously tried to calm the Portuguese people during demonstrations in the Terreiro do Paço, at the time, Lisbon's main square, but her efforts failed. The Duke of Bragança, head of the senior family among the Portuguese nobility, accepted the throne as John IV of Portugal later the same day. John's entire reign was dominated by the struggle to maintain Portuguese independence.
- 1641: A counter-revolution mounted by the Inquisition failed. It was quelled by Francisco de Lucena, who had its leaders executed. Miguel Luís de Menezes, 2nd Duke of Caminha, was executed for continuing to support the Habsburgs' claim to the Portuguese throne.
- 1641: Portugal signed alliances with France (1 June 1641) and Sweden (August 1641).
- 1641: Portugal and the Dutch Republic signed a 'Treaty of Offensive and Defensive Alliance', otherwise known as the Treaty of The Hague, on 12 June 1641. The treaty was not respected by either party; as a consequence, it had no effect on the Portuguese dependencies of Brazil and Angola that were under Dutch occupation.
- 1641: The Dutch began their occupation of São Tomé and of Ano Bom on 16 October 1641, where they remained until 6 January 1649. This was clearly a violation of the agreement made with Portugal only three months earlier.
- 1641: Portugal was ousted from Malacca by the Dutch.
- 1642: The Dutch took over all of the Portuguese Gold Coast (now Ghana).
- 1643: At the Battle of Rocroi (19 May 1643), in the Ardennes, the French defeated the Spanish.
- 1644: The Battle of Montijo near Badajoz, between the Portuguese and the Spanish, was fought on 26 May 1644.
- 1644: The Portuguese city of Elvas withstood a nine-day siege by Spanish troops.
- 1648: Portuguese troops from the colony of Brazil under Salvador Correia de Sá landed in Angola, retook Luanda, and expelled the Dutch, thereby restoring the African colony to Portugal.
- 1649: The Dutch were ousted from São Tomé.
- 1650: The Sultan of Oman, allied with the Dutch, captured Muscat, which had been a Portuguese trading outpost on the Arabian Peninsula.
- 1654: The Anglo-Portuguese treaty between John IV and Oliver Cromwell was signed at Westminster. John agreed to prevent the molestation of English traders in Portugal and its possessions and to allow them to use their own bible and to bury their dead according to Protestant rites even though they were on Catholic soil.
- 1654: Portuguese troops from the colony of Brazil drove the Dutch out of the great plantation colonies of northeastern Brazil, re-establishing the territorial integrity of Portugal's South American holdings.
- 1656: Portugal lost control of Colombo in Portuguese Ceylon to the Dutch.
- 1656: John IV died on 6 November 1656 after a reign of 15 years. His queen, who was born Luisa de Guzman (1613–1666), the eldest daughter of the Spanish grandee, the Duke of Medina-Sidonia, then reigned as regent for their son, Afonso VI of Portugal. She began seeking an accommodation with Spain.
- 1658: The Dutch took Jaffnapatam, Portugal's last colony in Ceylon.
- 1659: The Battle of the Lines of Elvas was fought on 14 January 1659. Portuguese troops, under the command of the marquis of Marialva, António Luís de Meneses, and Sancho Manoel de Vilhena, scored a resounding victory over the Spanish.
- 1659: The Spanish besieged the Portuguese town of Monção. The town fell on 7 February.
- 1659: The Treaty of the Pyrenees was signed on 7 November 1659, ending Spain's long war with France, and Spanish troops were free once more to suppress the Portuguese 'rebellion'. The Spaniards besieged Elvas, and they were driven off by António Luís de Meneses once again.
- 1660: Upon the restoration of Charles II in England, the Queen-Regent re-negotiated the treaty of 1654. Portugal was allowed to recruit soldiers and horses in England for the fight against Spain, to seek the conscription of 4,000 mercenaries in Scotland and Ireland, and to charter 24 English ships to carry them. The expeditionary force was issued English weapons upon arrival in Portugal and guaranteed freedom of worship.
- 1660: The English began to dominate the trade in port wine from Portugal after a political spat with the French denied them Bordeaux wines. Brandy was added to the Portuguese wines to fortify them for the Atlantic voyage. Together with the restoration of Charles II in England, the "port connection" had an increasingly positive influence on Anglo-Portuguese relations.
- 1661: Bombay and Tangier were ceded to England on 23 June 1661 as a dowry for Afonso's sister, Catherine of Braganza, who had married King Charles II of England on 25 May 1661. In addition to the deeds to Bombay and Tangier, Catherine arrived in London, where she popularized the practice of drinking tea, with a dowry of two million gold pieces. Servicing this wedding debt burdened the Portuguese exchequer for the next half-century. The marriage with a Protestant monarch was deeply unpopular with those among the Portuguese nobility who favoured alliance with France. An anglophile party and a francophile party developed at the Portuguese court.
- 1661: English mediation induced the Netherlands to acknowledge, on 6 August 1661, Portuguese rule in Brazil, in return for uncontested control of Ceylon and eight million guilders. This agreement was formalized in the Treaty of The Hague (1661).
- 1662: Shortly after Afonso VI's coming-of-age, Luís de Vasconcelos e Sousa, 3rd Count of Castelo Melhor, saw an opportunity to gain power at court by befriending the mentally deficient king. He managed to convince the king that his mother, Luisa of Medina-Sidonia, was plotting to steal his throne and exile him from Portugal. As a result, Afonso asserted his right to rule and dispatched his mother to a convent. The king appointed Castelo Melhor his secret notary (escrivão da puridade), a position in which Castelo Melhor was able to exercise the functions of first minister. Because of the weakness of the king, Castelo Melhor became the virtual "dictator of Portugal".
- 1662: Castelo Melhor commenced the final (successful) phase of the Portuguese Acclamation War with the aid of the Count of Mértola, who brilliantly commanded the international mercenary army that had been assembled with the assistance of England.
- 1663: The Battle of Ameixial was fought on 8 June 1663. After they had spent nearly all spring overrunning the south of Portugal, the Spanish army, under John of Austria the Younger, took the Portuguese city of Évora. Less than three weeks later, they were soundly defeated by Sancho Manoel de Vilhena and Count of Mértola.
- 1663: The Dutch ousted the Portuguese from the Malabar coast, even though this was a clear violation of their 1661 treaty.
- 1663: The Siege of Évora occurred when the Portuguese army led by Sancho Manoel de Vilhena and by the Count of Mértola retook the city from the Spanish occupiers, with little to no casualties. The entire Spanish garrison surrendered.
- 1664: The Battle of Castelo Rodrigo was fought on 7 July 1664. A regional military commander, Pedro Jacques de Magalhães, defeated the Duke of Osuna.
- 1664: The Siege of Valencia de Alcántara results in the successful conquest of the Spanish town of Valencia de Alcántara by Portugal in July 1664.
- 1665: Portugal was again victorious at the Battle of Montes Claros (on 17 June 1665), in which António Luís de Meneses and Schomberg defeated the Spanish army under the Marquis of Caracena; Spain ceased hostilities, but a true peace treaty was not signed for another three years. Montes Claros is considered one of the most important battles in Portuguese history.
- 1666: In an attempt to establish an alliance with France, Castelo Melhor arranged for Afonso VI to marry Marie Françoise of Nemours, the daughter of the Duke of Nemours, but this marriage would not last long.
- 1666: The ambitious Castelo Melhor planned to prosecute the war to the extent of taking Galicia and presenting it to the Portuguese crown as a war indemnity, but he was dissuaded.
- 1667: Marie Françoise petitioned for an annulment of her marriage to Afonso VI, based on the impotence of the king. The Church granted her the annulment.
- 1667: King Afonso VI, Castelo Melhor, and his francophile party were overthrown by the king's younger brother, Pedro, Duke of Beja, (who later ruled as Pedro II of Portugal.) Pedro first installed himself as his brother's regent and then arranged Afonso's exile to the island of Terceira in the Azores on the pretense that he was incapable of governing. Castelo Melhor fled into exile; ironically, he chose to live in England.
- 1667: The French alliance had been imperilled by the annulment of Afonso's marriage, but Pedro strengthened his political position by marrying his brother's estranged queen.
- 1668: The Treaty of Lisbon with Spain ended 28 years of war. The regent of Spain, Mariana of Austria, acting in the name of her young son Charles II of Spain, finally recognized the legitimacy of the Portuguese monarch. Portugal kept all of its remaining overseas colonies, with the exception of Ceuta on the north African coast, which didn't recognize the Braganza Dynasty during the war.

== Results of the war ==
For Portugal, its restoration of independence from Spain was clearly established, and it proved that it could fend for itself, albeit with difficulty. Its victories on the battlefield had re-awakened Portuguese nationalism.

Economically, Portugal's restoration of independence freed it to pursue the course mapped out by the pioneers of commercial imperialism. During the 17th century, its economy depended largely upon entrepôt trade in tobacco and sugar, and the export of salt. During the 18th century, even though staples were not abandoned, the Portuguese economy came to be based more upon enslaved people, gold, leather, and wine. Portuguese trade, centered in the busy port of Lisbon, was most influenced by Anglo-Dutch capitalism and by the colonial economy in Brazil.

Luís de Meneses, the Count of Ericeira, economic adviser to the prince regent, advocated the development of a native textile industry based on a Flemish model. Factories were established at Covilhã, in an area of central Portugal where there was easy access to flocks of sheep and clean mountain water, but they were highly unpopular with both local consumers and traditional weavers. Meanwhile, Portuguese attempts to develop a silk industry were undercut by the French, who wanted to monopolize that market.

More importantly, after 1668, Portugal increasingly cultivated intellectual ties with Western Europe, especially France and England, marking a shift away from its Iberian roots and towards cultural and political independence from Spain. Fear of Spanish invasion remained a powerful tool in reinforcing Portuguese nationalism and fueling hostility towards Spain and anything perceived as Spanish, as independence became synonymous with resistance against Castilian influence.

Macau, the Portuguese colony in the Far East, remained loyal to the Portuguese monarch during the entire occupation period. Thus it was awarded the title "Cidade do Nome de Deus, Macau, Não Há Outra Mais Leal", or "City by the Name of God, Macau, There is None More Loyal" by King John IV of Portugal in 1654.

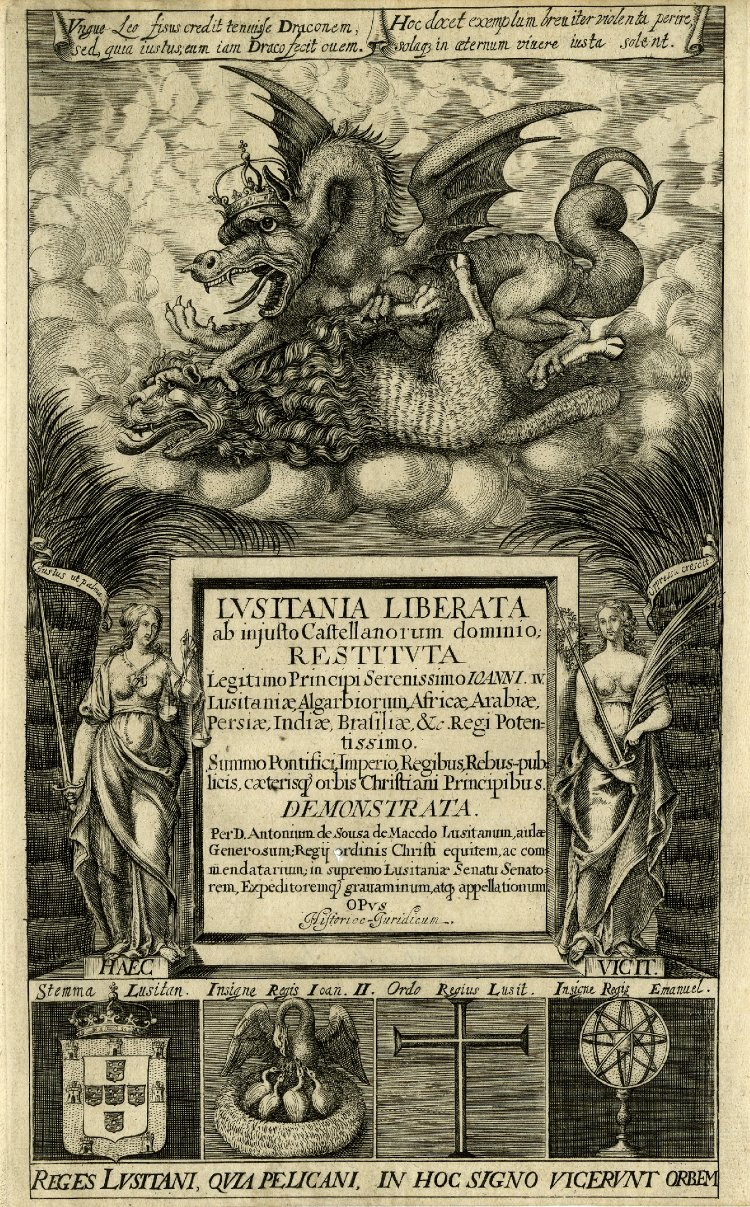
A 1645 depiction of a wyvern, symbol of Portugal, defeating a Spanish lion, in an allegory of the Portuguese victory of the war.

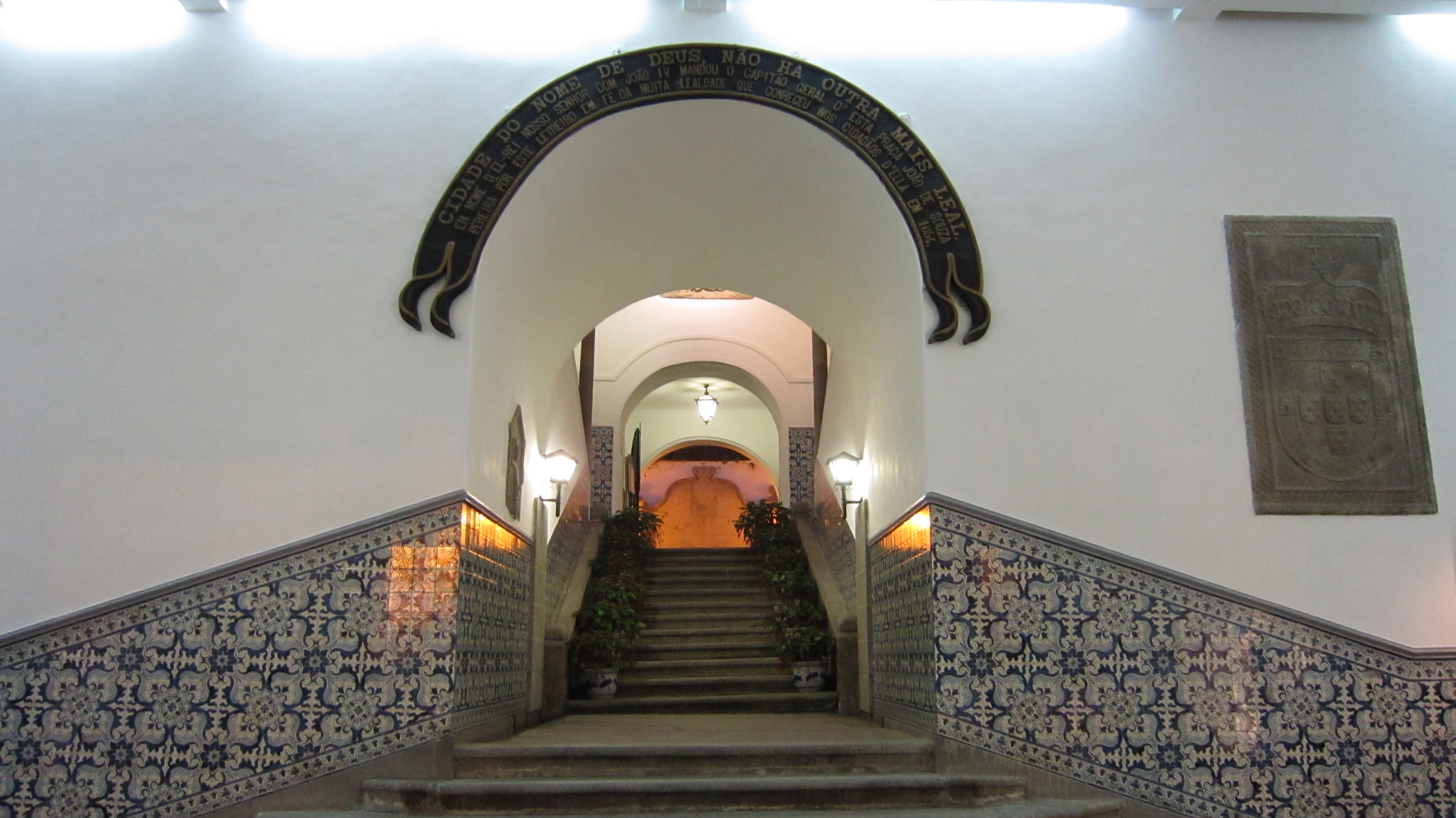
Staircase inside the Leal Senado Building in Macau, with a plaque in which the city's name, title and honours are inscribed.

== See also ==
- 1580 Portuguese succession crisis
- Monument to the Restorers
- Restauradores Square
- Anglo-Spanish Wars
- Franco-Spanish Wars
