= Oñate =

Oñate may refer to:

- Oñati, a town in Gipuzkoa, Spain
- Oñate (surname), a surname (including a list of people with the name)
- Juan de Oñate (1550–1626), Spanish conquistador and colonial governor of New Mexico
- Íñigo Vélez de Guevara, 7th Count of Oñate (1566–1644), Spanish politician
- Íñigo Vélez de Guevara, 8th Count of Oñate (1597–1658), Spanish politician
- Íñigo Vélez de Guevara, 10th Count of Oñate (1642–1699), Spanish nobleman
