= San Ferdinando (disambiguation) =

San Ferdinando may refer to:

- San Ferdinando, comune in the Province of Reggio Calabria in the Italian region Calabria
- San Ferdinando, southern district of Naples
- San Ferdinando di Puglia, town and comune in the Province of Barletta-Andria-Trani in the Apulia region of southeast Italy

== Churches ==
- San Ferdinando, Livorno, a Baroque style, Roman Catholic church in Livorno, region of Tuscany, Italy
- San Ferdinando (church), Naples, church in central Naples, Italy
