= List of fountains in Naples =

This is a list of the notable fountains in Naples, Italy. Naples has about sixty historical fountains and hundreds of smaller fountains.

== Some fountains in Naples ==
- Fontana del Carciofo
- Fontana del Formiello
- Fontana del Gigante
- Fountain of Monteoliveto
- Fountain of Neptune
- Fontana del Sebeto
- Fontana della Sellaria
- Fountain of the Spinacorona
- Fontana dell'Esedra
- Fontana di Santa Lucia
- Fontana di Monteoliveto
- Fontana della Tazza di Porfido
- Fontana del Formiello
- Fontana del Belvedere
- Fontana della Sellaria
- Fontana della Sirena Parthenope
- Fontana della Duchessa
- Fontana Gruppo Europa
- Fontana del Leone
- Fontana del Cortile delle Carozze
- Fontana del Capone
- Fontana degli Incanti
- Fontana del Capo Posillipo
- Fontane Diaz
- Fontana obelischi
- Fontana di Oreste ed Elettra
- Fontana di Castore e Polluce
- Fontana del Ratto delle Sabine
- Fontana del Marinaretto
- Fontana della Scapigliata
- Fontana della Maruzza
- Fontana del Tritone
- Fontana della Flora Capitolina
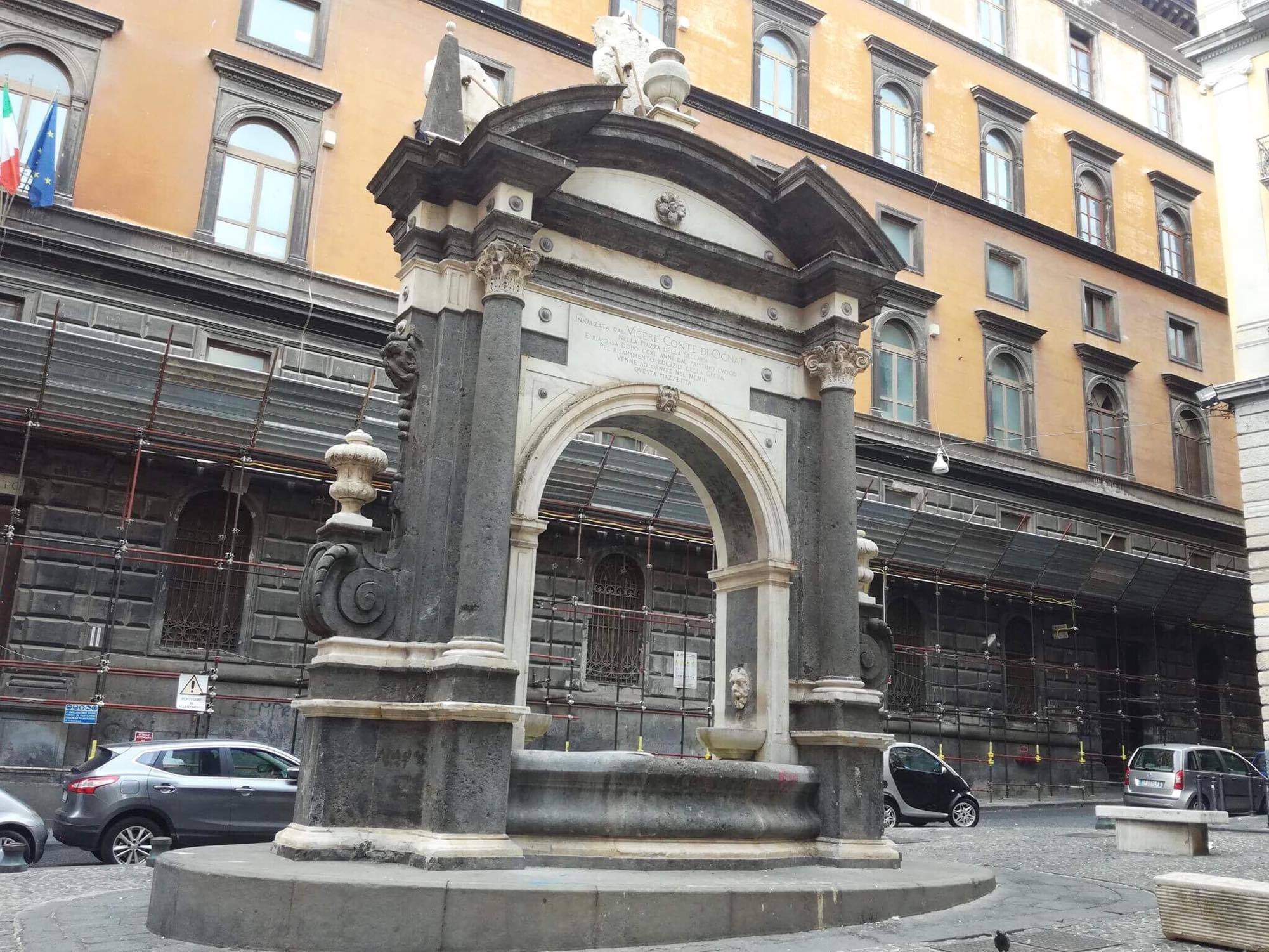
Sellaria fountain

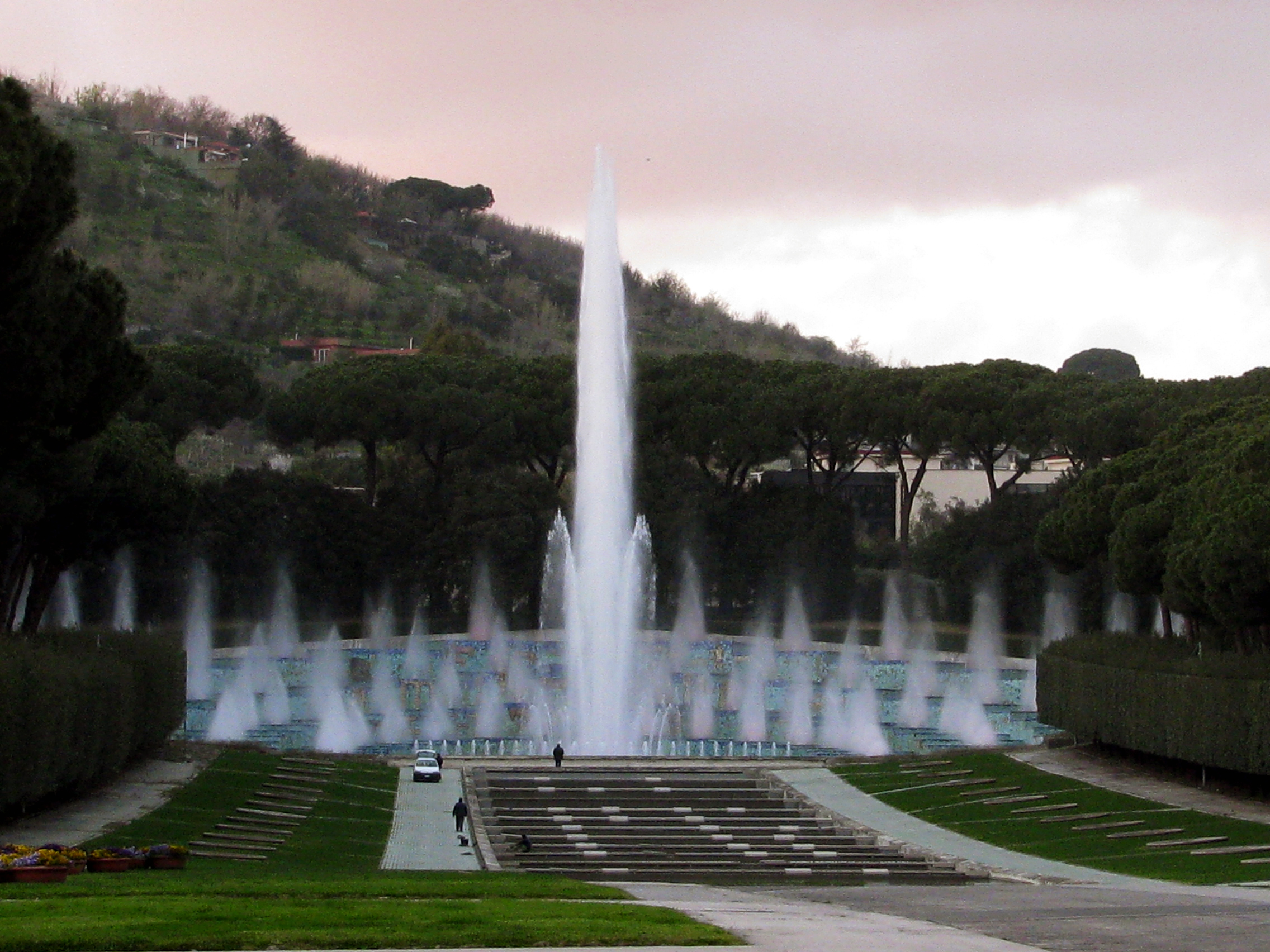
Esedra fountain

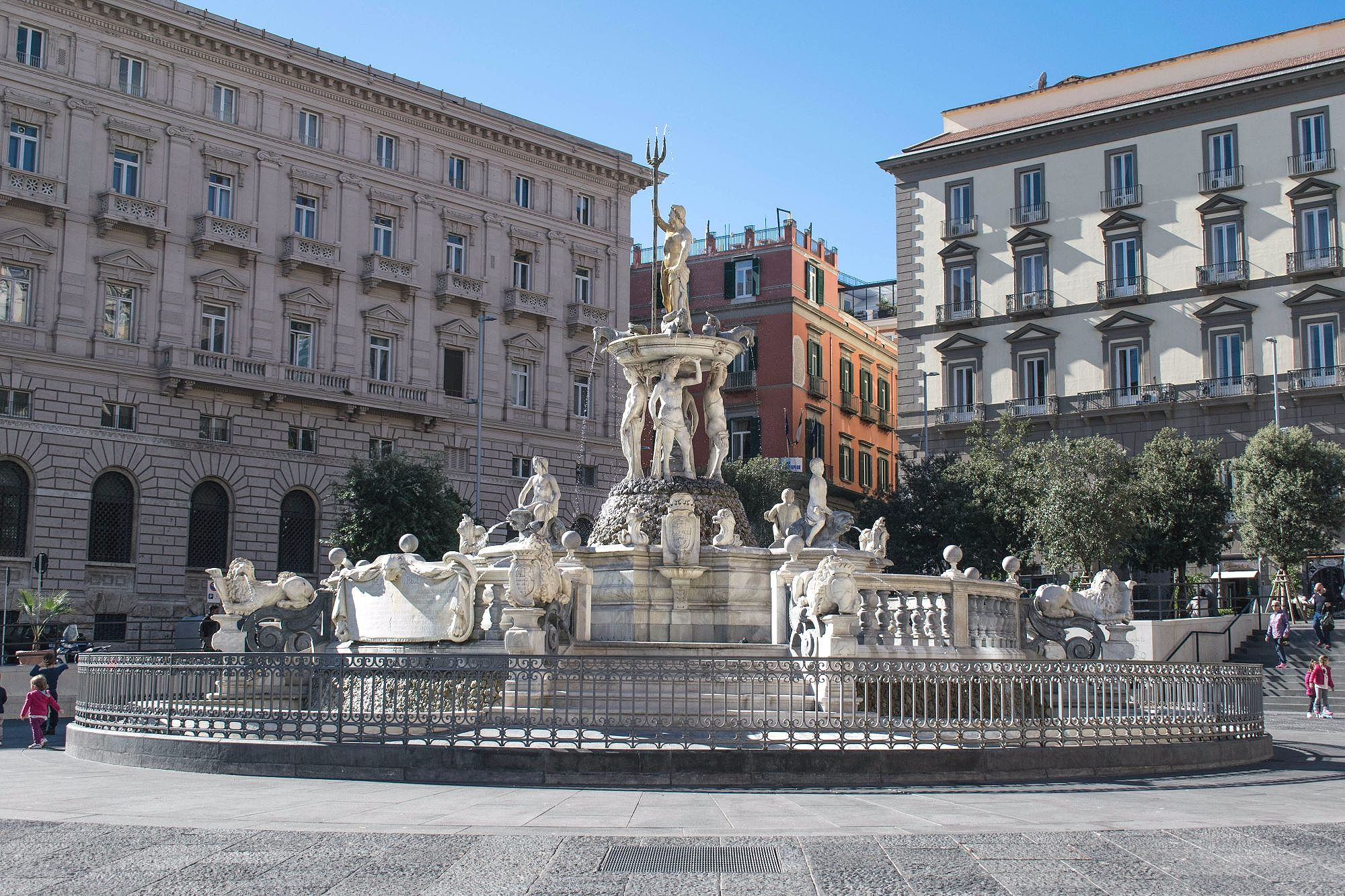
Neptune fountain

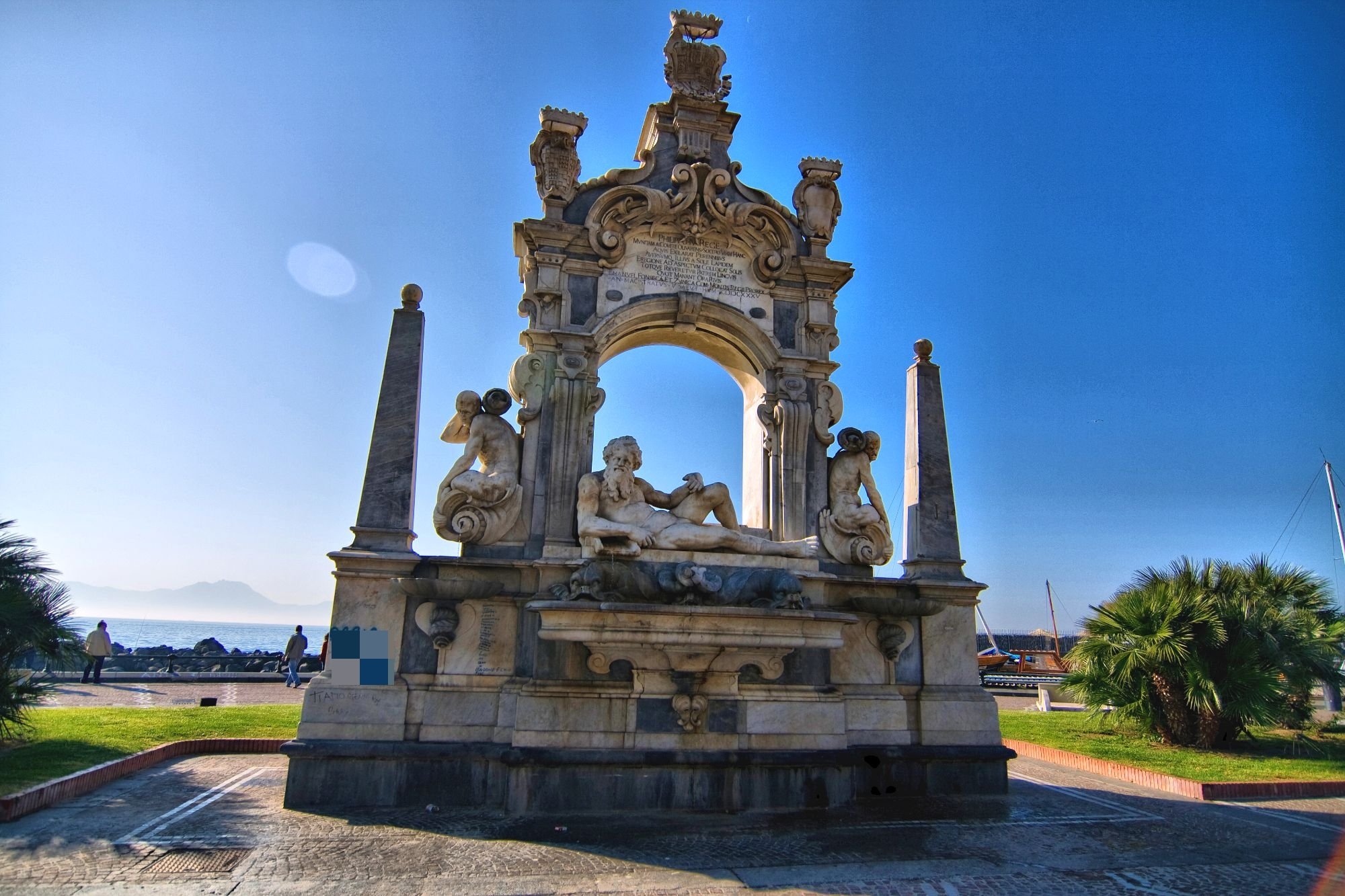
Sebeto fountain

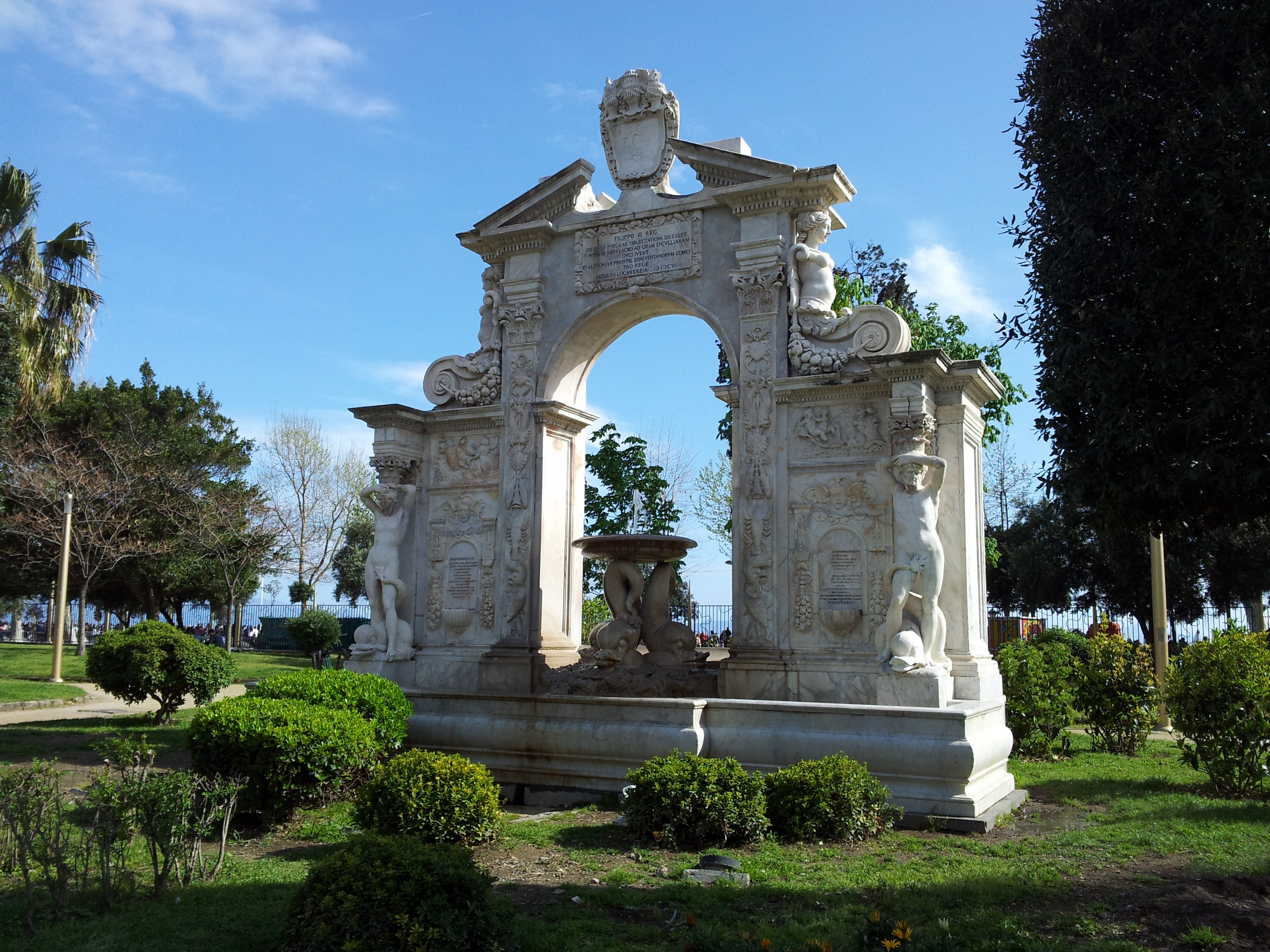
Santa Lucia fountain

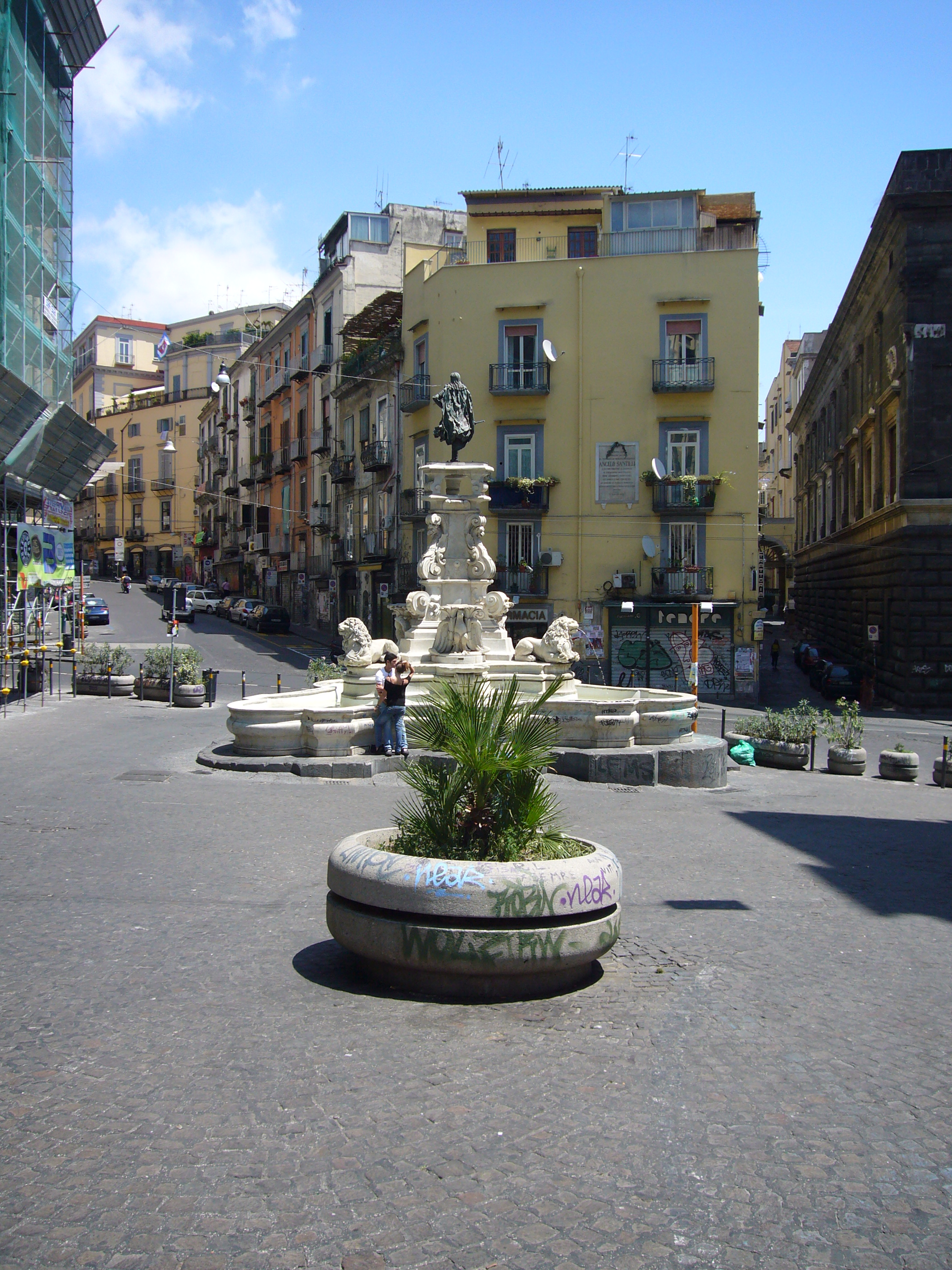
Monteoliveto fountain

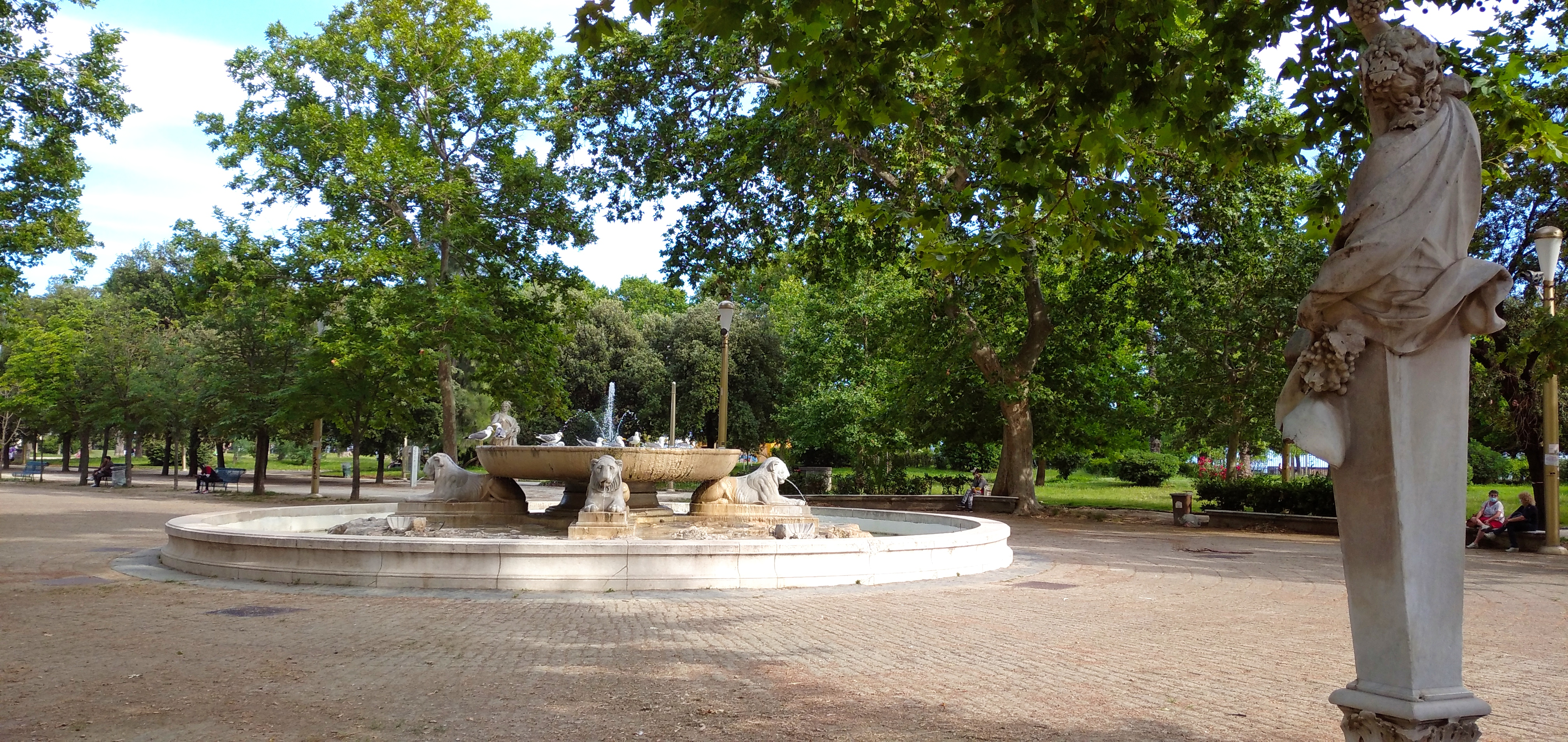
Tazza di Porfido fountain

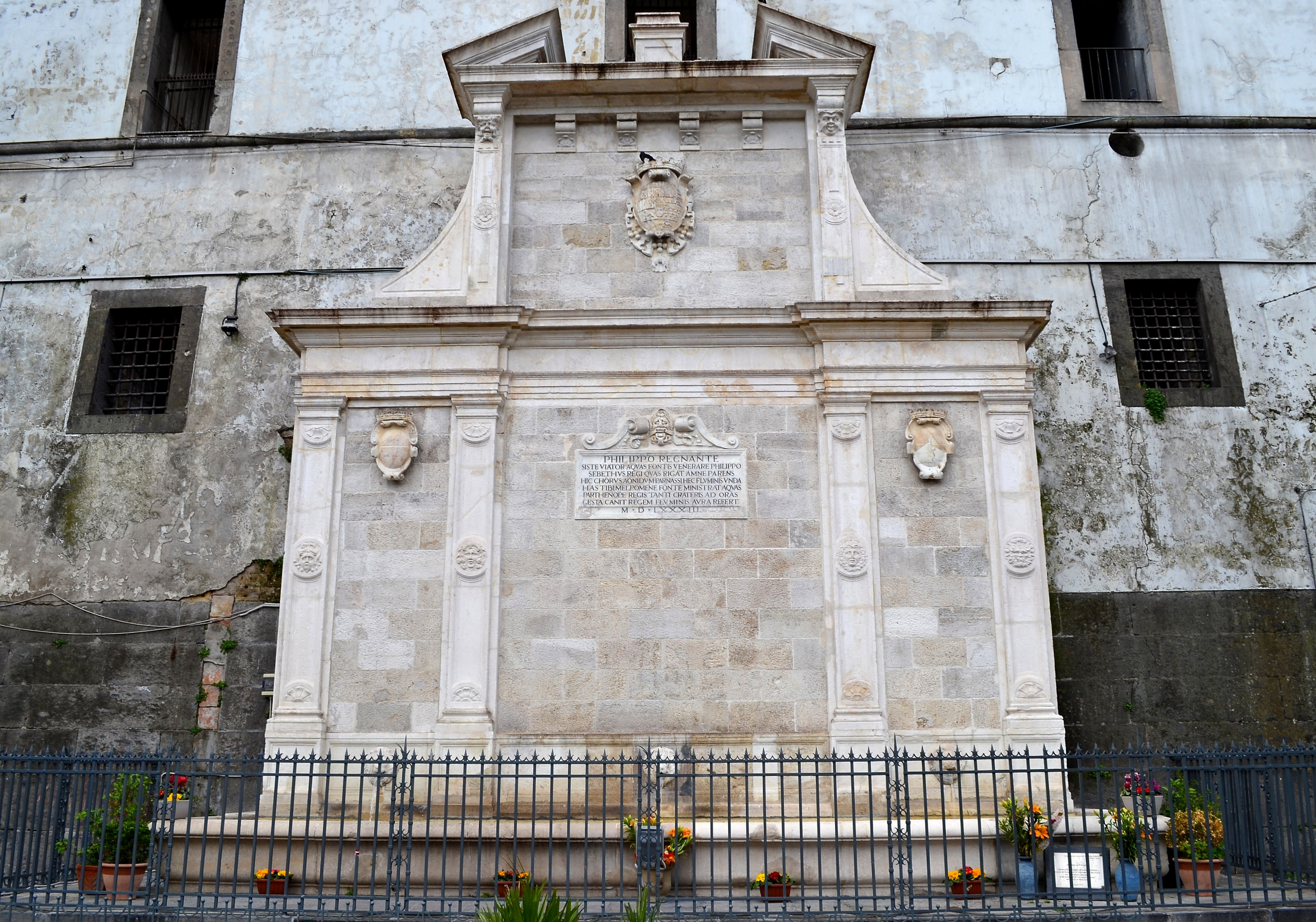
Formiello fountain

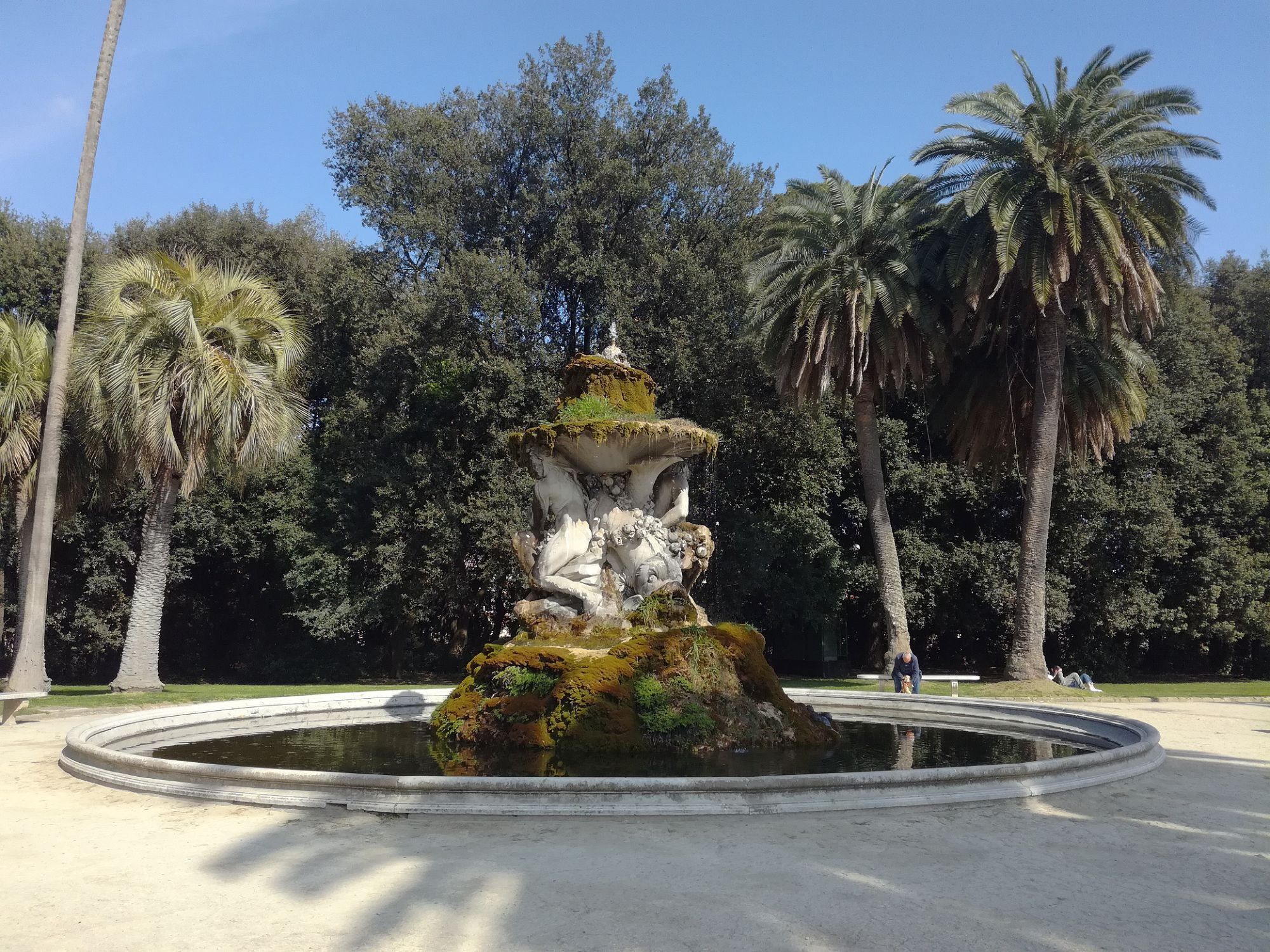
Belvedere fountain

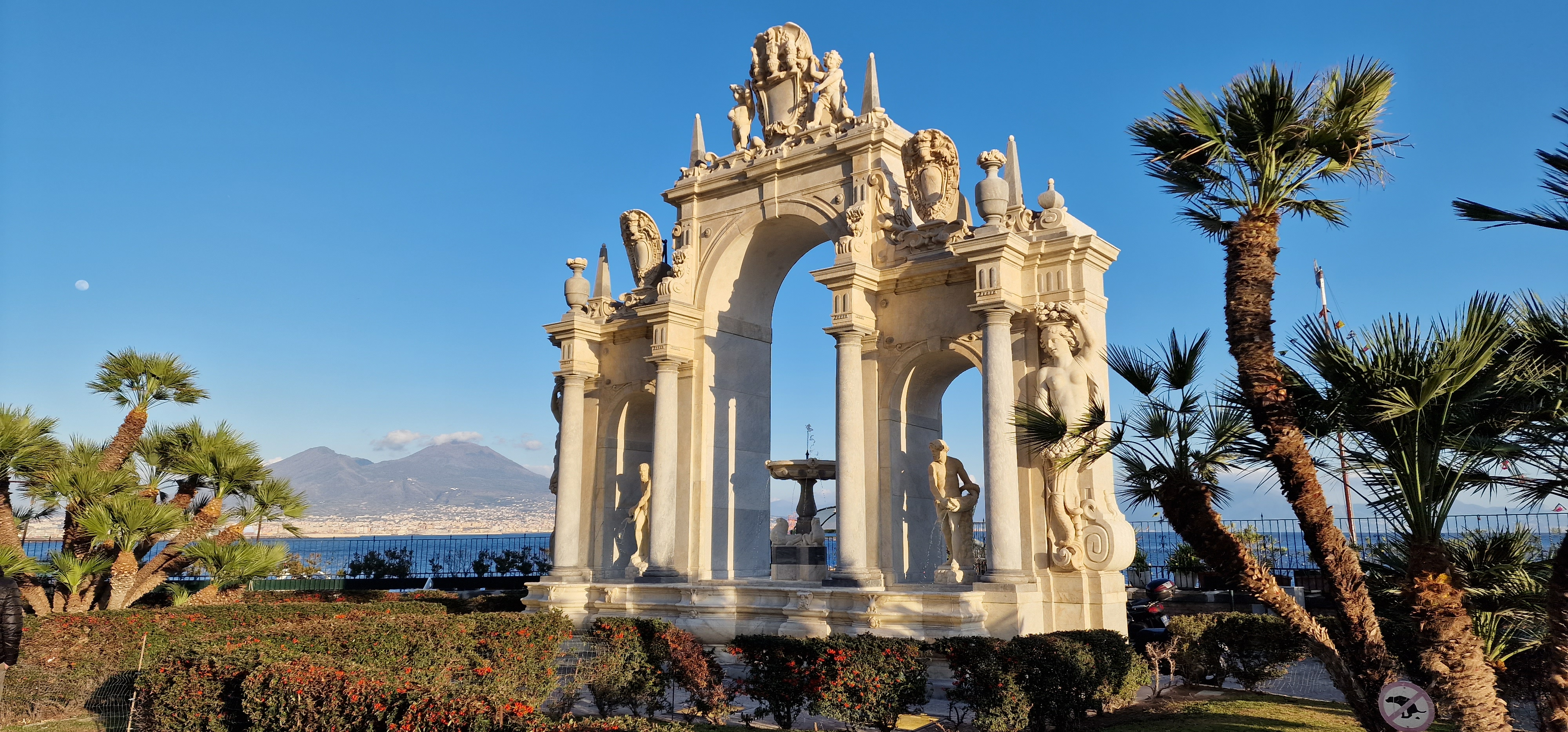
Fontana del Gigante

=== Fountains in palaces, villas and cloisters ===
- Fontana del Cervo
- Fontana Spinelli
- Fontana del Chiostro del Carmine Maggiore
- Fontana del Chiostro di San Gregorio Armeno
- Fontana di palazzo Castriota Scanderbeg
- Small fountain (n.290 Posillipo street)
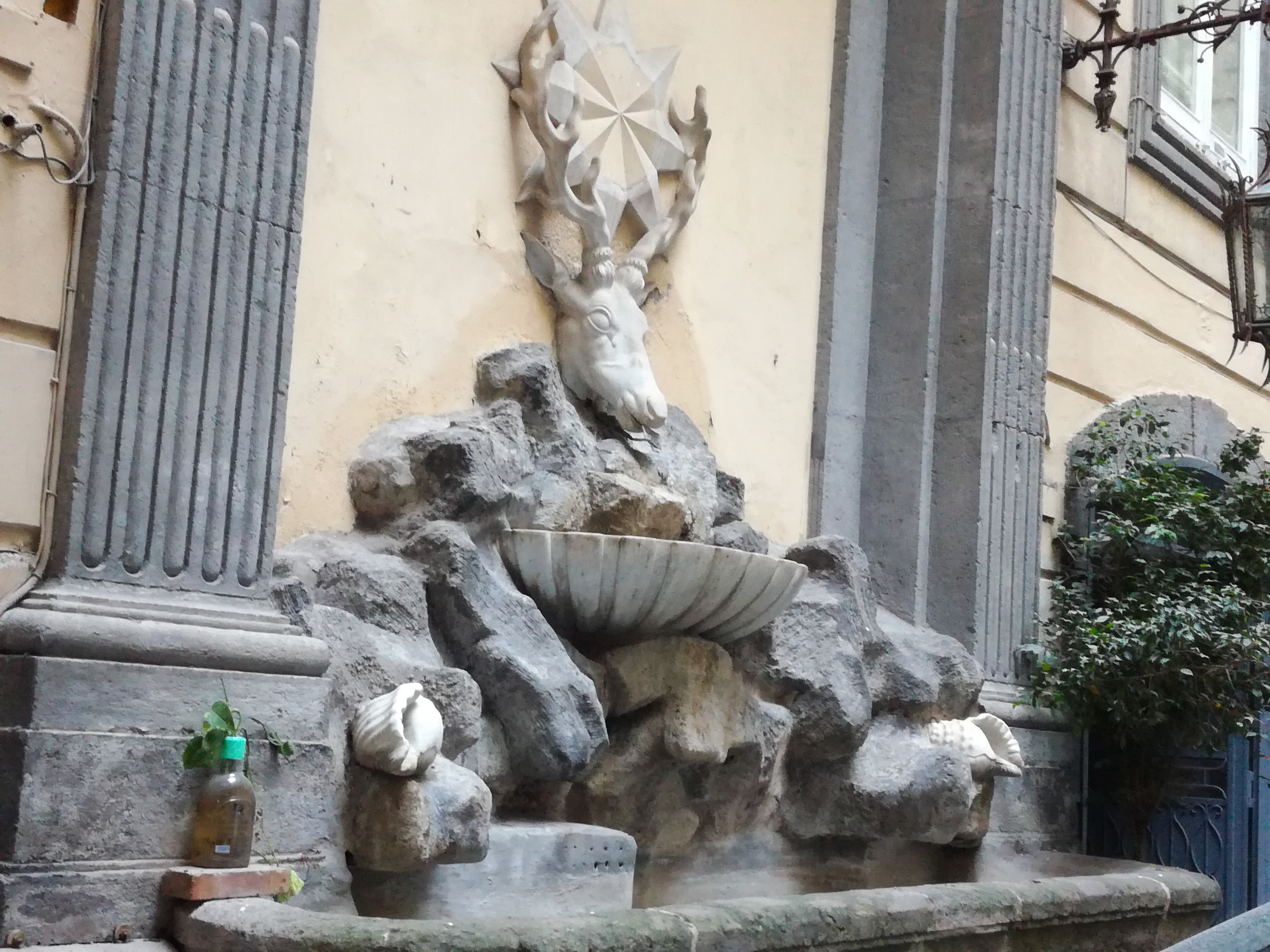
Berio fountain

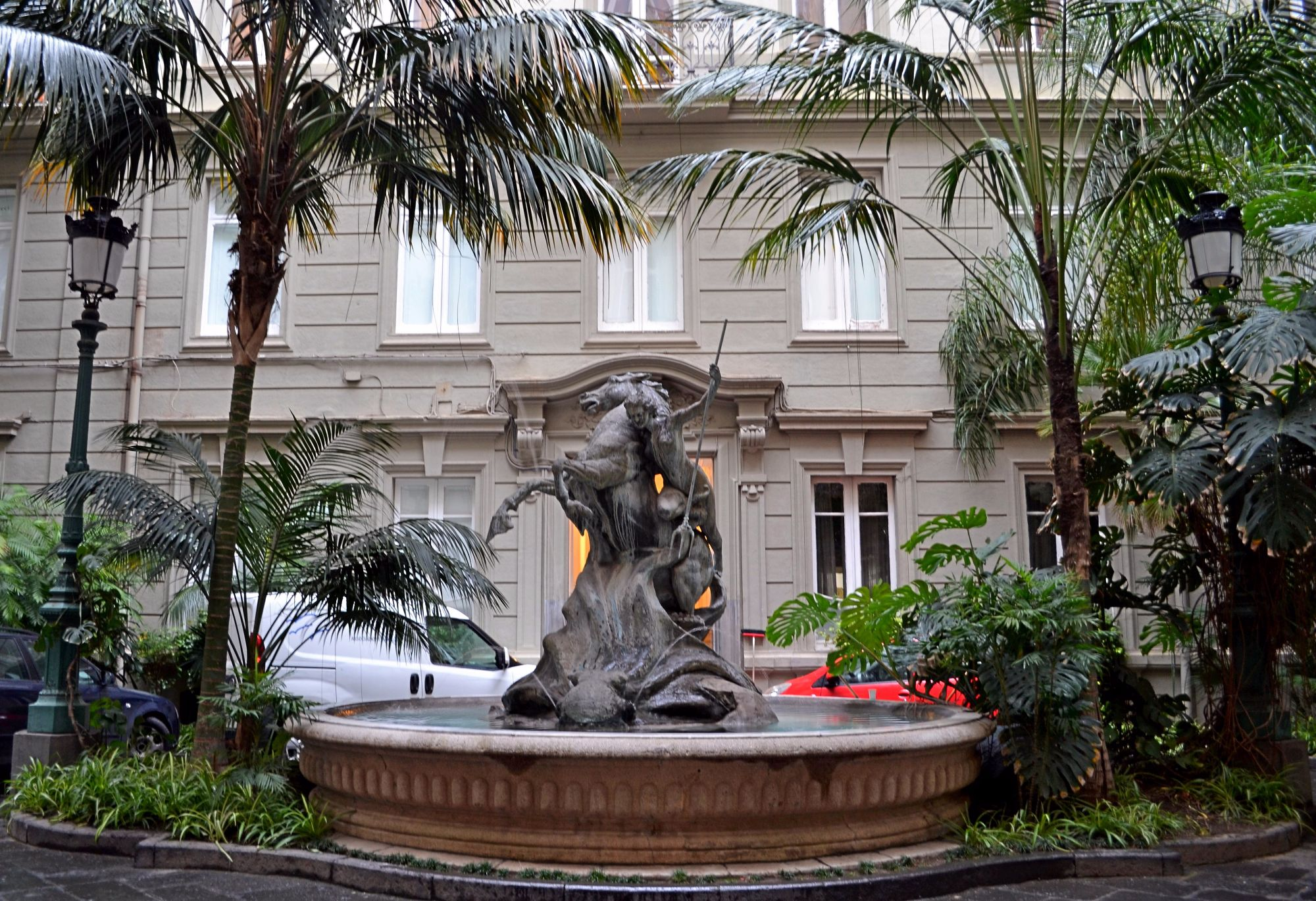
Spinelli fountain

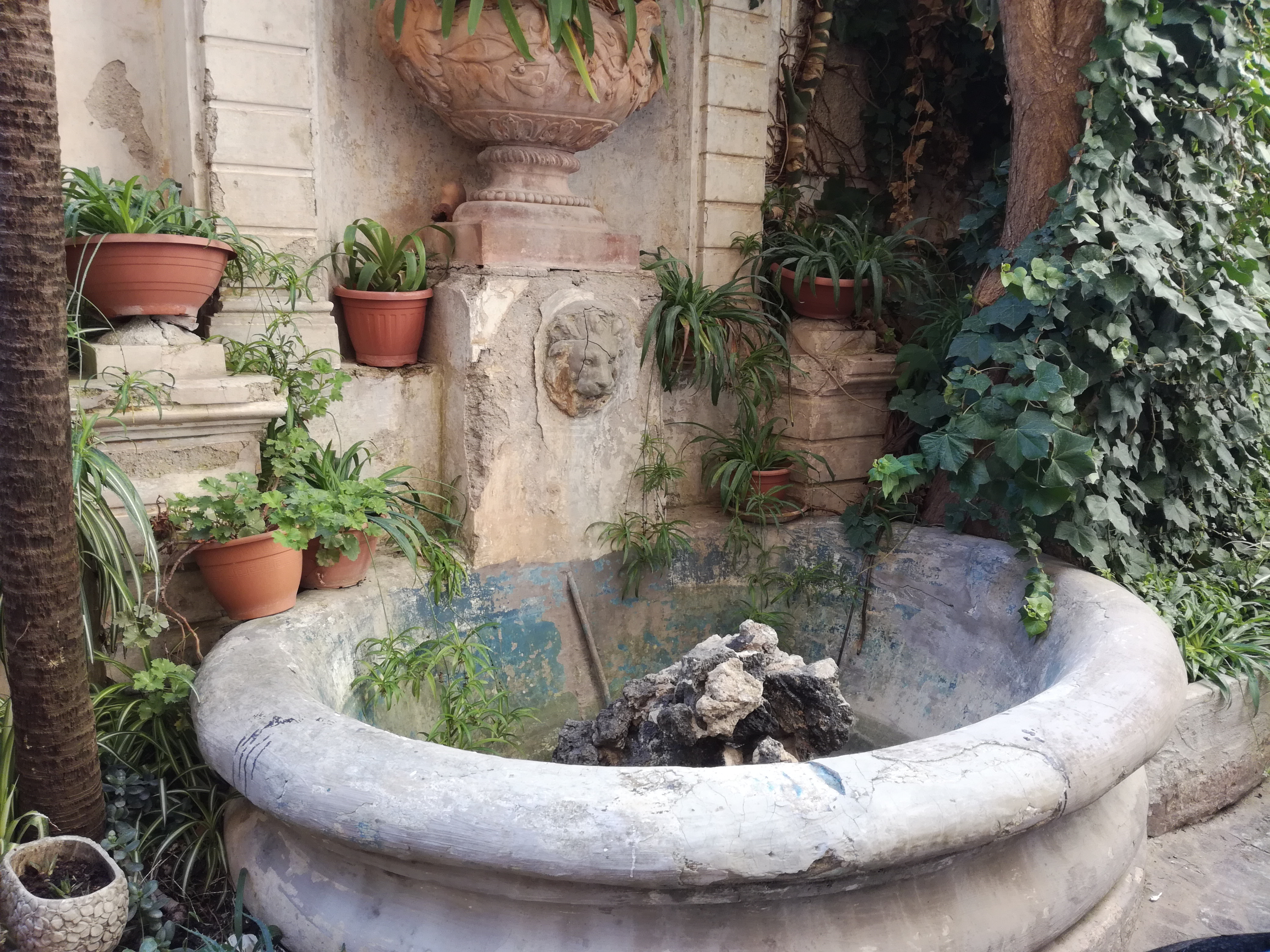
Small fountain (n.25 De Mille street)

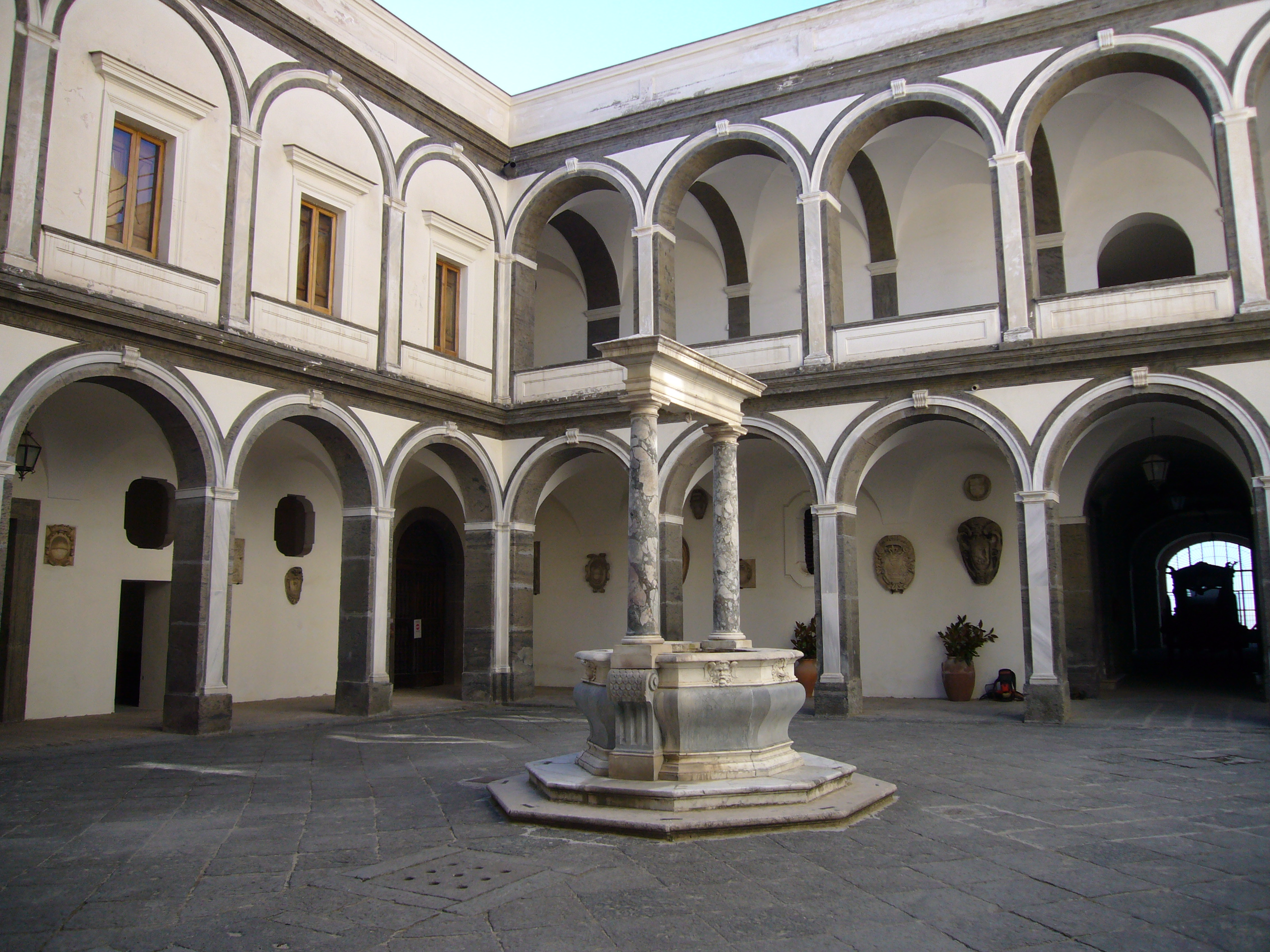
Procuratori's water well

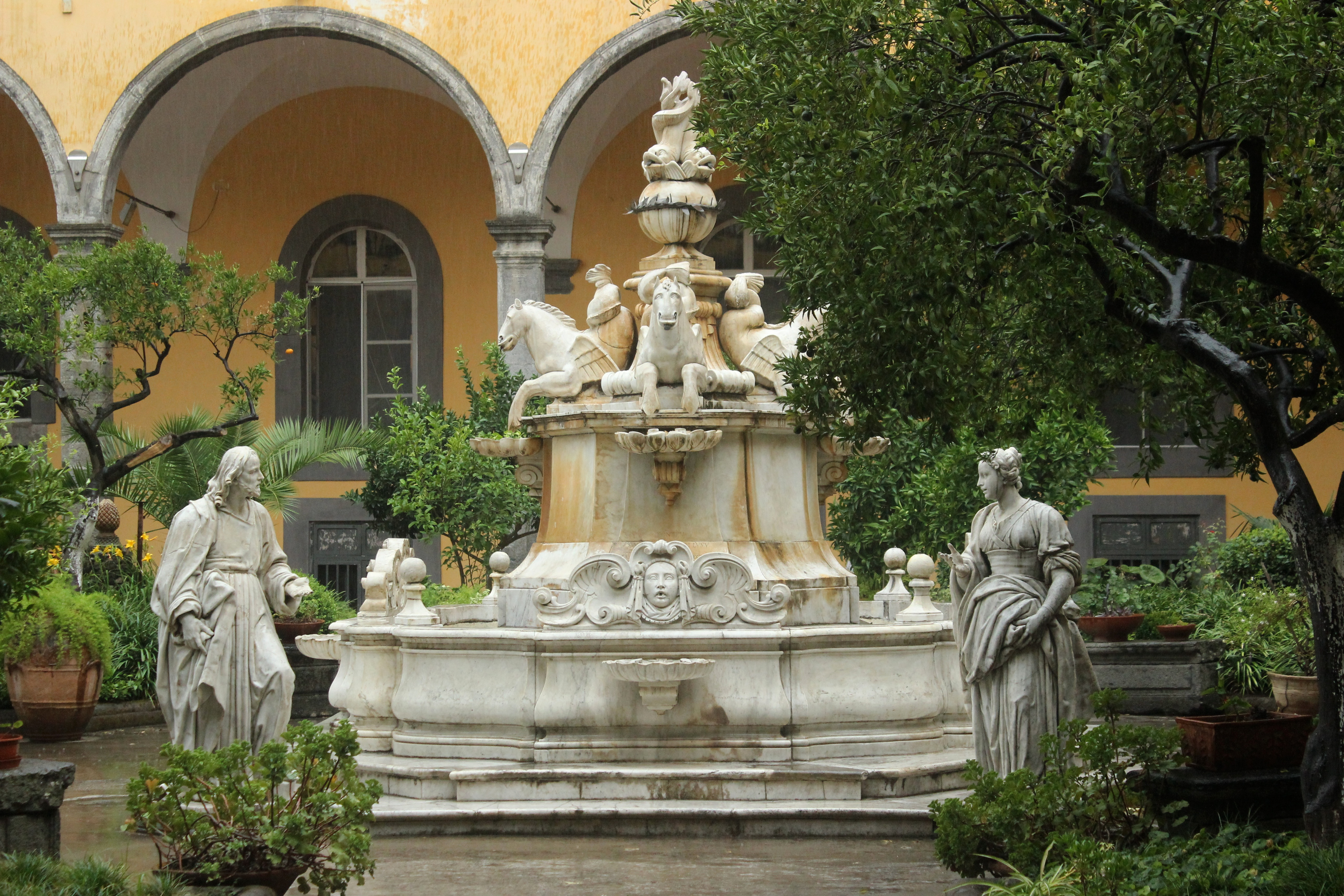
San Gregorio fountain

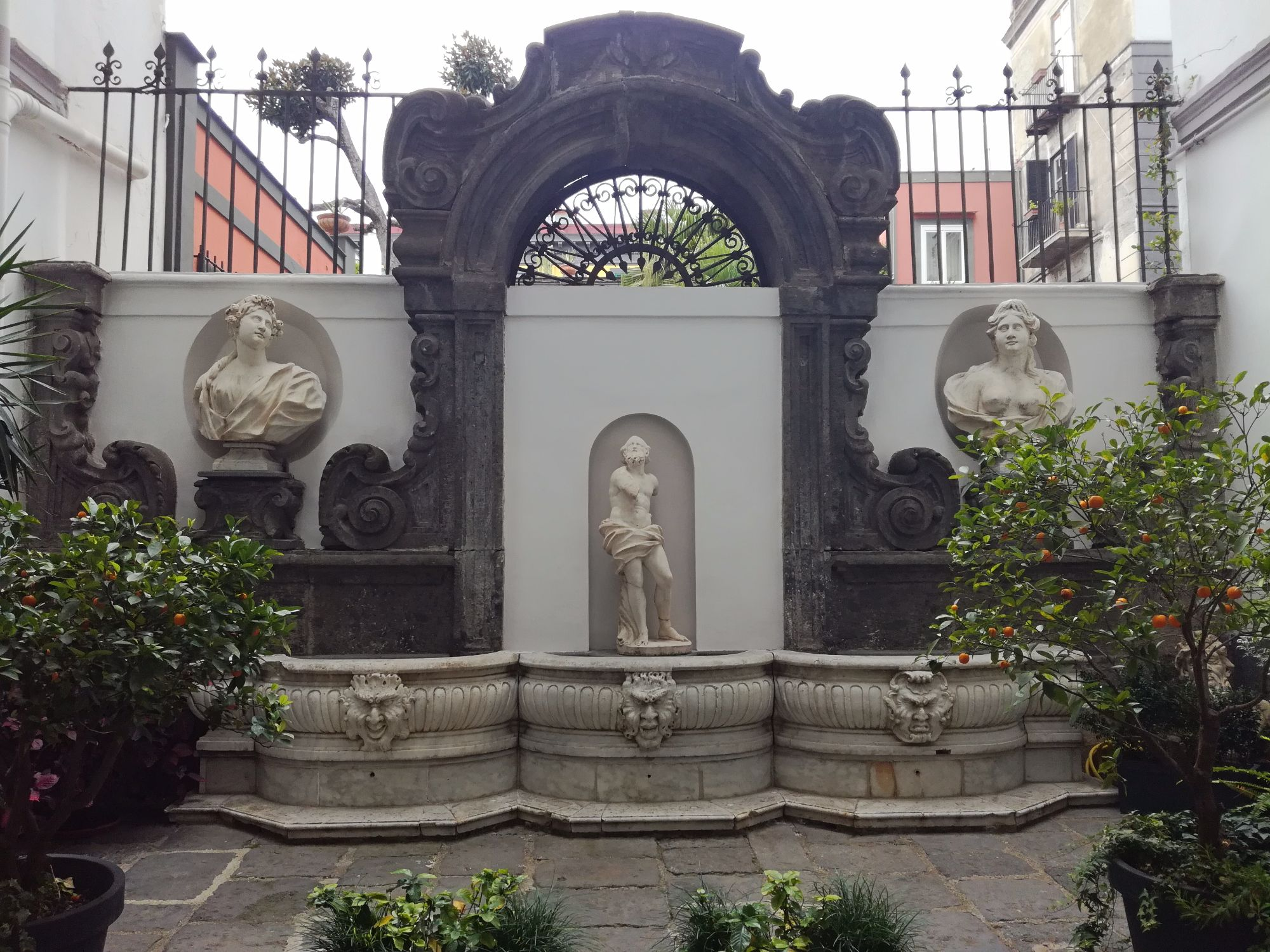
Castriota fountain.

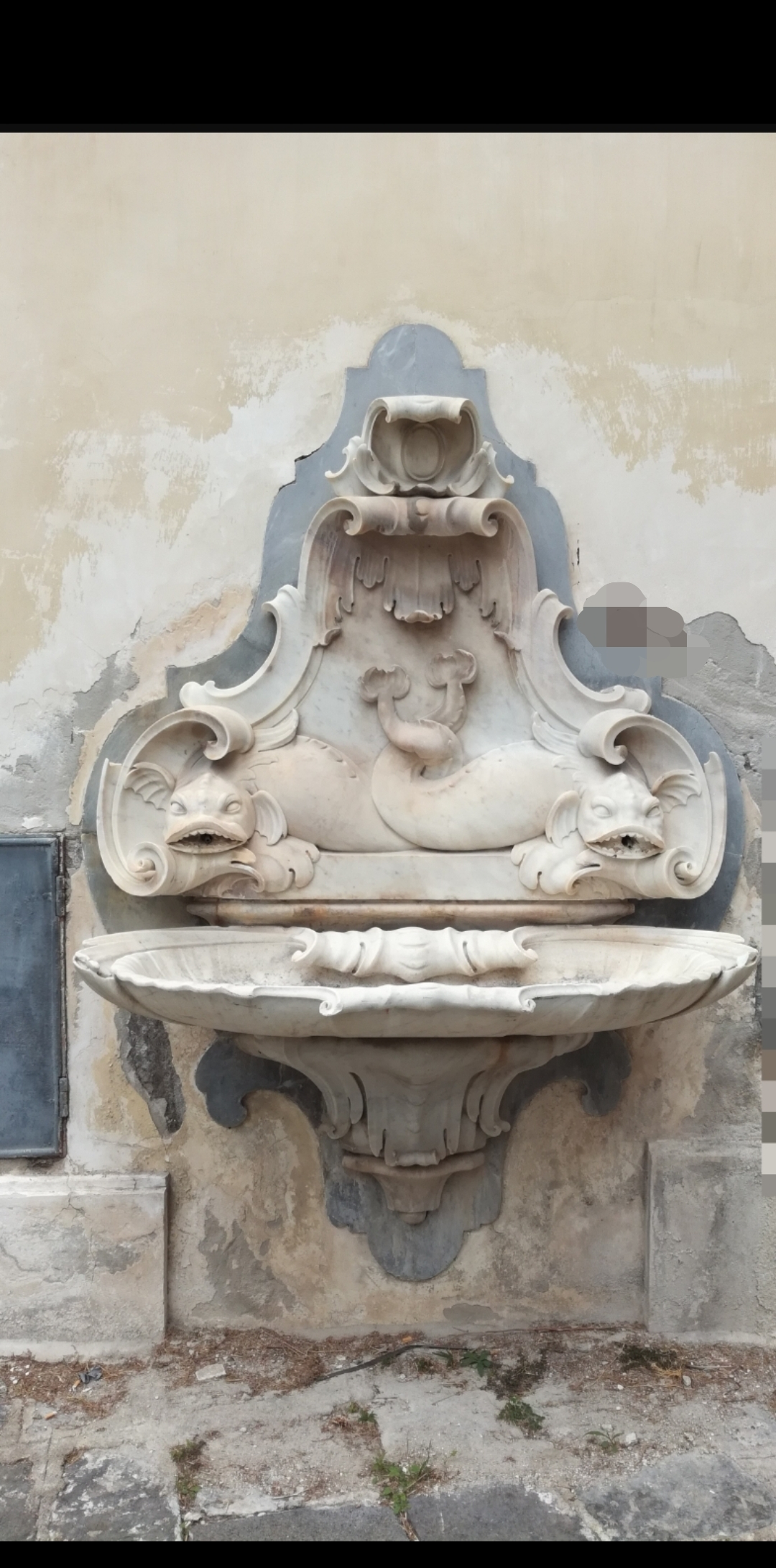
Incurabili fountain.

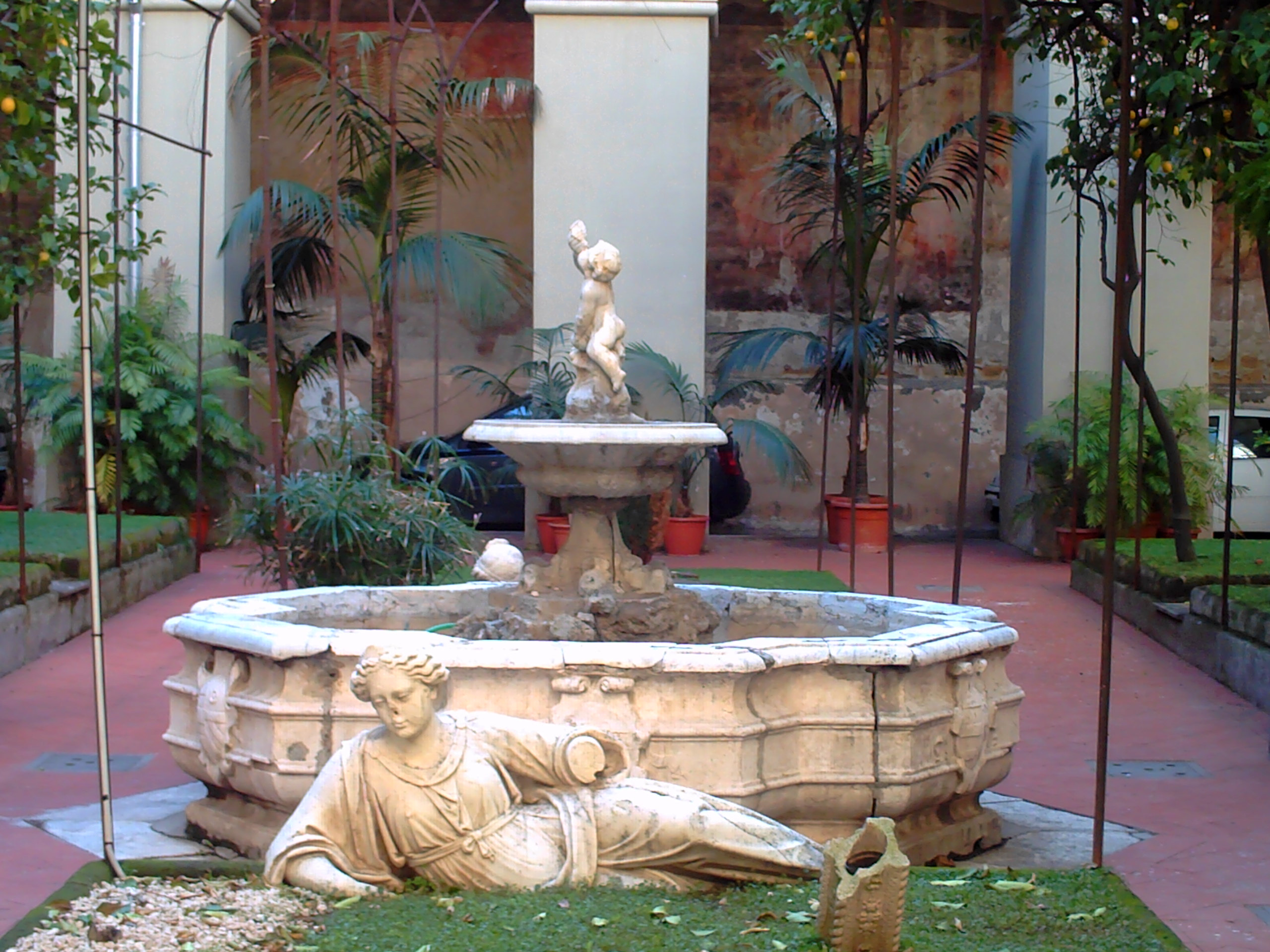
Carmine Maggiore fountain.

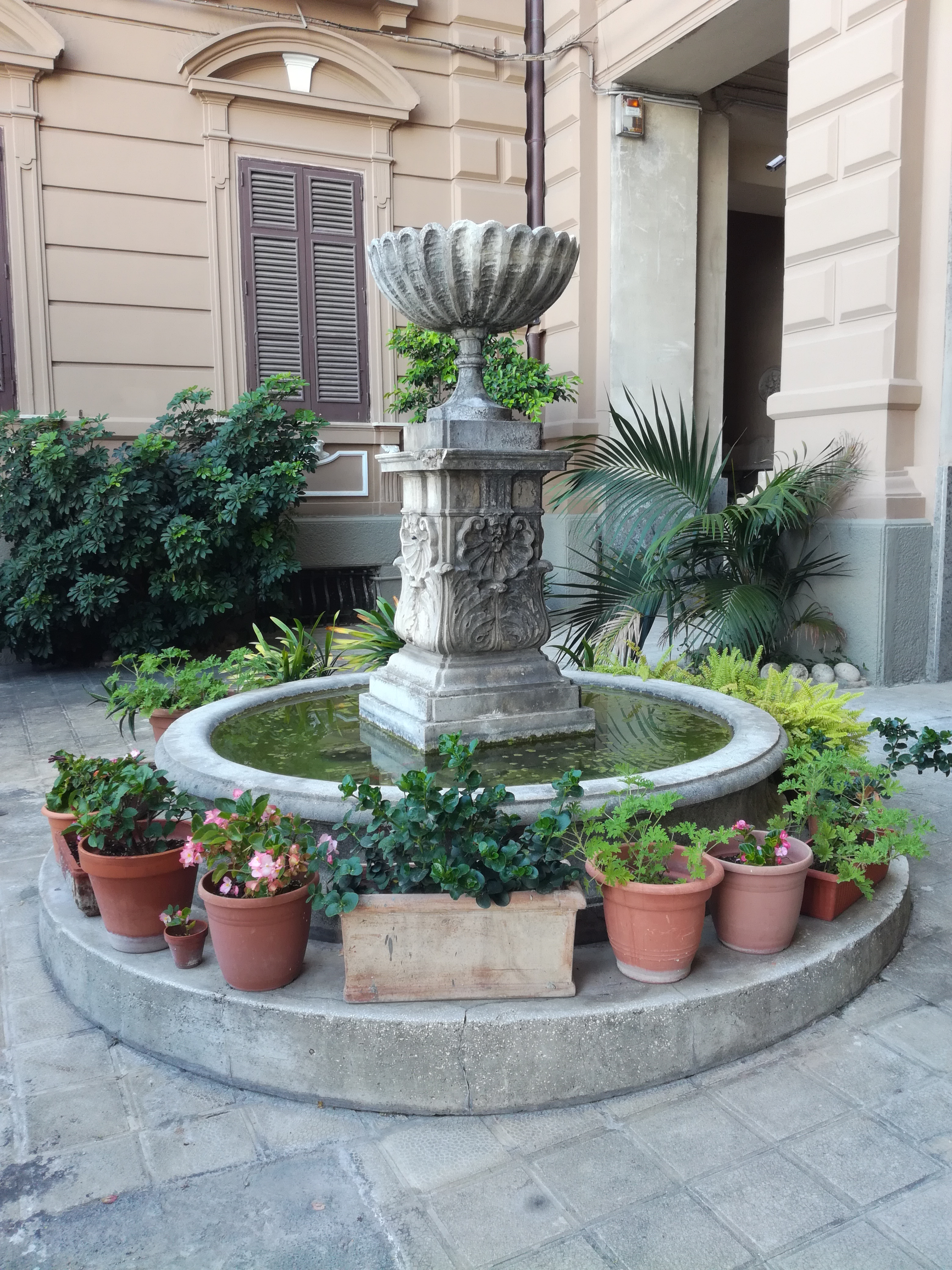
Small fountain (n.290, Posillipo street).

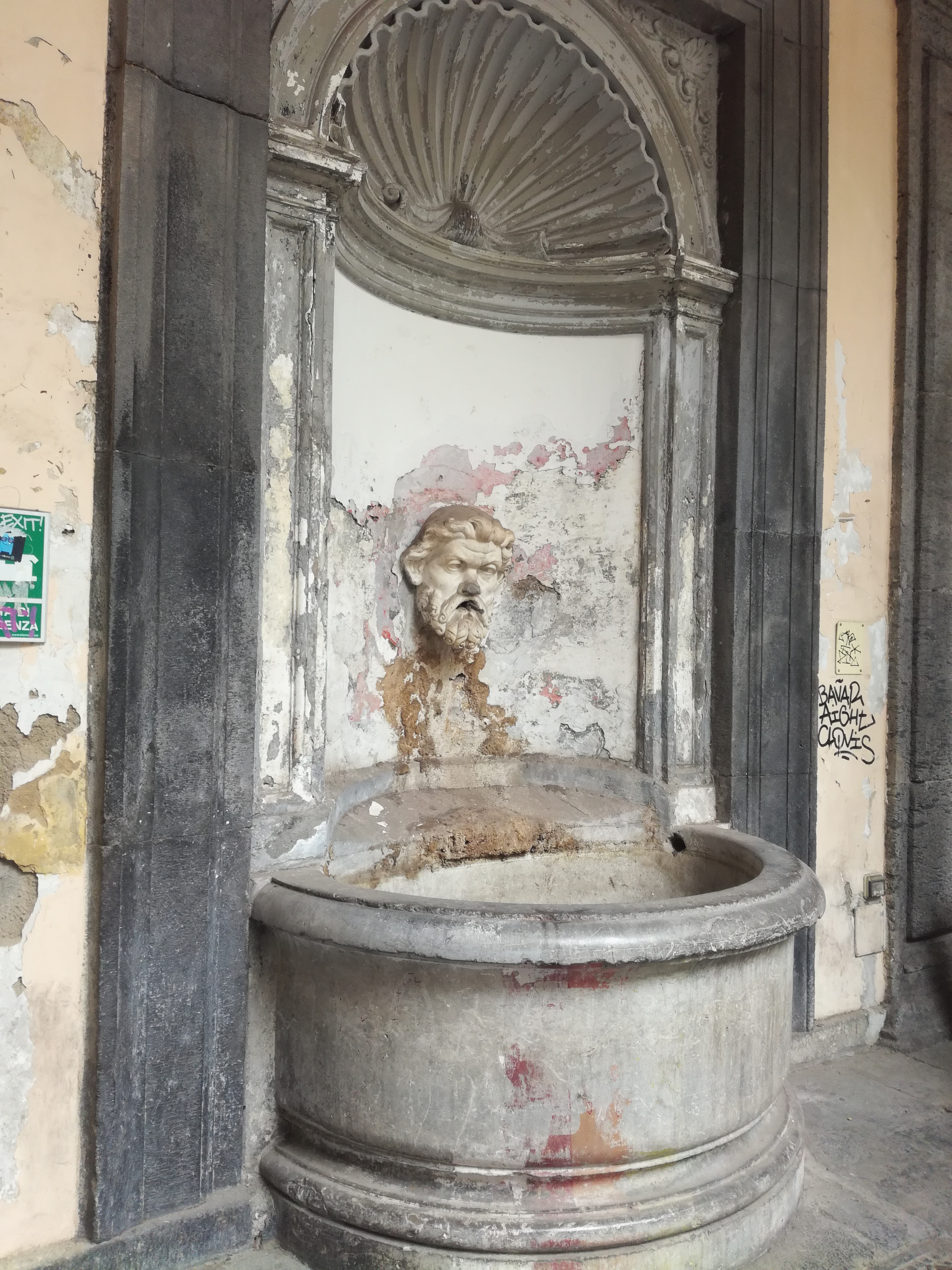
Gravina fountain.

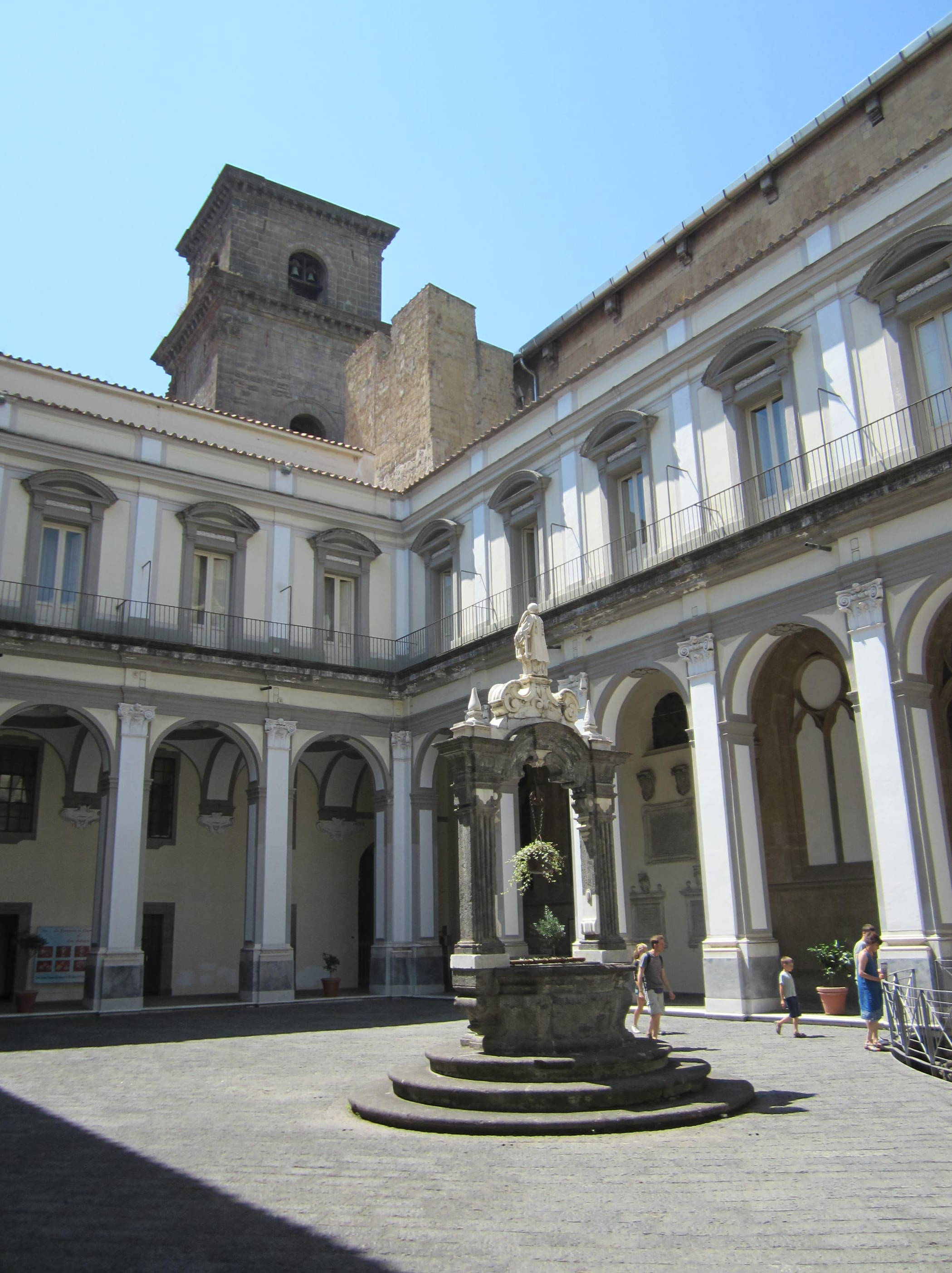
Lorenzo's water well.

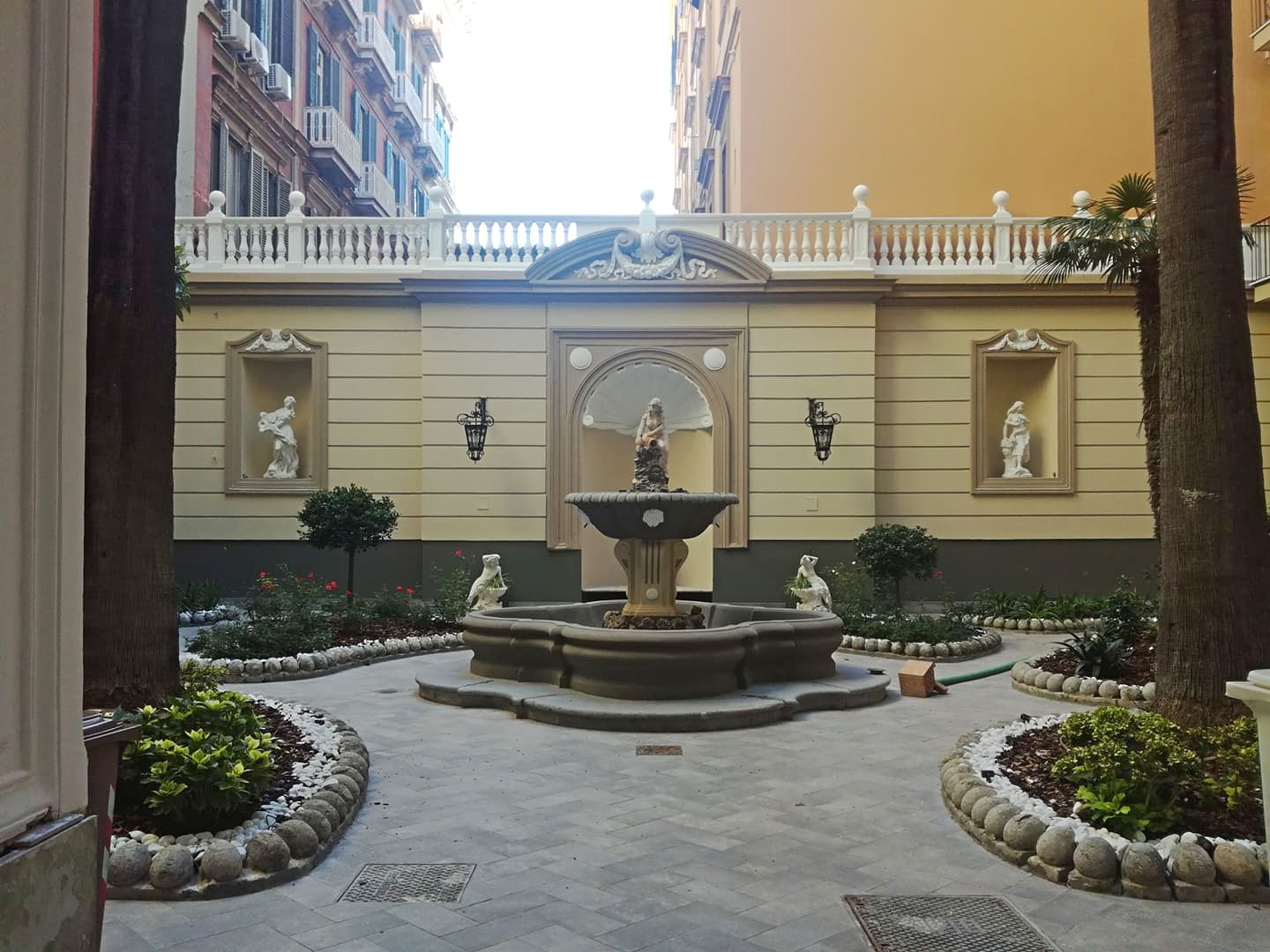
Fountain into a historical palace in Gramsci street
