= County of Villamediana =

The County of Villamediana (Spanish: Condado de Villamediana) was a title in the Spanish nobility given to Juan de Tassis y Acuña on 12 October 1603 by King Philip III. Tassis had acquired the town of Villamediana in 1600.

== List of counts ==
- Juan de Tassis y Acuña (1603–1607)
- Juan de Tassis y Peralta (1607–1622), famous poet
- Íñigo Vélez de Guevara y Tassis (1622–1658)
- Catalina Vélez Ladrón de Guevara y Manrique de la Cerda (1658–1684)
- Íñigo Manuel Vélez Ladrón de Guevara (1684–1699)
- Diego Gaspár Vélez de Guevara (1699–1725)
- Melchora de la Trinidad Vélez de Guevara (1725–1727)
- José de Guzmán y Guevara (1727–1781)
- Diego Ventura de Guzmán y Fernández de Córdoba (1781–1805)
- Diego Isidro de Guzmán y de la Cerda (1805–1849)
- María del Carmen de Guzmán y Caballero (1850–1882)
- Diego del Alcázar Guzmán y Vera de Aragón (1883–1922)
- Diego del Alcázar y Roca de Togores (1922–1965)
- Diego del Alcázar y Caro (1965–1994)
- Pedro del Alcázar y Narváez (1996– )
