= Onofrio Antonio Gisolfi =

Italian engineer and architect

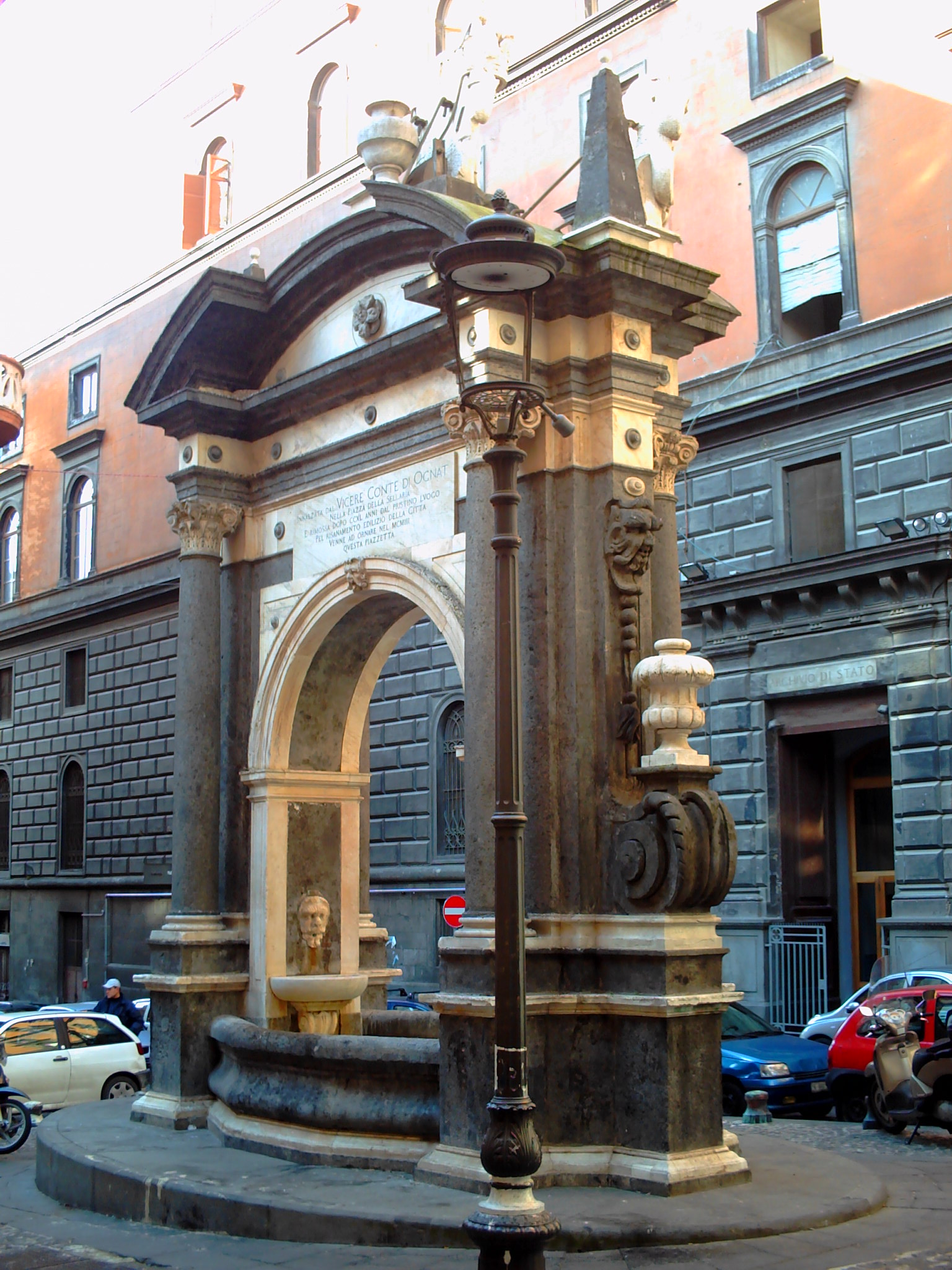
Fontana della Sellaria

Onofrio Antonio Gisolfi (died 1656, Naples) was an Italian engineer and architect, active from 1637 until his death.

== Life ==
He was born in Naples and succeeded Bartolomeo Picchiatti as chief royal engineer to the Kingdom of Naples. He worked on the Regi Lagni. He was joined by Picchiatti's son Francesco Antonio Picchiatti (then still very young) to complete work on the Palazzo Reale. Whilst Gisolfi was away from the city for a time in 1645, Cosimo Fanzago made a failed attempt to take the post of chief royal engineer from him. In 1647, Gisolfi was commissioned by the Pii Operai to design and build the church of San Nicola alla Carità, completed in 1656. In 1649, Iñigo Vélez de Guevara also commissioned him to design the public Fontana della Sellaria in honour of the suppression of the Capipopolo by the Neapolitan Republic. He died in 1656, probably of plague, and the role of chief royal engineer passed to Francesco Antonio.
