= San Ferdinando, Naples =

Coordinates: 40°50′08″N 14°14′50″E

San Ferdinando
- Quarter of Naples
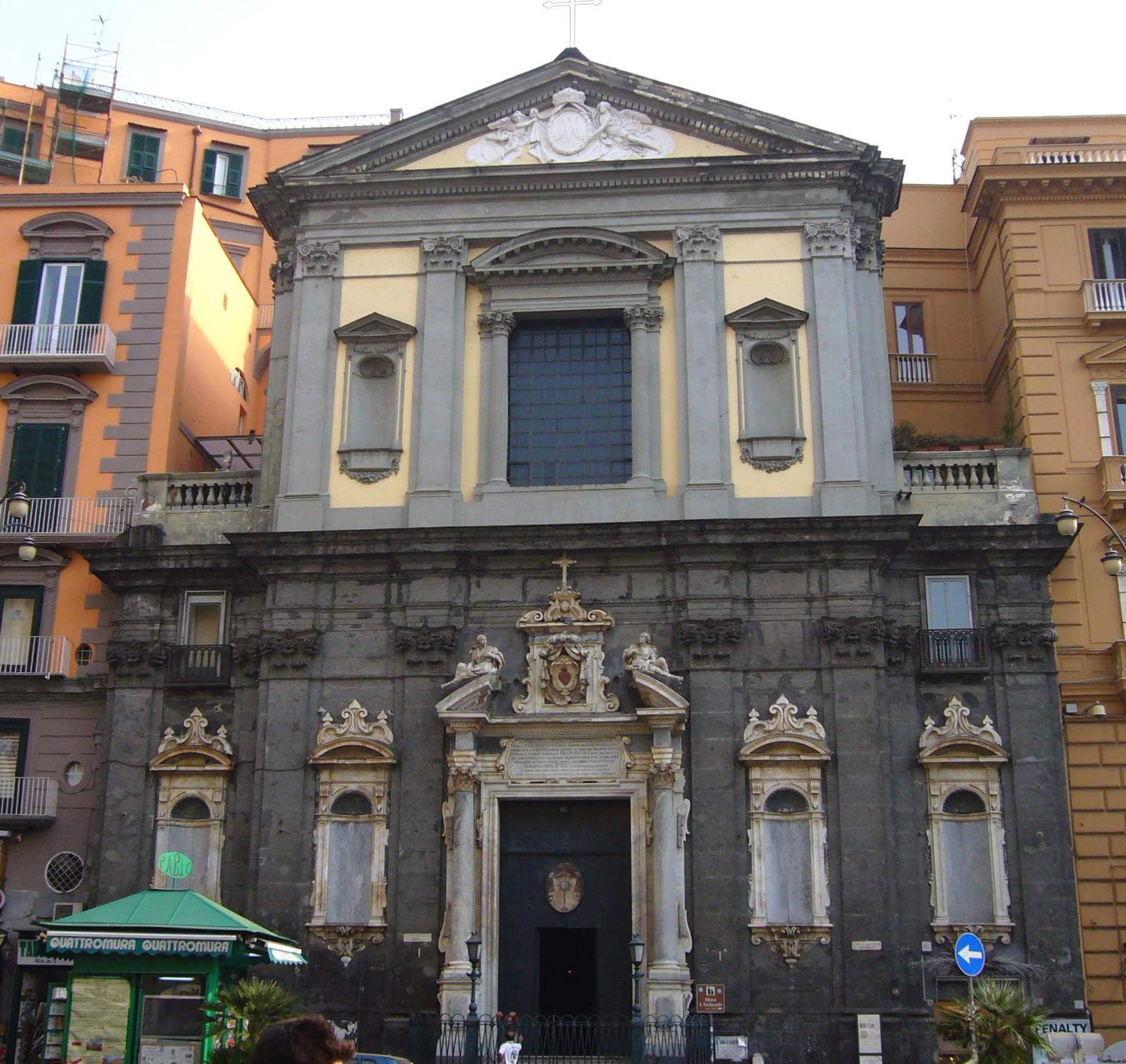
- The Church of San Ferdinando, from which the neighborhood takes its name

- Location of San Ferdinando within Naples
- Country: Italy
- Region: Campania
- City: Naples
- Municipalità: 1st

Area
  - Total: 0.92 km^{2} (0.36 sq mi)

Population
  - Total: 18,404
  - Density: 20,000/km^{2} (52,000/sq mi)
- Postal codes: 80132 and 80121

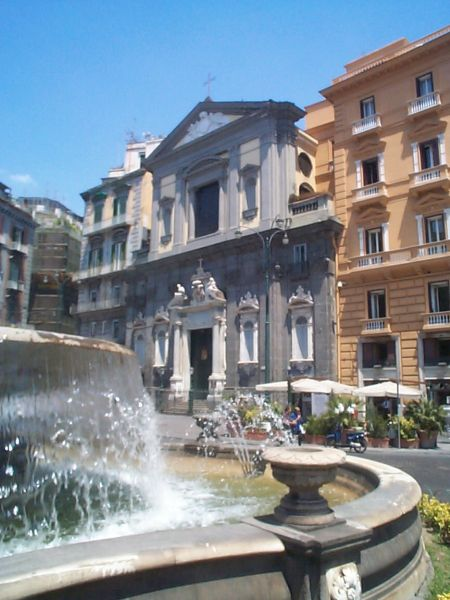
Church of San Ferdinando in Naples with Fontana del Carciofo in foreground Piazza di Trieste e Trento.

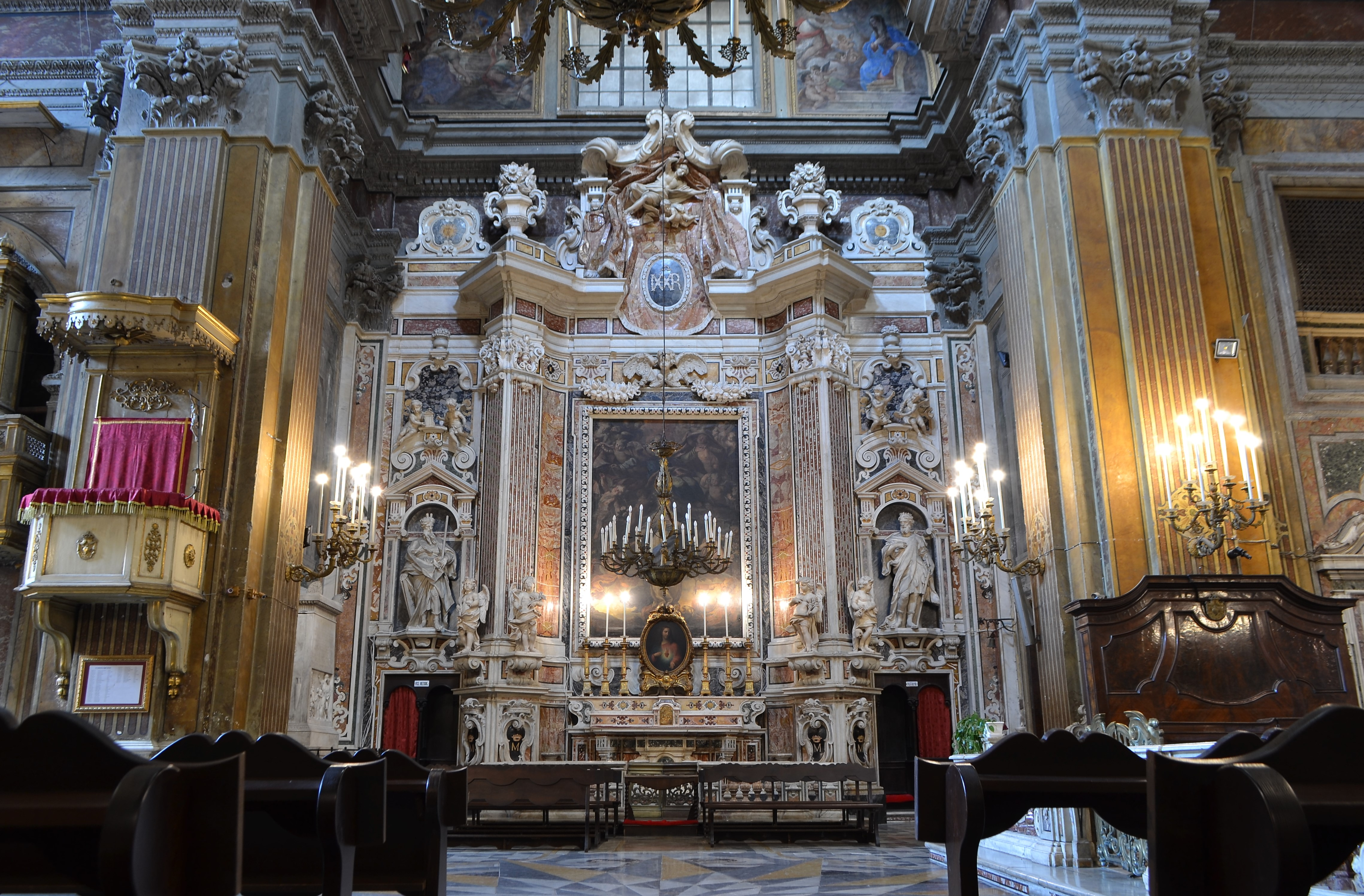
Interior

San Ferdinando is a southern quarter of Naples, with a population of about 18,000.

== Overview ==
San Ferdinando district includes, among the various landmarks, the Royal Palace, Piazza del Plebiscito (the most celebrated square of Naples), the San Carlo opera house and the church of San Ferdinando, from which the district is named.

== History ==
The district began to develop during the 16th century, when the Spanish built the Viceroy's Palace, later replaced by the Royal Palace designed by Domenico Fontana. In the following decades, the district became the area of Naples most desired by the city aristocracy because of its proximity to the court; many aristocratic villas and palaces were built there.
