= Duarte Fernando Álvarez de Toledo =

Spanish nobleman, soldier, and statesman (c. 1620 – 1671)

Duarte Fernando Álvarez de Toledo Portugal (c. 1620 – 25 June 1671) was a Spanish nobleman, soldier, and statesman, Grandee of Spain, 7th Count of Oropesa, 6th Count of Deleytosa, 3rd Marquis of Frechilla and Villarramiel, 3rd Marquis of Jarandilla, knight of the Order of Alcántara, who served as Viceroy of Navarre (1643–1645), of Valencia (1645–1650), of Sardinia, President of the Council of the Military Orders (1663–1669) and of the Council of Italy (1669–1671) and Spanish Ambassador to the Holy See.

== Biography ==
He was the second son of Fernando Álvarez de Toledo Portugal, V Count of Oropesa, and Mencía Pimentel Zúñiga, daughter of Juan Alonso Pimentel de Herrera, V Duke of Benavente. He succeeded his elder brother, Juan Álvarez de Toledo Portugal, VI Count of Oropesa, who died as a child in 1621. His sister was Mariana Engracia Álvarez de Toledo, a confidante of Queen Mariana of Austria.

He supported the King financially and militarily in the Portuguese Restoration War and the Reapers' War and was rewarded with the appointment of Viceroy of Navarre in 1642. Having managed to form a Navarrese Tercio of 1,000 men, he was transferred to become Viceroy of Valencia in 1645. There, he managed with difficulty to quell the unrest and had to take measures to alleviate the terrible plague of 1647–1648.

From 3 November 1650, he briefly occupied the Viceroyalty of Sardinia, and in 1652 he was sent to Rome as Extraordinary ambassador to the Holy See. Back in Spain, he was appointed as President of the Council of the Military Orders in 1663. His political career in Madrid under the reign of Charles II was crowned with the appointment in 1669 as President of the Council of Italy, and cut short by his death in 1671.

He was also a patron of the poet, historian and playwright Antonio de Solís, who was also his secretary.

=== Marriage and children ===
In 1636, Duarte married his first cousin Ana Mónica de Córdoba y Pimentel, 6th Countess of Alcaudete, with whom he had a son:

- Manuel Joaquín Álvarez de Toledo (1641–1707), Valido (prime minister) of Charles II of Spain.

Government offices
Preceded by Sebastián Suárez de Mendoza	Viceroy of Navarre; 1642–1645	Succeeded by Andrea Cantelmo
Preceded by Rodrigo Ponce de León	Viceroy of Valencia; 1645–1650	Succeeded by Pedro Urbina Montoya
Preceded by Gian Giacomo Teodoro Trivulzio	Viceroy of Sardinia; 1651–1651	Succeeded by Beltrán Vélez de Guevara
