= Oñate (surname) =

Oñate is a Basque surname. Notable people with this surname include:

- Cristóbal de Oñate (1504–1567), Spanish conquistador, father of Juan de Oñate
- Juan de Oñate (1550–1626), New Spanish explorer and colonial governor
- Jorge Oñate (1949–2021), Colombian singer and composer
- Santiago Oñate Laborde (born 1949), Mexican lawyer and politician
- Santiago Oñate (born 1951), Chilean footballer
- Eugenio Oñate Ibañez de Navarra (born 1953), Spanish engineer
