= Beltrán Vélez de Guevara, Marquis of Campo Real =

Spanish political figure

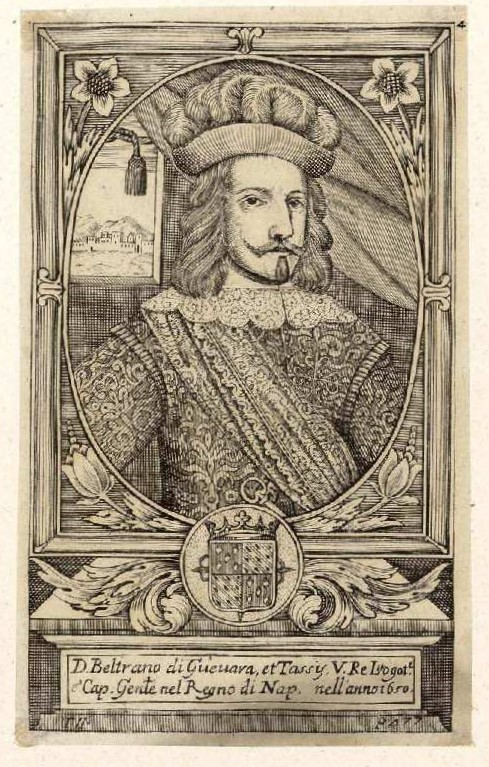
Beltrán Vélez de Guevara, by Domenico Antonio Parrino (1692).

Beltrán Vélez Ladrón de Guevara, 1st Marquis of Monreale (Sardinia) and 1st Marquis of Campo Real (Spain) (died 21 February 1652) was a Spanish political figure.

== Biography ==
He was the son of Iñigo Vélez de Guevara and Catalina de Guevara, 5th Countess of Oñate. He married Catalina Vélez, 9th Countess of Oñate, daughter of his brother Íñigo Vélez de Guevara, 8th Count of Oñate.

He began his career at court as a gentleman of the Chamber of Philip IV and of his younger brother, Cardinal-Infante Ferdinand of Austria, whom he accompanied to Flanders (1632), also serving, always as a gentleman of the Chamber, the other brother of the King, the Infante Don Carlos. For all this, he obtained important favours from the monarch, the commission of various international missions and his trust within the court.

Together with his brother Íñigo Vélez, in 1626 he accompanied his father, the 5th Count, to Rome, where he established outstanding relations and completed his political-diplomatic training. In 1634 he intervened together with Cardinal Infante in the Battle of Nördlingen.

However, his most notable intervention in the service of the monarchy came in 1650, when it was decided in Madrid that he should replace his brother Íñigo as Viceroy of Naples, while the former was away on a military campaign in Tuscany, which was threatened by the French. He was interim Viceroy of Naples from April to September 1650.

He was a member of the State Council of Philip IV of Spain and Viceroy of Sardinia between 1651 and 1652. His son was Íñigo Vélez de Guevara, 10th Count of Oñate who married on 12 August 1666 Claire Louise de Ligne, daughter of Claude Lamoral, Prince of Ligne.

Government offices
Preceded by Íñigo Vélez de Guevara	Viceroy of Naples; April-September 1650	Succeeded by Íñigo Vélez de Guevara
Preceded by Duarte Fernando Álvarez de Toledo	Viceroy of Sardinia; 1651–1652	Succeeded by Pietro Jerónimo Martínez y Rubio
