= Mariana Engracia de Toledo y Portugal, Marquise of Los Vélez =

Spanish courtier

Mariana Engracia de Toledo Portugal y Pimentel, Marquise of Los Velez (1623-1686), was a Spanish courtier. She was the lady-in-waiting (junior Camarera mayor de Palacio) to the queen of Spain, Mariana of Austria, and the aya (nurse or royal governess) to king Charles II of Spain.

== Life ==
She was born to Fernando Álvarez de Toledo y Portugal, 6th Count of Oropesa, and Mencía María Alfonso-Pimentel y Zúñiga. Her brother was Duarte Fernando Álvarez de Toledo, Viceroy of Navarre, Valencia and Sardinia. She married her cousin Pedro Fajardo y Alfonso-Pimentel, 5th Marquis of Los Vélez (d. 1647).

She was appointed lady-in-waiting to the Queen in 1654, and promoted to junior or deputy Camarera mayor de Palacio to the Queen in 1659. She was a favorite and personal confidante of the Queen. They shared a common interest in religion. In 1661, she was appointed aya (nurse or governess) to Crown prince Charles.

When the infant crown prince became King and her friend Queen Mariana became Queen regent in 1665, Mariana Engracia came in to a position of great influence at court. She was courted in her own palace by supplicants such as the Ambassadors of France and Austria. She strengthened her position by forming a mutual alliance with the Queen's Jesuit prime minister Juan Everardo Nithard. She and Nithard formed a court fraction known as the Nithardas, who was opposed by the court fraction supported by the John Joseph of Austria and the senior Camarera mayor de Palacio.

Her position weakened when she chose to support John Joseph of Austria against the Queen, when the Queen wished to prolong her regency in 1675, which destroyed her relationship with Queen Mariana. She still kept a power position in her capacity as the royal governess of the King. She supported the marriage of the King to Marie Louise d'Orléans, and was appointed one of her ladies-in-waitings in 1679. She managed to become also a trusted confidante of Queen Marie Louise, who supported her against the Queen mother.
