= List of viceroys of Sardinia =

This is a list of viceroys of Sardinia.

== Aragonese Viceroys ==
From 1418 to 1516 Sardinia was ruled by viceroys from the Crown of Aragon, which merged into the Monarchy of Spain in 1516.

- Lluís de Pontons (1418–1419)
- Joan de Corbera (1419–1420)
- Riambau de Corbera (1420–1421)
- Bernat de Centelles (1421–1437)
- Francesc d'Erill i de Centelles (1437–1448)
- Nicolás Carroz de Arborea (1460–1479)
- Pere Maça de Liçana i de Rocafull (1479)
- Ximén Pérez Escrivá de Romaní (1479–1483) (first time)
- Guillem de Peralta (1483–1484)
- Ximén Pérez Escrivá de Romaní (1484–1487) (second time)
- Iñigo Lopez de Mendoza y Quiñones (1487–1491)
- Juan Dusay (1491–1501) (first time)
- Benito Gualbes (interim) (1501–1502)
- Juan Dusay (1502–1507) (second time)
- Jaume Amat i Tarré (1507–1508)
- Fernando Girón de Rebolledo (1508–1515)
- Àngel de Vilanova (1515–1529)

== Spanish direct rule, 1516–1714 ==
- Martín de Cabrera (1529–1532)
- Jaime de Aragall (interim) (1533)
- Francisco de Serra (interim) (1533)
- Antonio Folc de Cardona y Enriquez (1534–1549)
- Pedro Veguer, Bishop of Alghero, Interim for absence, 1542 to 1545
- Jerónimo Aragall (interim) (1549–1550) (1st time)
- Lorenzo Fernández de Heredia (1550–1556)
- Jerónimo Aragall (interim) (1556) (2nd time)
- Álvaro de Madrigal (1556–1569)
- Jerónimo Aragall, Virrey Interino por Ausencia, en 1561 (3rd time)
- Juan IV Coloma y Cardona, 1st Count of Elda (1570–1577)
- Jerónimo Aragall (interim) (1577–1578) (4th time)
- Miguel de Gurrea y Moncada (1578–1584) first term, Viceroy of Majorca, 1575 – 1578
- Gaspar Vicente Novella, Archbishop of Cagliari, Viceroy during a leave, 1584 – 1586
- Miguel de Gurrea y Moncada, 1586 – 1590, second term
- Gastón de Moncada, 2nd Marquis of Aitona (1590–1595)
- Antonio Coloma y Saa, 2nd Count of Elda (1595–1603)
- Alfonso Lasso y Sedeño, Archbishop of Cagliari, Viceroy during a leave, (1597–1599)
- Juan de Zapata, Viceroy during a leave, (1601–1602)
- Jaime Aragall (interim) (1603–1604) (1st time)
- Pedro Sánchez de Calatayud, Count of Real (1604–1610)
- Jaime Aragall (interim) (1610–1611) (2nd time)
- Carlos de Borja, Duke of Gandia (1611–1617)
- Alonso de Eril, 1st Count of Eril (1617–1623)
- Luis de Tena (interim) (1623)
- Juan Vives de Canyamás, Baron of Benifayró (1623–1625)
- Diego de Aragall (interim) (1625) (1st time)
- Pedro Ramón Zaforteza, Count of Santa María de Formiguera (Capitán General) (1625–1626)
- Jerónimo Pimentel, Marquis of Bayona (1626–1631)
- Diego de Aragall (interim) (1631) (2nd time)
- Gaspar Prieto, Archbishop of Alghero (interim) (1631–1632)
- Antonio de Urrea, Marquis of Almonacir (1632–1637)
- Diego de Aragall (interim) (1637–1638) (3rd time)
- Gianadrea Doria, Prince of Melfi (1638–1639)
- Diego de Aragall (interim) (1639–1640) (4th time)
- Fabrizio Doria, Duke of Arellano (1640–1644)
- Luis Guillermo de Moncada, 7th Duke of Montalto (1644–1649)
- Bernardo Matías de Cervelló (interim) (1649) (1st time)
- Giangiacomo Teodoro Trivulzio (1649–1651)
- Duarte Álvarez de Toledo, Count of Oropesa (1651)
- Beltrán Vélez de Guevara, Marquis of Campo Real (1651–1652)
- Pedro Martínez Rubio, Archbishop of Palermo (1652–1653)
- Francisco Fernández de Castro Andrade, Count of Lemos (1653–1657)
- Bernardo Matías de Cervelló (interim) (1657) (2nd time)
- Francisco de Moura, 3rd Marquis of Castel Rodrigo (1657–1661)
- Pedro Vico, Archbishop of Cagliari (interim) (1661–1662)
- Niccolò Ludovisi, Prince of Piombino (1662–1664)
- Bernardo Matías de Cervelló (interim) (1664–1665) (3rd time)
- Manuel de los Cobos, 4th Marquis of Camarasa (1665–1668)
- Francisco de Tutavila y del Rufo, Duke of San Germán (1668–1672)
- Fernando Joaquín Fajardo de Zúñiga Requesens, Marquis of los Vélez (1673–1675)
- Melchor Cisternes de Oblite (interim) (1675) (1st time)
- Francisco de Benavides de la Cueva, Marquis of las Navas (1675–1677)
- Melchor Cisternes de Oblite (interim) (1679–1680) (2nd time)
- José de Funes y Villalpando, Marquis of Ossera (1680)
- Philip of Egmont, Count of Egmont (1680–1682)
- Diego Ventura, Archbishop of Cagliari (interim) (1682)
- Antonio López de Ayala Velasco, Count of Fuensalida (1682–1686)
- José Delitala y Castelví (interim) (1686–1687)
- Niccolò Pignatelli, Duke of Monteleone (1687–1690)
- Carlos Homo Dei Moura y Pacheco, Marquis of Castel Rodrigo (interim) (1690)
- Luis Moscoso Ossorio, Count of Altamira (1690–1696)
- José de Solís Valderrábano Dávila, Count of Montellano (1697–1699)
- Fernando de Moncada, Duke of San Juan (1699–1703)
- Francisco Ginés Ruiz de Castro, Count of Lemos (1703–1704)
- Baltasar de Zúñiga y Guzmán, Marquis of Valero (1704–1706)
- Pedro Manuel Nuño Colón de Portugal y Ayala, Duke of Veragua and Marquess of Jamaica (1706–1709), last viceroy supporting Philip V of Spain. Sardinia was conquered in 1708 by pro-Habsburg Spanish troops on a British fleet.
- Fernando de Silva y Meneses, Count of Cifuentes (1709–1710), Supported Charles III of Spain
- Jorge de Heredia, Count of Fuentes (1710–1711)
- Andrés Roger de Eril, Count of Eril (1711–1713)

At the end of the War of the Spanish Succession, by the Treaty of Rastatt (1714), Sardinia was ceded to Austria.

== Austrian Viceroys ==
- Pedro Manuel, Count of Atalaia (1713–1717)
- José Antonio de Rubí y Boxadors, Marquis of Rubí (1717)

== Spanish Viceroys ==
The island was briefly reconquered by Spain during the War of Quadruple Alliance.

- Juan Francisco de Bette, Marquis of Leide (1717–1718)
- Gonzalo Chacón y Orellana (1718–1720)

== Savoyard Viceroys ==
In 1720, Sardinia was ceded to Savoy by the Treaty of The Hague.

- 1720–1723: Filippo-Guglielmo Pallavicini, baron di St. Rémy (1st time)
- 1723–1726: Doria Del Marco
- 1726–1727: Filippo-Guglielmo Pallavicini, baron di St. Rémy (2nd time)
- 1727–1731: Tomaso Ercole Roero di Cortanze
- 1731–1735: Girolamo Galletti, marchese di Castagnole i di Barolo
- 1735–1738: Carlo-Amadeo San-Martino, marchese di Rivarolo
- 1738–1741: Conte d'Allinge d'Apremont
- 1741–1745: Barone di Blonay
- 1745–1748: Del-Carretto, marchese di Santa-Giulia
- 1748–1751: Emanuele, principi di Valguarnera
- 1751–1755: Giambattista Cacherano, conte di Brischerasio
- 1755–1763: Costa, conte della Trinitá
- 1763: Giambattisa Alfieri
- 1763: Solaro De Govone
- 1763–1767: Lodovico Costa Della Trinitá
- 1767–1771: Vittorio-Lodovico d'Hallot, conte des Hayes
- 1771–1773: Caissotti, conte di Roubion
- 1773–1777: Filippo Ferrero, marchese di La Marmora
- 1777–1781: Giuseppe-Vincenzo-Francesco-Maria Lascaris, marchese della Rocchetta
- 1781–1783: Carlo-Francesco De Valperga, conte di Masino
- 1783–1787: Solaro de Maretta
- 1787–1790: conte Thaon de Sant 'Andrea
- 1790–1794: Carlo Balbiano
- 1794–1799: Filippo, marchese Vivalda
- 1799–1802: Duke Charles Felix of Savoy (1st time)
- 1802–1814 : no viceroys (Royal direct rule) because King Victor Emmanuel I was in Cagliari
- 1814–1817: Duke Charles Felix of Savoy (2nd time)
- 1817–1820: Ignazio Thaon De Revel, conte di Pratolungo
- 1820–1822: Ettore Veuillet, marchese d'Yenne
- 1822–1823: Giuseppe-Maria Galleani, conte di d'Agliano
- 1823–1824: Gennaro Roero, conte di Monticelli
- 1824–1829: Giuseppe Tornielli, conte di Vergano
- 1829–1831: Giuseppe-Maria Robert, conte di Castelvero
- 1831–1840: Giuseppe-Maria Montiglio d'Ottiglio ed Villanova
- 1840–1843: Giacomo, conte d'Asarta
- 1843–1848: Claudio Gabriele de Launay

In the 1847 Perfect Fusion, Sardinia was merged into the mainland holdings of the House of Savoy and the office of Viceroy was abolished the following year.

== Sources ==
- Viceré di Sardegna
- Michele Antonio Gazano: La storia della Sardegna (1777), vol. II, p. 266-273
- Virreinato de Cerdeña
- Worldstatesmen
