= Fontana del Carciofo, Naples =

Fountain of the Artichoke
- Fontana del Carciofo (Italian)
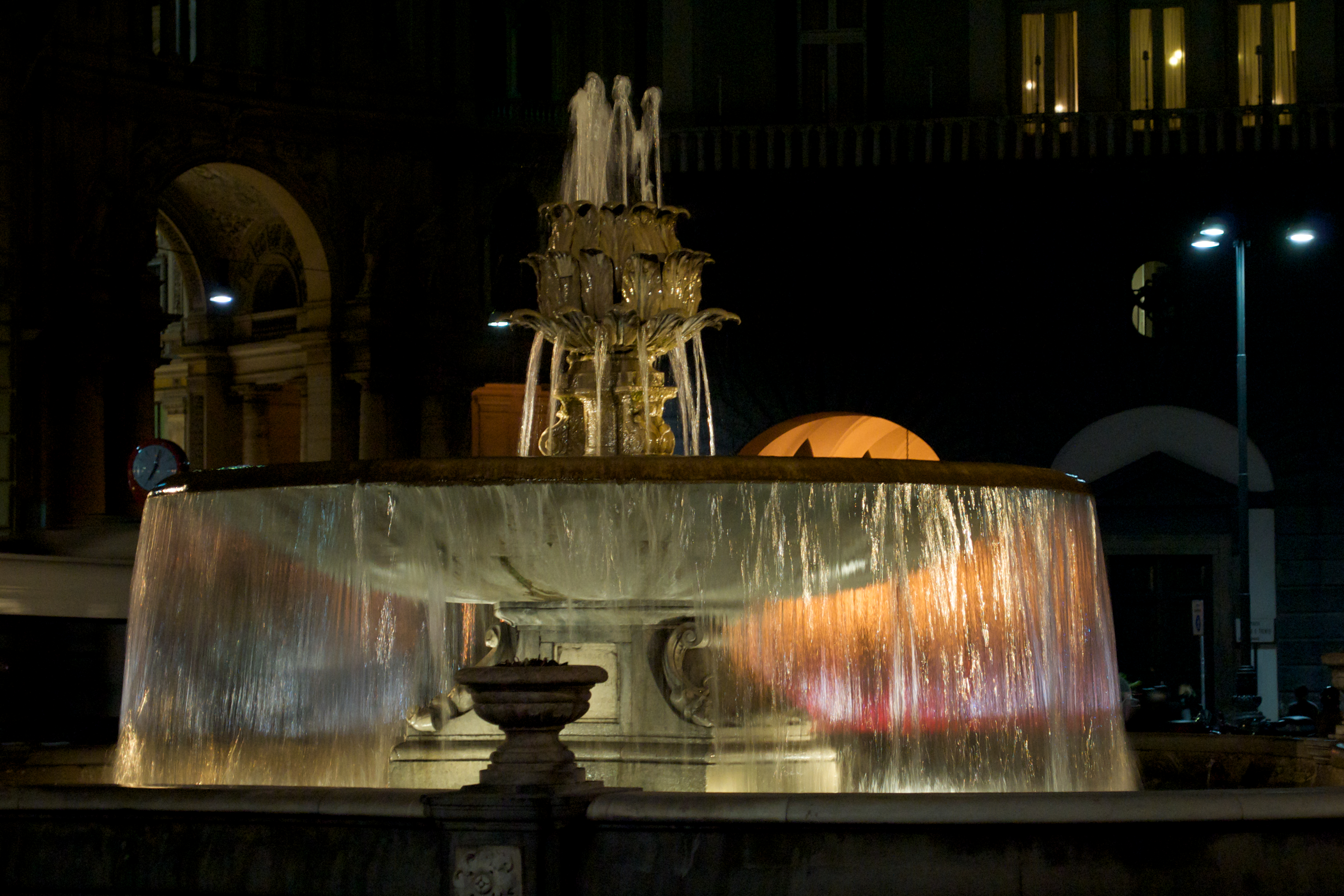
- Fountain of the Artichoke
- Year: 1956
- Type: Marble
- Location: Naples; 40.8372°N 14.2487°E

The Fontana del Carciofo or Fountain of the Artichoke is a monumental public fountain in central Naples, located in Piazza Trieste e Trento, just adjacent to the Piazza del Plebiscito. In the 1950s, plans were made to move the historic Fountain of Monteoliveto depicting the Spanish King to this site. However opposition to the move by the Consiglio Superiore delle Belle Arti, led the city to install this modern fountain featuring a vegetable instead and it was inaugurated in 1956. The area is maintained by the adjacent Caffe Gambrinus. The Church of San Ferdinando faces the piazza.
