= Santiago Oñate =

Chilean footballer (born 1951)

Personal information
- Full name: Santiago Hernán Oñate Cárdenas
- Date of birth: 30 July 1951 (age 75)
- Place of birth: Santiago, Chile
- Position: Right-back

Youth career
- 1966–1971: Universidad Católica

Senior career*
| Years | Team | Apps | (Gls) |
| 1972–1982 | Universidad Católica | 218+ | (1+) |
| 1982 | Fort Lauderdale Strikers | | |
| 1983–1986 | Rangers | 133 | (0) |
| 1987 | Deportes Linares | | |

Managerial career
- 2000–2001: Rangers (assistant)
- 2007: Rangers (assistant)
- * Club domestic league appearances and goals

Santiago Hernán Oñate Cárdenas (born 30 July 1951) is a Chilean former football player who played as a right-back. He is a historical player for Rangers de Talca.

== Playing career ==
Born in Santiago, Oñate joined the Universidad Católica youth ranks at the age of 15 and spent ten seasons with the first team from 1972 to 1982. He was part of the squad that won the 1975 Segunda División and returned to the Chilean Primera División after two years.

After a brief stint with American club Fort Lauderdale Strikers, Oñate returned to his homeland and joined Rangers de Talca in 1983. He became a historical player for them.

Oñate ended his career with Deportes Linares in 1987.

== Coaching career ==
Oñate served as assistant coach of Juan Ubilla and Juan Carlos Hernández for Rangers de Talca.

== Political career ==
Oñate was a candidate to councillor for Talca commune in both the 2016 and the 2021 Chilean municipal elections supported by Evópoli.

== Other works ==
Oñate has performed as a football commentator in radio media.
