= Fontana della Sellaria =

Fountain in Naples, Italy

Coordinates: 40.8485°N 14.2596°E

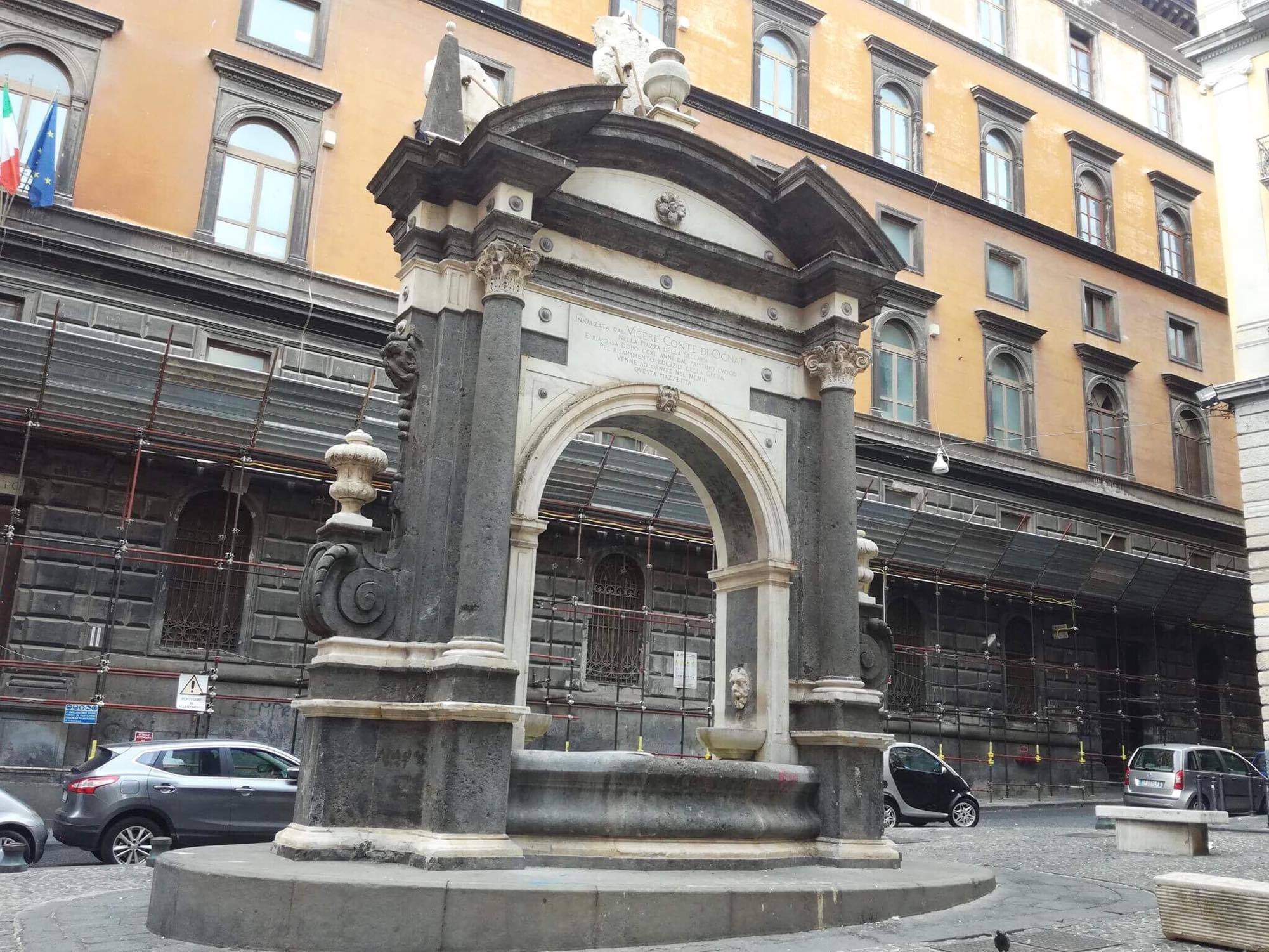
The Fontana della Sellaria

The Fontana della Sellaria or Selleria is a Baroque public fountain on piazzetta del Grande Archivio in Naples, Italy. It was commissioned in 1649 from Onofrio Antonio Gisolfi by Íñigo Vélez de Guevara to commemorate the latter's suppression of the Neapolitan Republic.
