= Íñigo Manuel Vélez Ladrón de Guevara =

Spanish nobleman

Íñigo Manuel Velez Ladrón de Guevara y Tassis, (1642 – 5 November 1699) was a Spanish nobleman, 10th count of Oñate, 4th count of Villamediana, a Grandee of Spain, (title bestowed to his family in 1640 by King Philip IV of Spain in 1640), and many other lesser or more recent titles, was a Head of the Imperial Spain Couriers and Post Offices, and a Knight of the Order of the Golden Fleece in 1687.

== Biography ==
He was the son of Beltrán Vélez de Guevara, Marquis of Campo Real and Catalina Vélez, 9th Countess of Oñate.

Around 1666, he married the childless, wealthy and influential Flemish widow, Louise Marie de Ligne, daughter of Claude Lamoral, Prince of Ligne, Prince of the Holy Roman Empire. They had 2 children :

- Diego Gaspard Vélez de Guevara (died 1725), 11th Count of Oñate, no issue.
- Melchora Vélez Ladrón de Guevara (died 1727), 12th Countess of Oñate, had issue.
