= San Ferdinando (church), Naples =

Church of San Ferdinando
- Chiesa di San Ferdinando
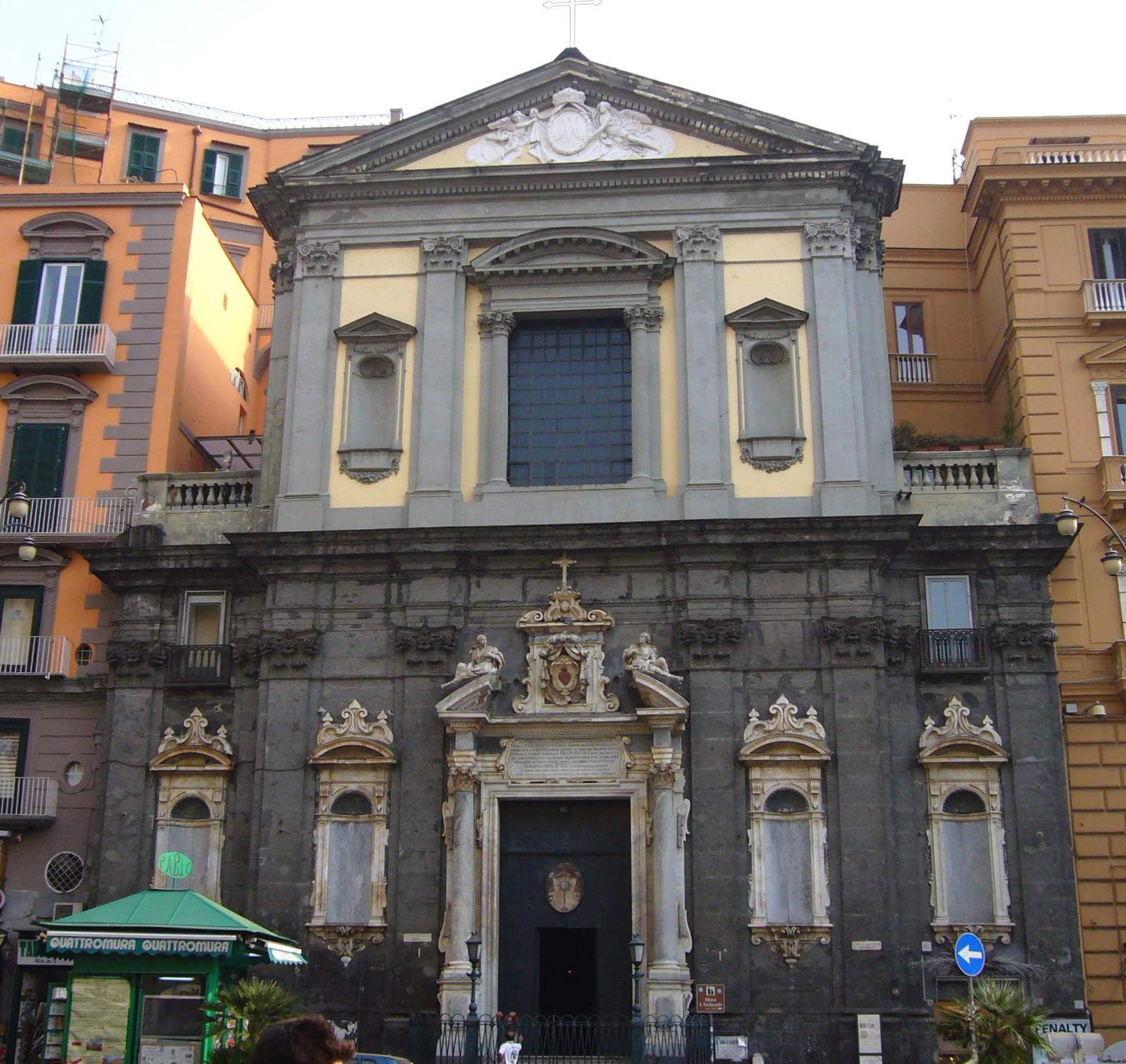
- The Church of San Ferdinando in Naples .
- Church of San Ferdinando
- 40.83762°N 14.248736°E
- Location: Piazza Trieste e Trento; Naples; Province of Naples, Campania
- Country: Italy
- Denomination: Roman Catholic

History
- Status: Active

Architecture
- Architectural type: Baroque architecture
- Groundbreaking: 1636
- Completed: 1759

Administration
- Diocese: Roman Catholic Archdiocese of Naples

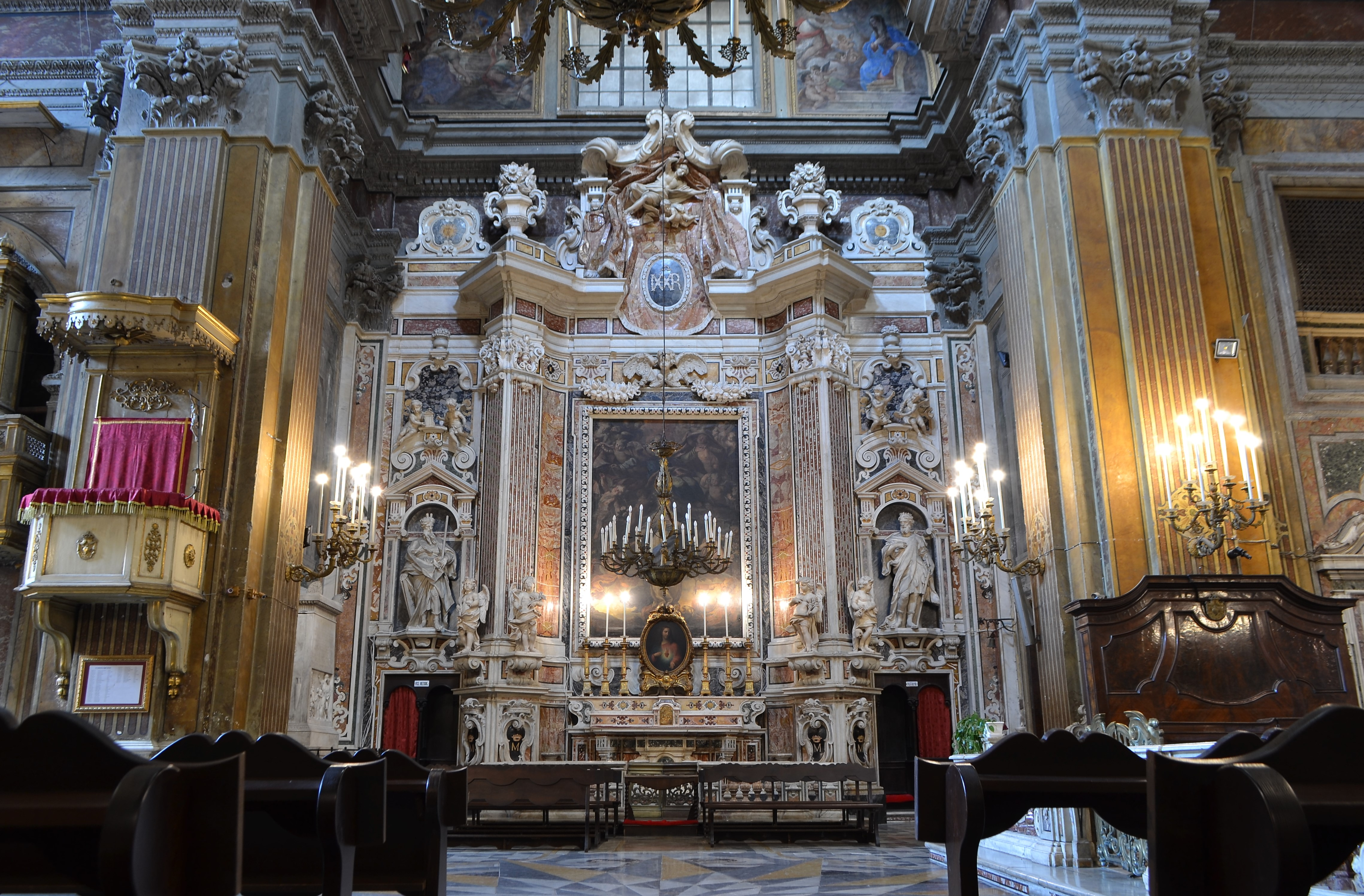
Interior.

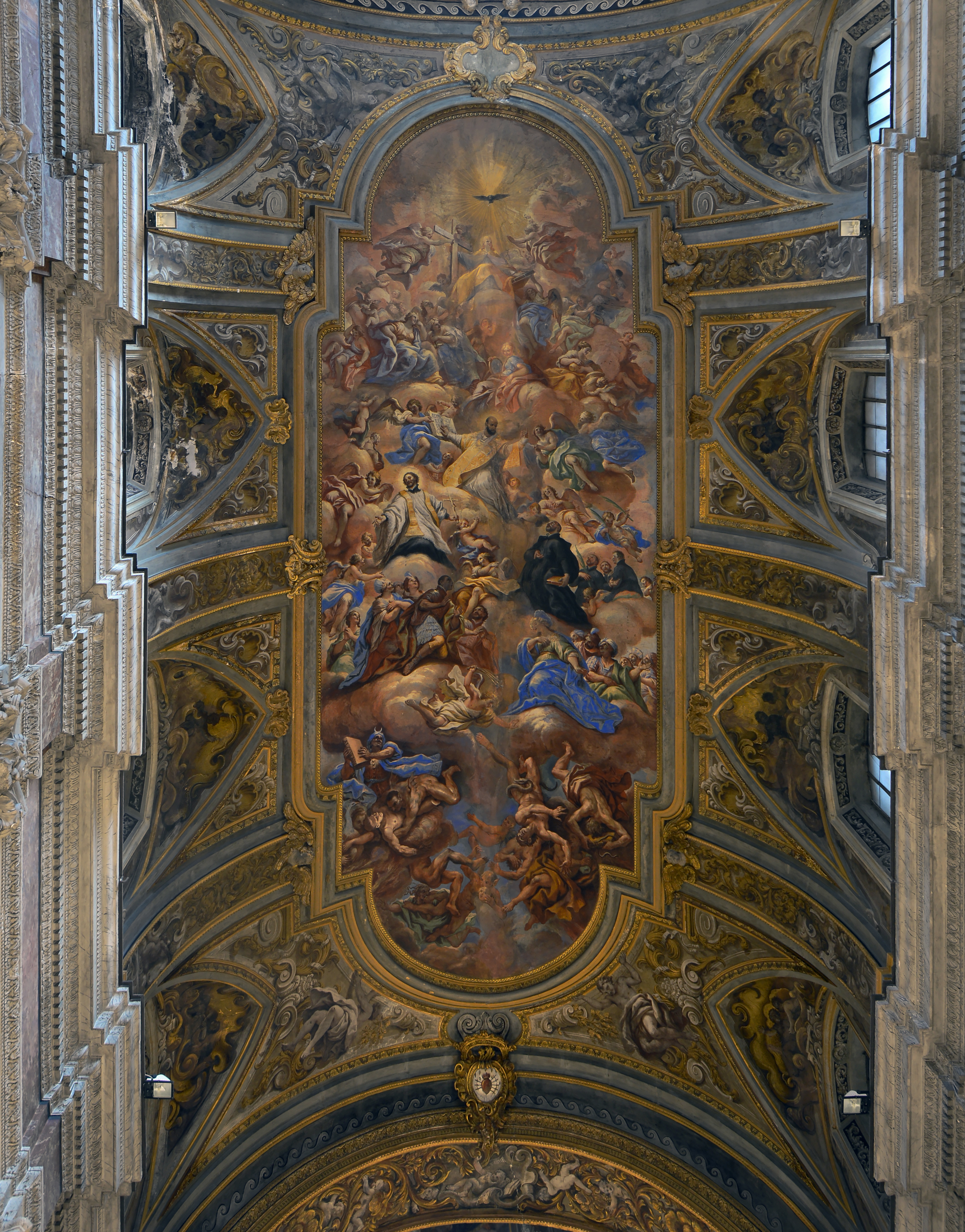
Ceiling

The Church of San Ferdinando is a historic church located on the Piazza Triesti e Trento, near the Royal Palace of Naples, in central Naples, Italy.

== History ==
The original church at the site was dedicated by the Jesuits to Saint Francis Xavier, and was built in 1636. Reconstruction in mid 1650s was entrusted to Cosimo Fanzago. In 1767, with the expulsion of the Jesuits from the realm, the church was granted to the Sacred Military Constantinian Order of Saint George who dedicated the church to Saint Ferdinand III of Castile, the patron saint of the reigning king of Naples Ferdinand IV.

The vault has a fresco with the story of Saint Francis Xavier and other Jesuits by Paolo De Matteis. The church contains statues by Domenico Antonio Vaccaro and Giuseppe Sanmartino. The main altarpiece is a canvas depicting San Ferdinando by Federico Maldarelli.

== See also ==
- List of Jesuit sites
