= Íñigo Vélez de Guevara, 8th Count of Oñate =

Spanish Count and political figure

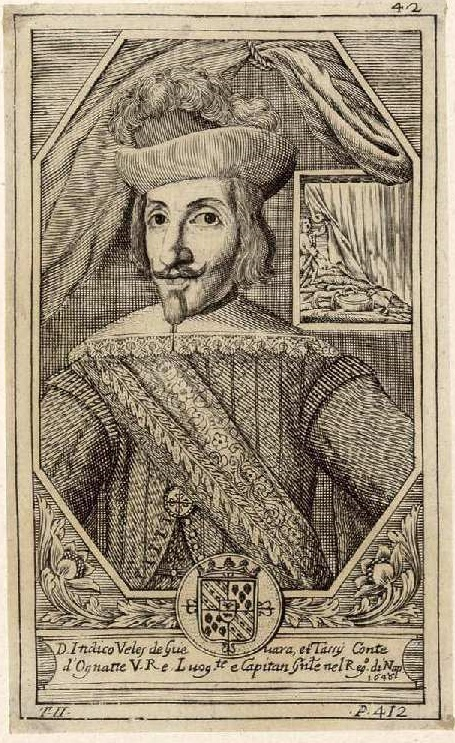
Íñigo Vélez de Guevara, 8th Count of Oñate

Íñigo Vélez de Guevara (1597–1658), 8th Count of Oñate, was a Spanish political figure.

== Biography ==
He was the son of Íñigo Vélez de Guevara and Catalina Vélez, 5th Countess of Oñate. His younger brother was Beltrán, Viceroy of Sardinia.

He was Spanish ambassador in London and Rome.
He played an important role in crushing the Neapolitan revolt of 1647 led by Masaniello. Oñate was the eventual vanquisher of the "Neapolitan Republic" and commissioned the Fontana della Sellaria to commemorate his victory.

He later served as viceroy of the Kingdom of Naples (from 1648) (see List of Spanish Viceroys of Naples), where he repulsed a French attack during the Franco-Spanish War (1635).
At his return in Spain he was made State Councilor and received the title of Marqués de Guevara.

He married Antonia Manrique de la Cerda and had two daughters:

- Catalina, first married her uncle Beltrán Vélez Ladrón de Guevara and then Ramiro Núñez de Guzmán, Duke of Medina de las Torres and viceroy of Naples;
- Mariana, married Juan Domingo Ramírez de Arellano.
