= Restoration of the Independence (Portugal) =

1640 end of Spanish Habsburg rule

1 December 1640 coup d'état
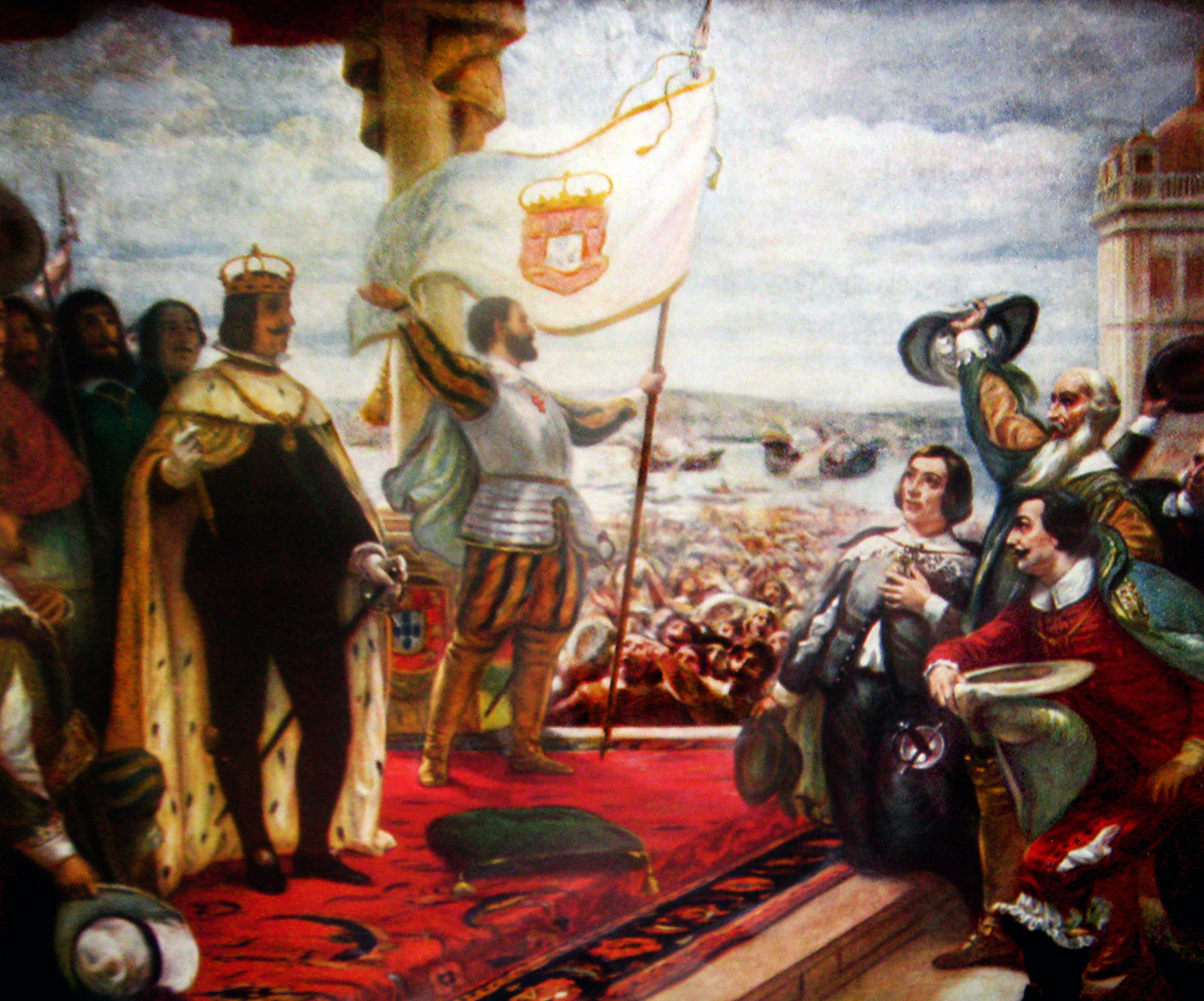
- Acclamation of John IV as king, by Veloso Salgado (1908).
| Date | 1 December 1640 |
| Location | Portugal |
| Result | Collapse of the Iberian Union; Restoration of Portuguese independence Beginning of the House of Braganza |

Belligerents
| (Portugal) Forty Conspirators | Habsburg Spain (Portugal) Loyalist Portuguese |

Commanders and leaders
| (Portugal) Duke of Braganza (Portugal) Count of Avranches (Portugal) Marquis of Marialva others | (Habsburg Spain) Margaret of Savoy, Vicereine of Portugal; Miguel de Vasconcelos |

The Restoration of Independence was a coup d'état carried out on 1 December 1640, led by Portuguese nobles with the aim of overthrowing the rule of the Spanish Habsburgs, who had governed Portugal since 1581. The coup was successful and ended the Iberian Union, restoring the independence of the Kingdom of Portugal and establishing a new ruling dynasty, the House of Braganza, with John IV, then Duke of Braganza, crowned king.

== Background ==
In 1578, in the battle of Alcácer Quibir, king Sebastian I disappeared and was later declared dead, leaving a power vacuum in the throne as he had no heirs. His great-uncle, cardinal Henry was declared king, but because he was a member of the Catholic Church he was unable to marry and produce heirs, not to mention his advanced age and poor health. Henry died less than two years after becoming king, prompting a succession crisis that put in jeopardy Portugal's own independence. Several candidates for the succession came forward, namely António, Prior of Crato, Philip II of Spain and Catarina of Portugal, Duchess of Braganza. The majority of the Portuguese people favored António, while most of the Portuguese court favored Philip II of Spain. A war of succession started, between António's and Philip's forces, resulting in Philip's victory and his acclamation as king of Portugal in 1581, thus forging the Iberian Union but with Portugal maintaining most of its autonomy.

== The coup ==
During the reign of Philip IV of Spain (Philip III of Portugal) the country's autonomy was strongly cut and the Portuguese court lost much of its privileges. Discontent spread among the people and the court, exacerbated by tax increases and suppressed revolts, such as the Manuelinho Revolt in Évora during 1638. A group of nobles, named the Forty Conspirators, initiated plans to stage a coup and expel Spanish rule, asking the Duke of Braganza, John, to head the revolt, but John's initial hesitation led the conspirators to threaten the declaration of a republic if John refused. In the end, John accepted. By 1640, a revolt in Catalonia gave the conspirators an opportunity, as most of Spanish forces were concentrated in dealing with this revolt. On 1 December 1640, a large group of nobles invaded the Ribeira Palace, found secretary Miguel de Vasconcelos hidden in a closet and murdered him by throwing him out of a window. The conspirators then arrested Margaret of Savoy, Vicereine of Portugal, granddaughter of Philip II of Spain, while news of the coup spread through Lisbon with the people celebrating, and John was acclaimed king of a restored, independent Portugal.

== Aftermath ==
Following John IV's acclamation, Spain declared war on Portugal and a conflict started, although the first years of the war were of low intensity, given that Spain was also involved in other major conflicts like the Thirty Years' War. By 1658, Spain's offensive increased, but Portugal's military reorganization and preparation in the years prior led to successive Portuguese victories until a peace treaty was signed in 1668.

== See also ==
- Restauradores Square
