= Fort of São Teodósio da Cadaveira, Estoril =

- Estoril, Lisbon District, Portugal
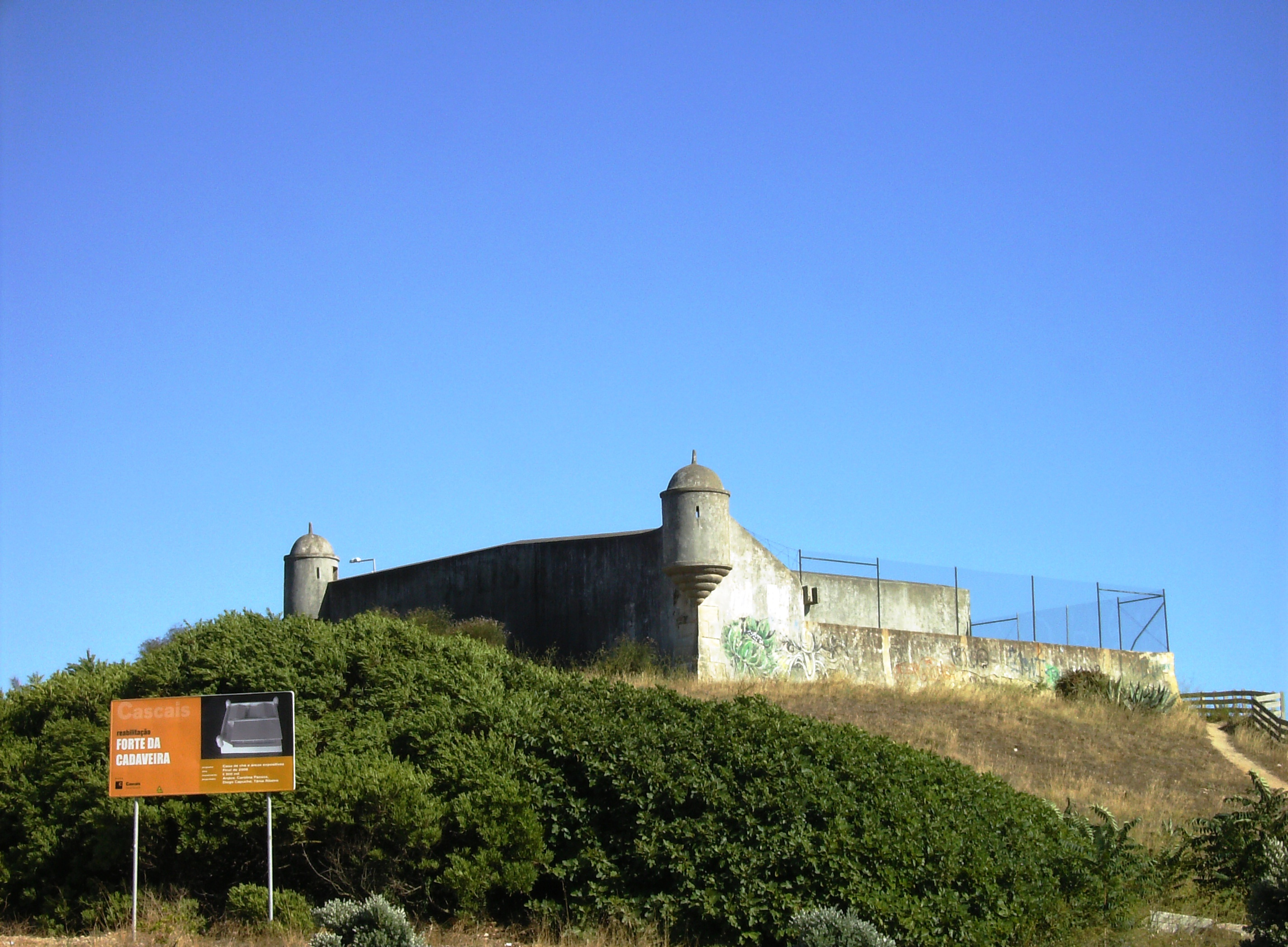

Site information
- Type: Bastion fort
- Open to the public: No

Location
- Coordinates: 38°42′07″N 9°23′28″W

Site history
- Built: 1642
- In use: disused
- Materials: Basalt

The Fort of São Teodósio da Cadaveira, located at Estoril, Lisbon District, Portugal, is one of a series of more than a dozen fortresses built between 1642 and 1648 during the period of the Portuguese Restoration War with the purpose of forming a defensive line between the Tower of Belém on the RiverTagus and Cabo da Roca on the Atlantic coast, in order to defend the city of Lisbon. Its construction began in April 1642, and was concluded the following year. Its location permitted crossfire with the nearby Fort of Saint Anthony of Barra to protect the cove of the Poça Beach. It was named in honour of Teodósio, 9th Duke of Bragança, the first-born son of John IV of Portugal.

== Design and history ==
The fort was erected under the supervision of António Luís de Meneses, 1st Marquis of Marialva. The design follows the standard layout of coastal fortifications built at that time, with a square fort divided into two rectangular spaces; one for the battery and one for accommodation. Although during the following centuries the fortress underwent improvements, the basic construction was never changed.

In the years following, works to reinforce the fort included the construction of a curtain wall outside, with a parapet all around to serve as a first line of defence. At the beginning of the 18th century, three brick houses were built on the eastern facade. Reports later in the 18th century were that the fort was ruined. However, in 1805 it served as shelter for troops trying to prevent the landing of any vessel because of the threat of cholera. During the Portuguese Civil War (1828–1834) the fort regained its importance. Restoration work began on June 3, 1831, and was carried out in one month.

After ceasing to be required for military reasons in 1843, the fort was given to the Holy House of Mercy (Santa Casa da Misericórdia) of Cascais. In 1942, after the construction of a new coastal road known as the Marginal, when some of the fort's parapets were demolished, the fort was transferred to the Portuguese Customs Authority. Some rehabilitation was carried out in 1950 and 1958 and in the 1960s the fort served as a tea house. Subsequently, it was transferred to the Municipality of Cascais, which includes the town of Estoril, with the intention that it be restored. However, as of 2018 the fort had been abandoned and had fallen into considerable disrepair.
