= Pedro José Joaquim Vito de Meneses Coutinho, 6th Marquis of Marialva =

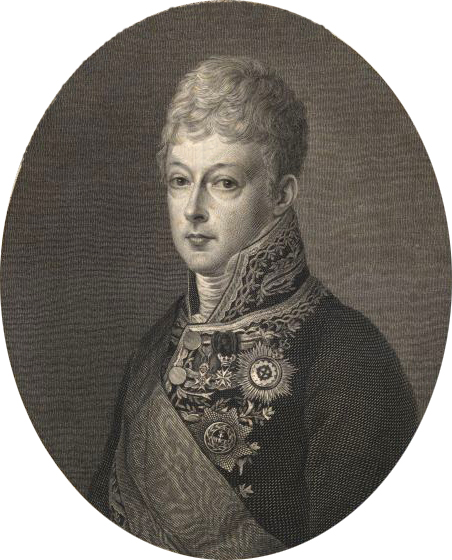
the Marquis of Marialva in 1819.

Dom Pedro José Joaquim Vito de Meneses Coutinho, 6th Marquis of Marialva and 8th Count of Cantanhede (c. 1775 – Paris, 22 November 1823), was a Portuguese military officer, diplomat, and Estribeiro-mor (Master of the Horse to the Crown).

== Biography ==
A member of one of the foremost noble houses at Court, he was the son of the 5th Marquess and Marchioness of Marialva, Dom Diogo José Vito de Meneses Noronha Coutinho, who also served as "Estribeiro-mor", and Dona Maria Caetana de Lorena, daughter of the 4th Duke of Cadaval.

=== Military career ===
He began his military career as a cadet in the Alcântara Regiment on 24 December 1786. Promoted to lieutenant and subsequently to captain in 1790, he attained the rank of major two years later. On 19 September 1796, he reached the rank of "tenente-coronel graduado" (brevet lieutenant colonel), serving as an aide-de-camp to João Carlos de Bragança, 2nd Duke of Lafões, the Marshal-General of the Army and his brother-in-law.

In 1801, as commander of the Mecklenburg Cavalry Regiment, he was responsible for preparing the unit for its participation in the War of the Oranges. Also within the military sphere, he served on the Penal Code Board ("Junta do Código Penal"), established in March 1802, and was appointed director of the Military Archive, which was created in September of that same year. He was a member of the Royal Maritime, Military, and Geographical Society for the Drafting, Engraving, and Printing of Hydrographic, Geographical, and Military Charts, established by Queen Maria I on 30 June 1798, at the initiative of D. Rodrigo de Sousa Coutinho, 1st Count of Linhares, for the purpose of creating a General Map of the Kingdom, which benefited from the collaboration of several military academies.

=== Diplomat ===
Having attained the rank of brigadier on 24 July 1807, he entered a phase of his career as a diplomat. That same year, he joined the diplomatic delegation sent to Bayonne to present formal greetings to Napoleon Bonaparte, a path taken by many members of the high nobility who did not accompany the Royal Family to Brazil, and who consequently endured the various hardships that followed.

In 1814, following the conclusion of the Peninsular War, the Prince Regent, D. João, appointed him as ambassador extraordinary to France to present greetings to King Louis XVIII. In the same capacity, he traveled to the Court of Vienna in 1822, to negotiate the marriage of Archduchess Leopoldina to the heir apparent, Don Pedro. He became noted for the luxury and magnificence he displayed during his time there. Upon returning to his post in Paris in 1823, he passed away at his "hôtel" in the Faubourg Saint-Honoré.

=== Awards ===
As the Lord of Cantanhede and Marialva, he served as a gentleman of the chamber to Queen Maria I, as well as her Chief Equerry ("Estribeiro-mor"). He held the rank of Grand Cross in the Order of Aviz and the Order of Saint Stephen of Hungary, in addition to various other honors and commendations within his House.
Possessing a refined aesthetic sense and a high degree of erudition, as evidenced by the art collection he assembled, which was sold in Paris the year after his death, the 6th Marquess of Marialva was elected a corresponding member of the Royal Academy of Sciences on 29 February 1792; an associate member on 17 March 1794; a full member of the Exact Sciences division on 7 July 1806; and, finally, an honorary member on 6 June 1812. He was also a member of the Royal Maritime, Military, and Geographical Society.

=== Issue ===
He died unmarried and without legal issue. Consequently, the House of Marialva passed to the Dukes of Lafões, following the marriage of his sister, Dona Henriqueta (1772–1810), to João Carlos de Bragança, 2nd Duke of Lafões (1719–1806).

During his lifetime, there was gossip that he might be the biological father of Prince Miguel (born 1802), from an adulterous affair with his mother, Queen Carlota This scenario was also elaborated in the 2002 Brazilian miniseries O Quinto dos Infernos, in which Marialva was played by José Wilker.
