= Forty Conspirators =

Portuguese nationalist group during the Iberian Union

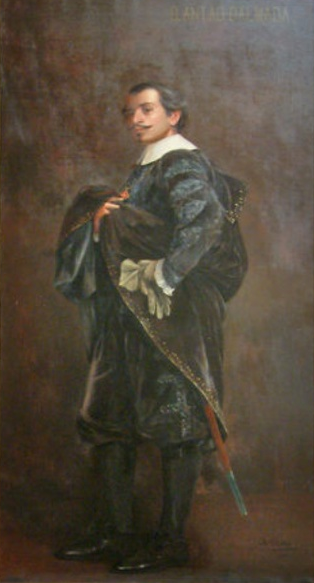
Antão de Almada, one of the leaders of the conspiracy.

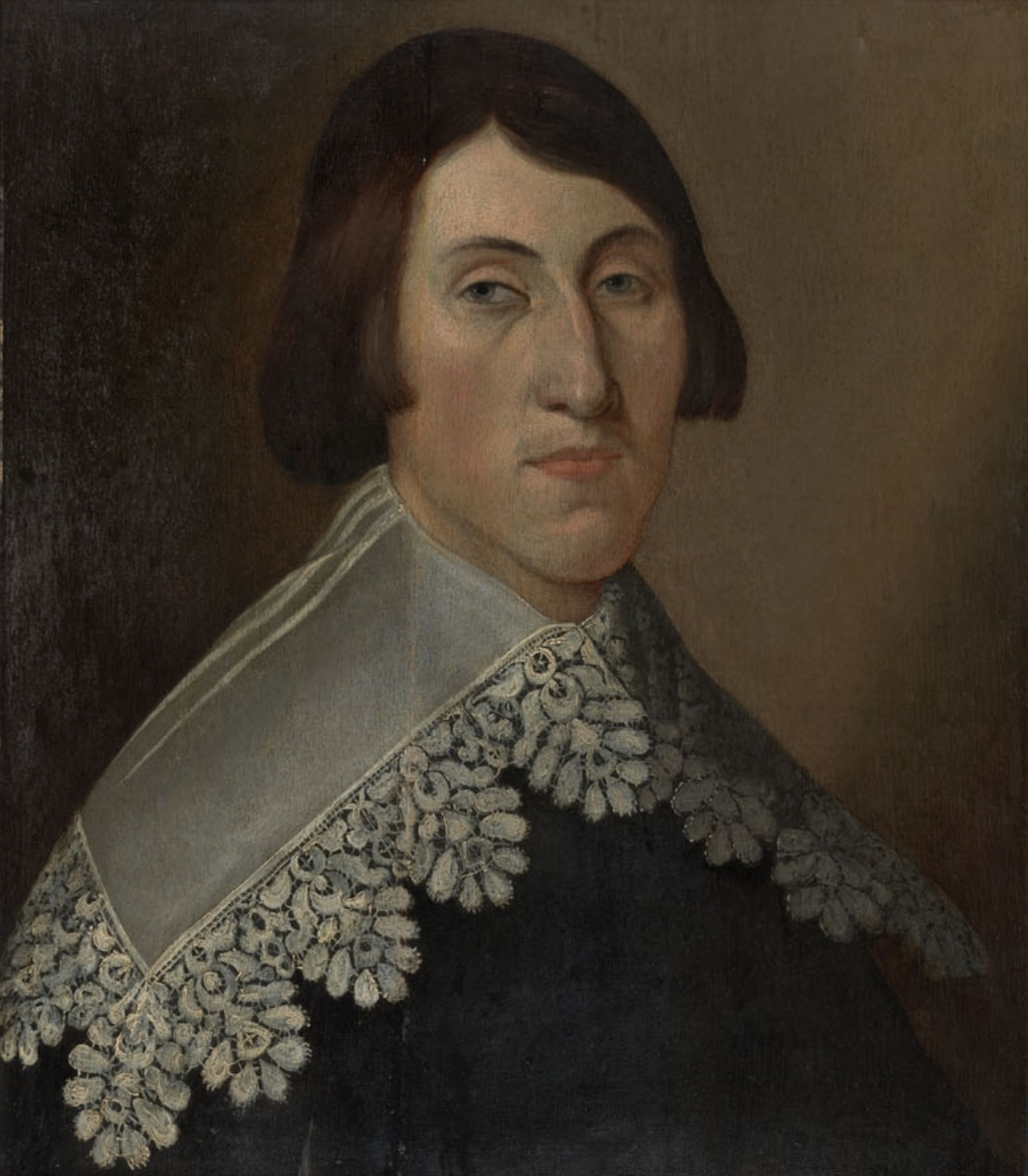
João Pinto Ribeiro

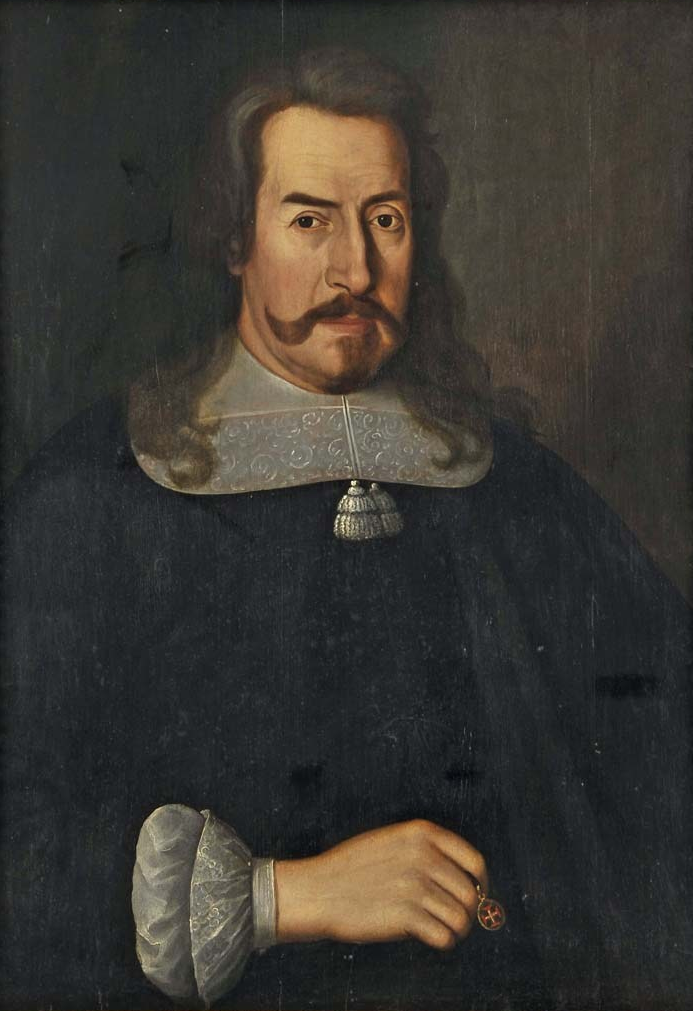
António Luís de Meneses, 1st Marquis of Marialva

Rodrigo da Cunha, Archbishop of Lisbon

The Forty Conspirators (Portuguese: Os Quarenta Conjurados), were a Portuguese nationalist group during the Iberian Union. The Conspirators were composed of forty men of the Portuguese nobility, and many clergy and soldiers. Their goal was to depose the House of Habsburg king, Philip III (and IV of Spain).

The plot was planned by Antão Vaz de Almada, Miguel de Almeida and João Pinto Ribeiro. On 1 December 1640, they, together with several associates, known as the Forty Conspirators, took advantage of the fact that the Castilian troops were occupied on the other side of the peninsula and killed Secretary of State Miguel de Vasconcelos, imprisoning the king's cousin, the Duchess of Mantua, who had governed Portugal in his name. The moment was well chosen, as Philip's troops were at the time fighting the Thirty Years' War in addition to the revolt in Catalonia.

The support of the people became apparent almost immediately and soon John, 8th Duke of Braganza, was acclaimed King of Portugal throughout the country as John IV. By December 2, 1640, John had already sent a letter to the Municipal Chamber of Évora as sovereign of the country.

== List of the Forty Conspirators ==
1. D. Afonso de Menezes, Chamber Master of King João IV of Portugal
2. D. Álvaro de Abranches da Câmara, General of Minho, member of the Council of War
3. D. Antão de Almada, 7th Count of Avranches, 10th Lord of Lagares d´El-Rei, 5th Lord and Governor of Pombalinho
4. D. António de Alcáçova Carneiro, Lord of the Majorat of Alcáçovas, High Alcaide of Campo Maior, Governor of Castelo de Ouguela
5. D. António Álvares da Cunha, Lord of Tábua;.
6. D. António da Costa, Lord of the Majorat of Mustela, Commander Order of Christ
7. D. António Luís de Menezes, 1st Marquis of Marialva, 3rd Count of Cantanhede
8. D. António de Melo e Castro, Viceroy of India, Captain of Sofala
9. D. António Teles de Meneses, Count of Vila Pouca de Aguiar
10. D. António Telo, Captain-Major of the Portuguese India Armadas
11. D. Aires de Saldanha, grandson of Aires de Saldanha (1542—1605), Viceroy of India, Governor of Tangiers
12. D. Carlos de Noronha, Commander of Marvão, President of the Household of Conscience and Order
13. D. Estevão da Cunha, Prior of São Jorge in Lisboa, Canon of the See of the Algarve, Bishop of Miranda;
14. D. Fernão Teles da Silva, 1st Count of Vilar Maior, Governor of Arms of Beira
15. D. Fernando Teles de Faro, Lord of Damião de Azere, Lord of Santa Maria de Nide de Carvalho
16. D. Francisco de Melo e Torres, 1st Marquis of Sande, 1st Count of Ponte, General of the Artillery of the Kingdom
17. D. Francisco de Sousa, 1st Marquês de Minas, 3rd Count of Prado
18. D. Gastão Coutinho, Governor of Minho
19. D. Gaspar de Brito Freire, Lord of the Majorat of Santo Estevão de Nossa Senhora de Jesus
20. D. Gomes Freire de Andrade, Cavalry Captain
21. D. Gonçalo Tavares de Távora, Cavalry Captain
22. D. Jerónimo de Ataíde, 6th Count of Atouguia
23. D. João da Costa, 1st Count of Soure;
24. D. João Rodrigues de Sá e Menezes, 3rd Count of Penaguião
25. D. João Pereira, Prior of São Nicolau, Deputy of the Holy Office
26. D. João Sanches de Baena, Fidalgo of His Majesty's Council, Judge of the Royal Household
27. D. Jorge de Melo, General of the Galleys, member of the Council of War
28. D. Luis Álvares da Cunha, Lord of the Majorat of Olivais
29. D. Martim Afonso de Melo, 2nd Count of São Lourenço, High Alcaide of Elvas
30. D. Miguel Maldonado, Clerk of the High-Chancery of the Kingdom
31. D. Miguel de Almeida 4th Count of Abrantes
32. D. Nuno da Cunha de Ataíde, 1st Count of Pontével
33. D. Paulo da Gama, Lord of the Majorat of Boavista
34. D. Pedro de Mendonça Furtado, High Alcaide of Mourão
35. D. Rodrigo da Cunha, Archbishop of Lisbon
36. D. Rodrigo de Figueiredo de Alarcão, Lord of Ota
37. D. Sancho Dias de Saldanha, Cavalry Captain
38. D. Tomas de Noronha, 3rd Count of Arcos
39. D. Tomé de Sousa, Comptroller of the Royal Household, High-Official of Festivities of the Kingdom
40. D. Tristão da Cunha de Ataíde, Lord of Povolide, Commander of São Cosme de Gondomar

== See also ==
- Portuguese succession crisis of 1580
- Portuguese Restoration War
