= Fort of Santo António da Barra =

Fort in Estoril, Portugal

Fort of Saint Anthony of Barra
- Forte de Santo António da Barra
- Estoril, Lisbon District, Portugal
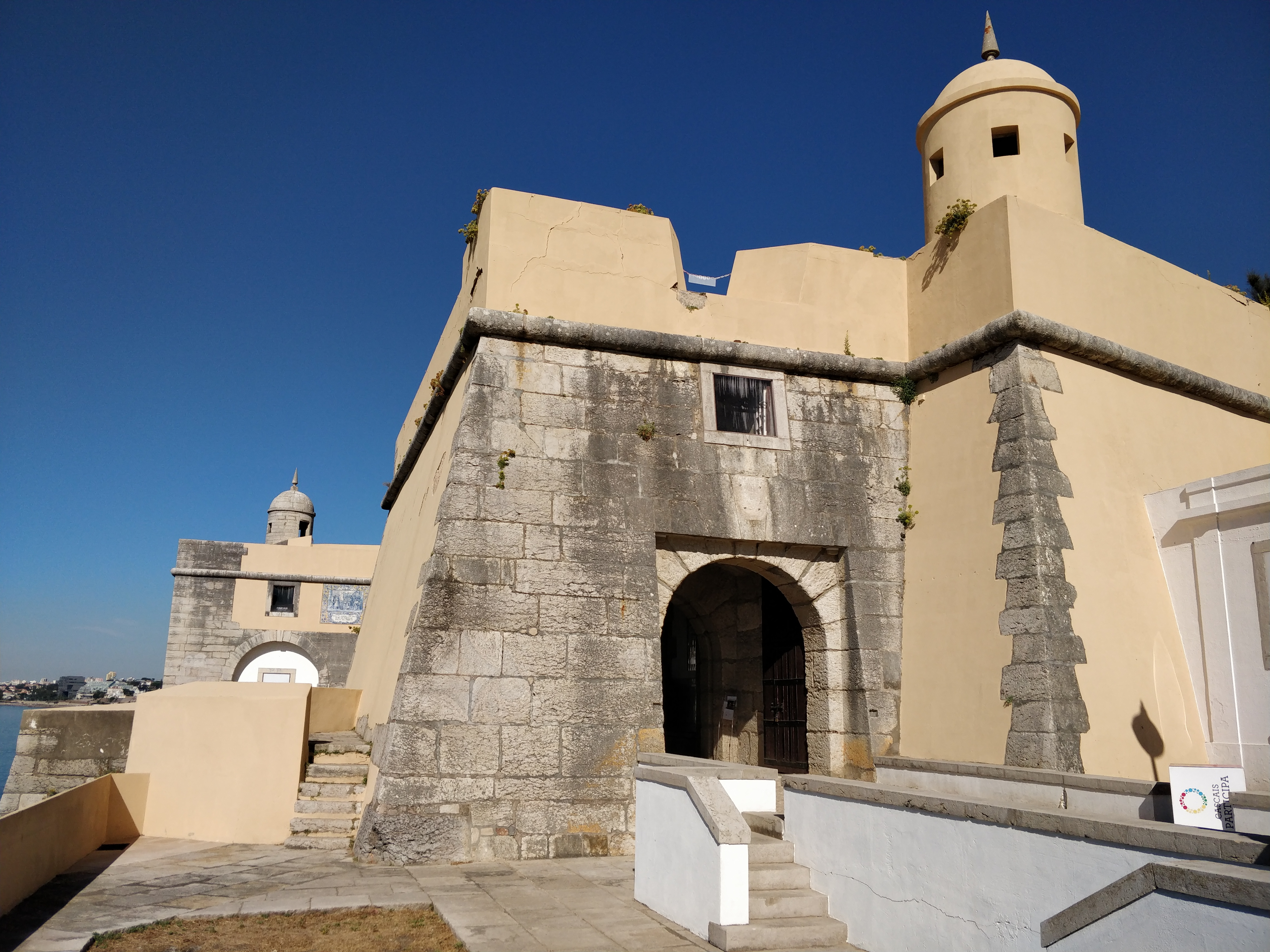
- View of the Fort of Santo Antonio da Barra

Site information
- Type: Bastion fort
- Open to the public: Weekends and holidays
- Condition: Restored in 2018

Location
- Coordinates: 38°41′54″N 9°23′03″W

Site history
- Built: 1590
- Built by: Philip II of Spain
- In use: to 2015
- Materials: Basalt

The Fort of Saint Anthony of Barra (Portuguese: Forte de Santo António da Barra) is located overlooking the sea, in the parish of Estoril, Cascais municipality, District of Lisbon, in Portugal. It is sometimes known as the Old Fort (Portuguese: Forte Velho)), or as the Fort of Salazar as it was used by the Prime Minister, António de Oliveira Salazar as his seasonal residence during the Portuguese dictatorship. Until early 2018 the fort had been disused and subject to some vandalism, but it was then restored by the Municipality and opened for public viewing for the first time on 25 April 2018.

== History ==
The fort’s structure dates back to the time of the Philippine Dynasty, when Philip I of Portugal (Philip II of Spain) commissioned the military engineer and Neapolitan architect, Giovanni Casale, to develop plans. Following the successful landing of the troops commanded by the Duke of Alba in 1580 the monarch was aware of the need to improve the defensive system on the approaches to Lisbon on the River Tagus against the threat of English and Dutch ships. The fort is laid out in a star-shaped irregular polygonal plan, with two outer bulwarks. In the center there is a square building with a chapel dedicated to Saint Anthony and vaulted barracks. There was a moat between the two outer walls. The construction took little more than a year. On 16 February 1591 the king received a letter from Casale, informing him that the castle was ready to receive soldiers and artillery.

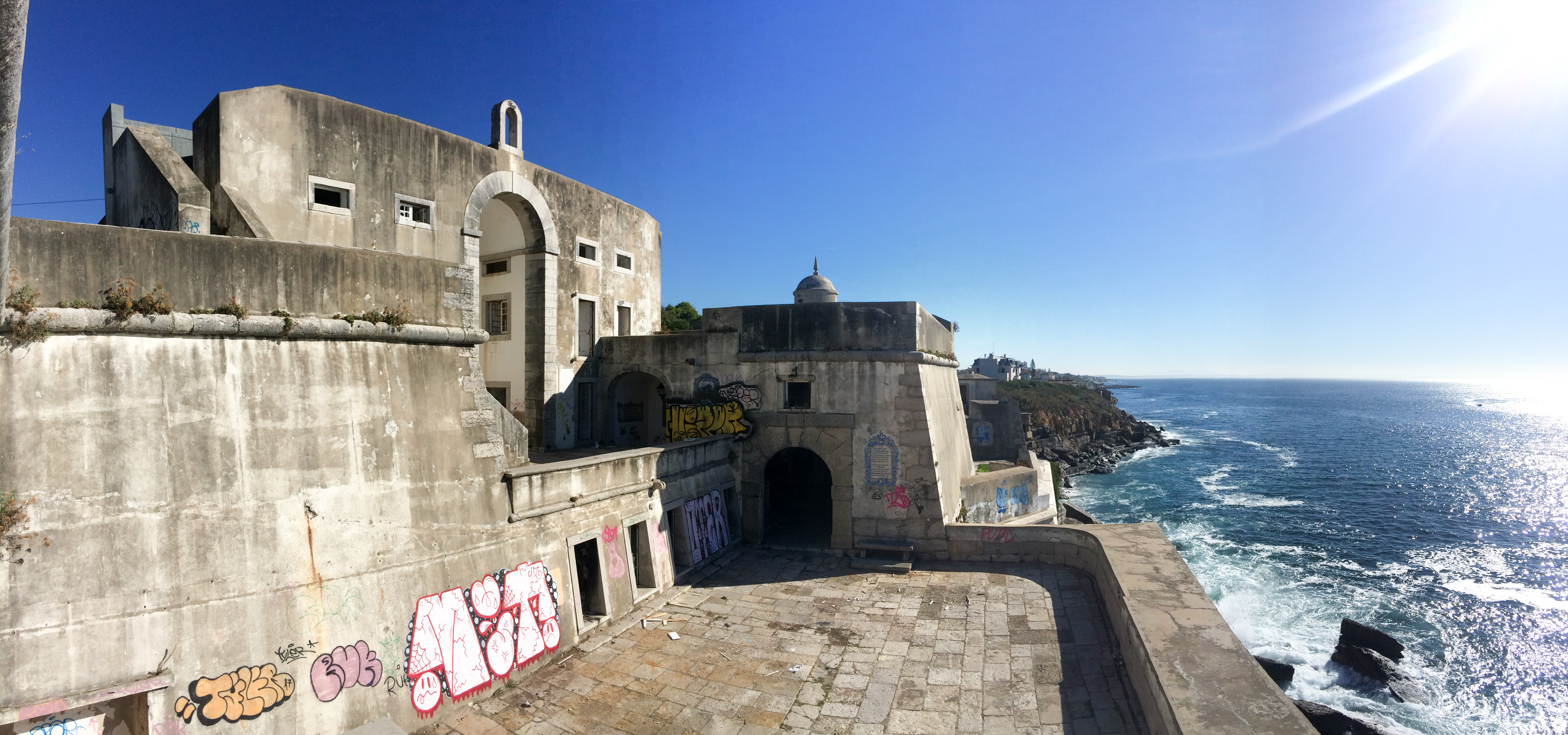
Part of the fort facing the sea, prior to renovation

After the War of the Restoration of Independence the Portuguese Crown undertook a comprehensive reform of land and sea fortifications under the direction of António Luís de Meneses, 1st Marquis of Marialva. The fort was subject to works of modernization and expansion to increase the existing firepower, in recognition of the continued improvement of both ships and the artillery on them and the need to build forts that were more resistant to the greater firepower. The fort then formed an important part of what was arguably the largest set of fortifications in the world, stretching from Belém in Lisbon to Cabo da Roca on the Atlantic coast.

The fort was heavily damaged by the 1755 Lisbon earthquake and underwent restoration in 1762-63. At the end of the nineteenth century, the fort became a customs post. From 1915, its facilities began to be used as a holiday camp of the Odivelas Institute, a military school for girls. In 1950 it became the summer residence of Prime Minister Salazar. On 3 August 1968, Salazar suffered a stroke and a fall while at the fort. A worsening in his condition would lead to the President appointing a new prime minister without telling Salazar, who, in fact, lived for a further two years.

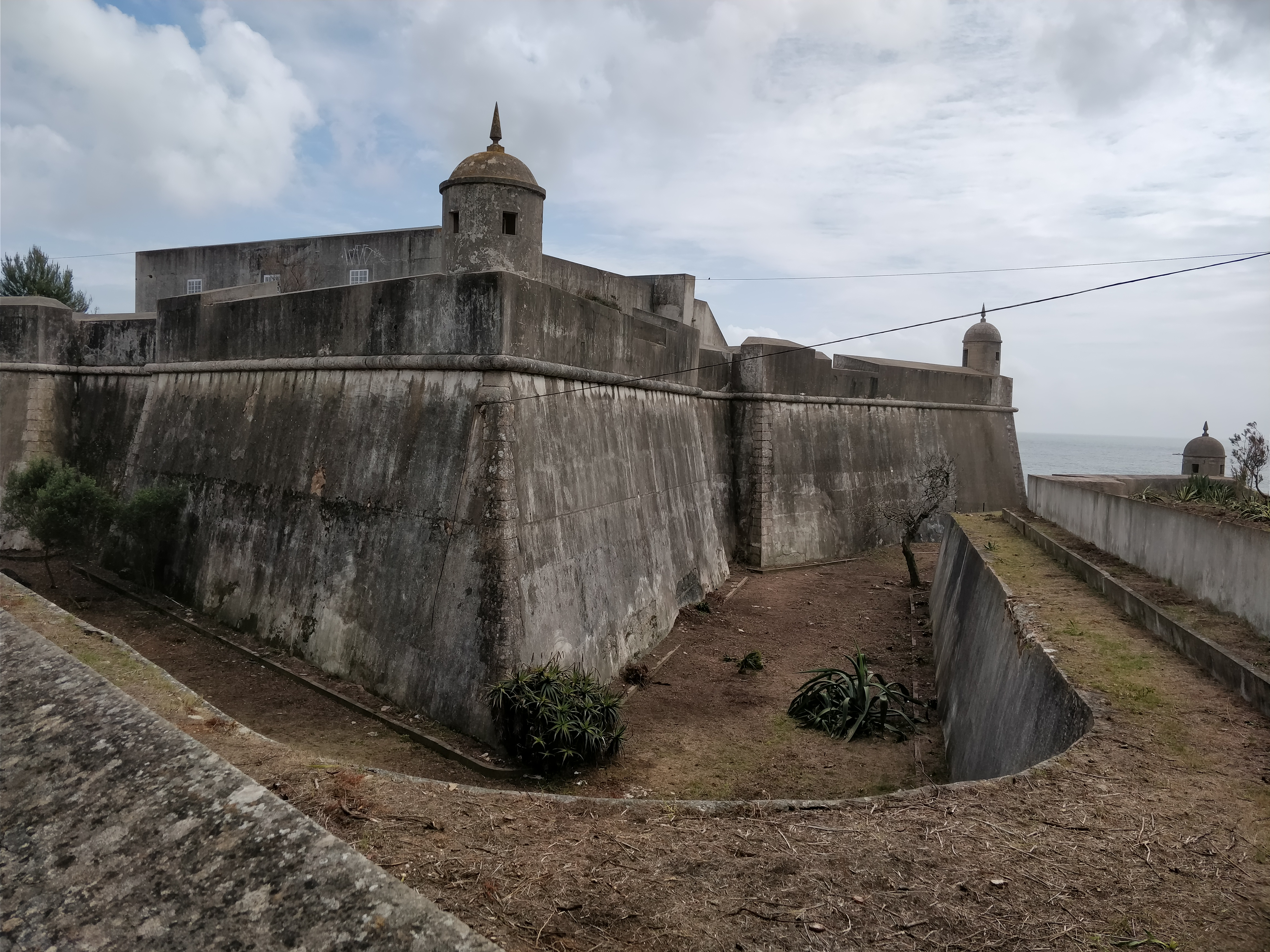
External view of St Anthony Fort, showing the moat

After the closure in 2015 of the Instituto de Odivelas, the site was abandoned. Following this the Municipality of Cascais signed an agreement aimed at transferring the site to the municipality, which intended to use it as a research centre, at an estimated cost of €6mn. The transfer finally took place in March 2018 and the fort was opened for public viewing on 25 April 2018, Freedom Day in Portugal, which celebrates the overthrow of the authoritarian regime of the Estado Novo in 1974. In 2016, a fire had been reported in one of the areas of the fort. The fort also suffered internal damage and had been the victim of significant graffiti.

== In the Media ==
The fort featured in an RTP (Rádio e Televisão de Portugal) programme broadcast in February 2018, concerning degraded national monuments in Portugal. It was recorded before restoration work was carried out.
