= Giuseppe Troni =

Italian painter (1739–1810)

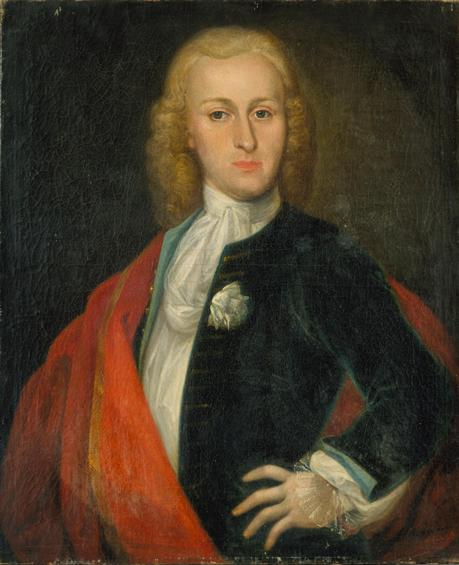
- Self-Portrait
- Patrons: Maria I of Portugal; John VI of Portugal

Giuseppe Troni (Portuguese: José Troni; Turin, 1739 – Lisbon, 1810) was an Italian court painter. He was initially a pupil of his father, Alessandro Trono, but completed his studies in Rome. He was portrait painter to the court of Naples, and later to the court in Turin.

== Portuguese court ==
In 1785, he moved to Lisbon. In Lisbon, he would become famous once he became a court painter to the House of Braganza. He would paint there many famous portraits of the kings and princes of Portugal, as well as the Portuguese nobility.

== Gallery ==
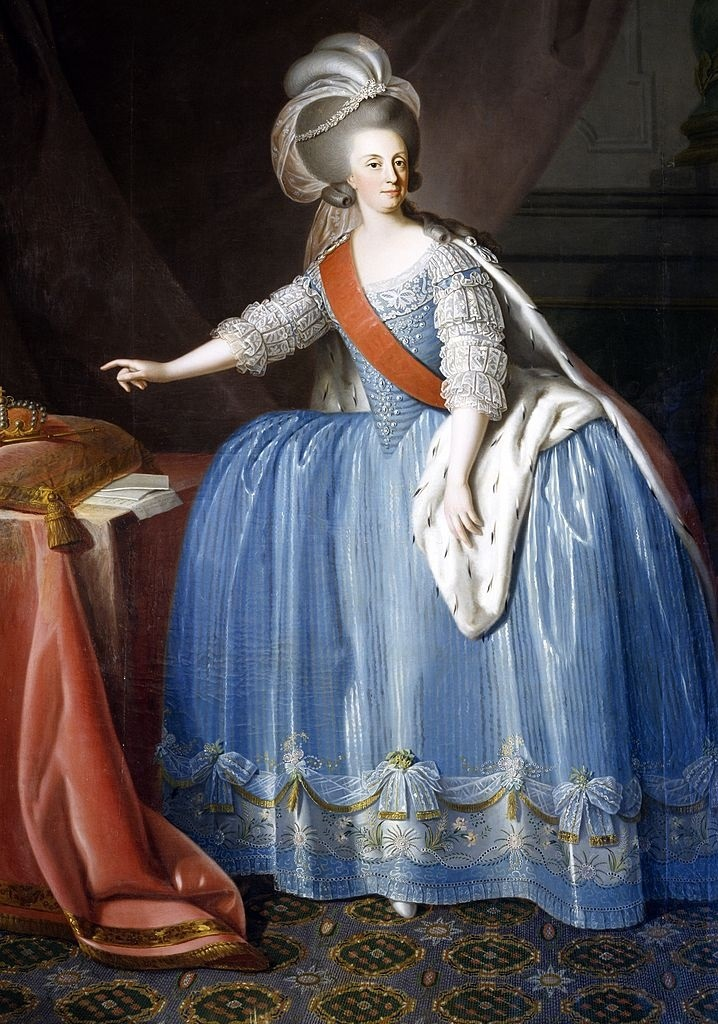
Maria I of Portugal

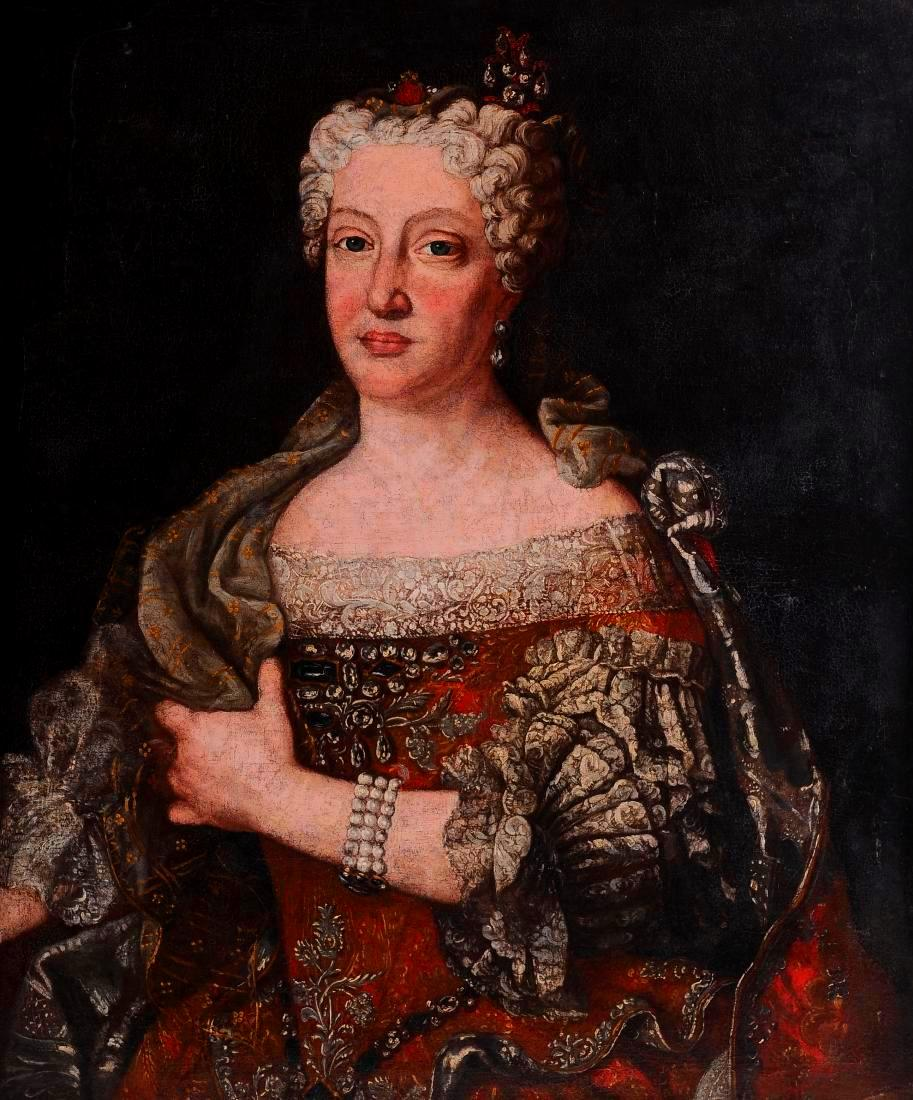
Maria Anna of Austria

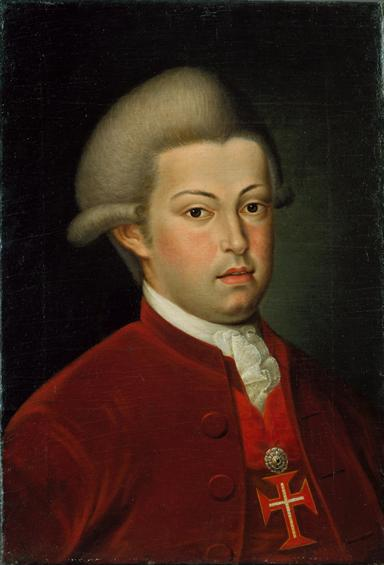
John VI of Portugal

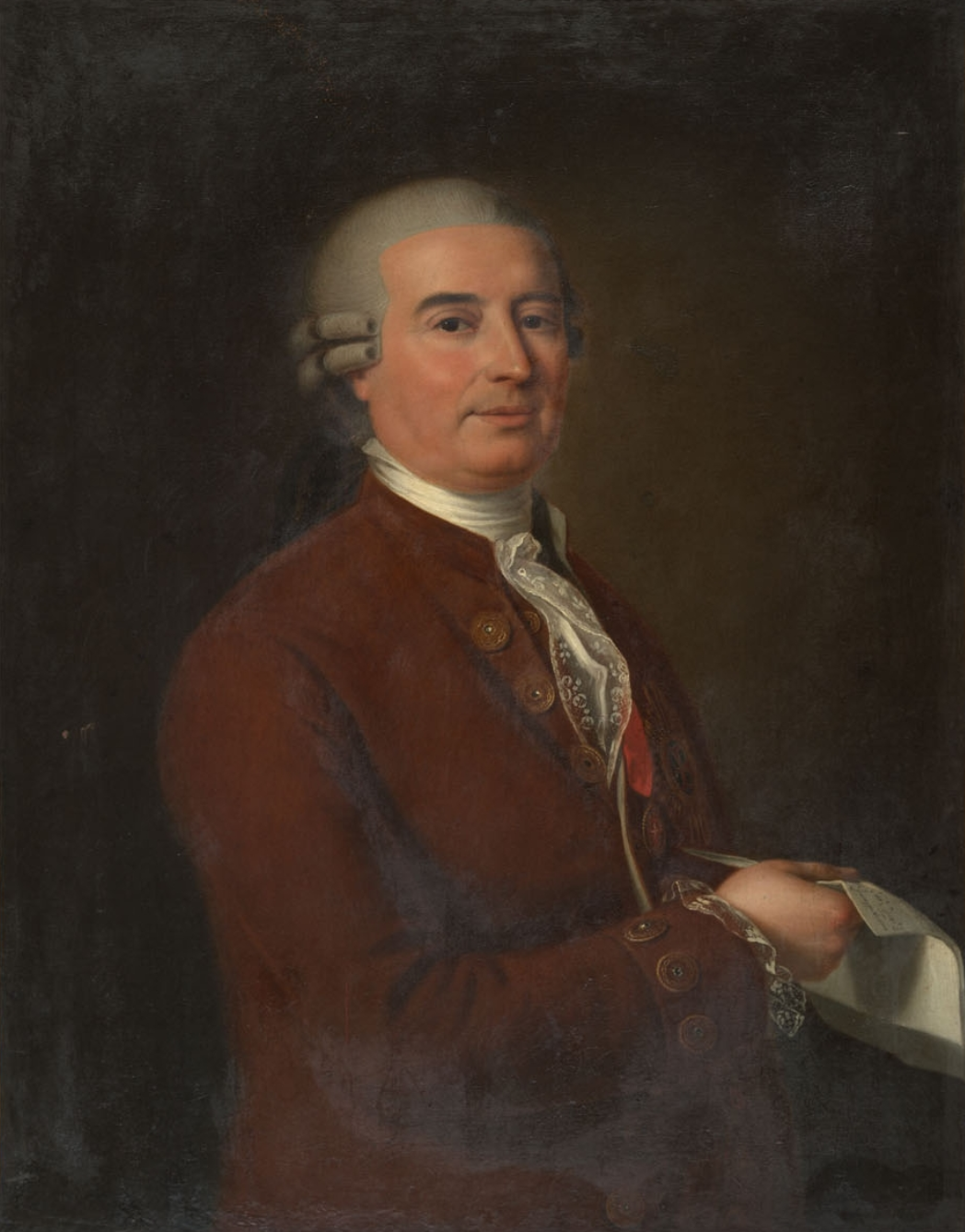
Manuel de Figueiredo; 1785

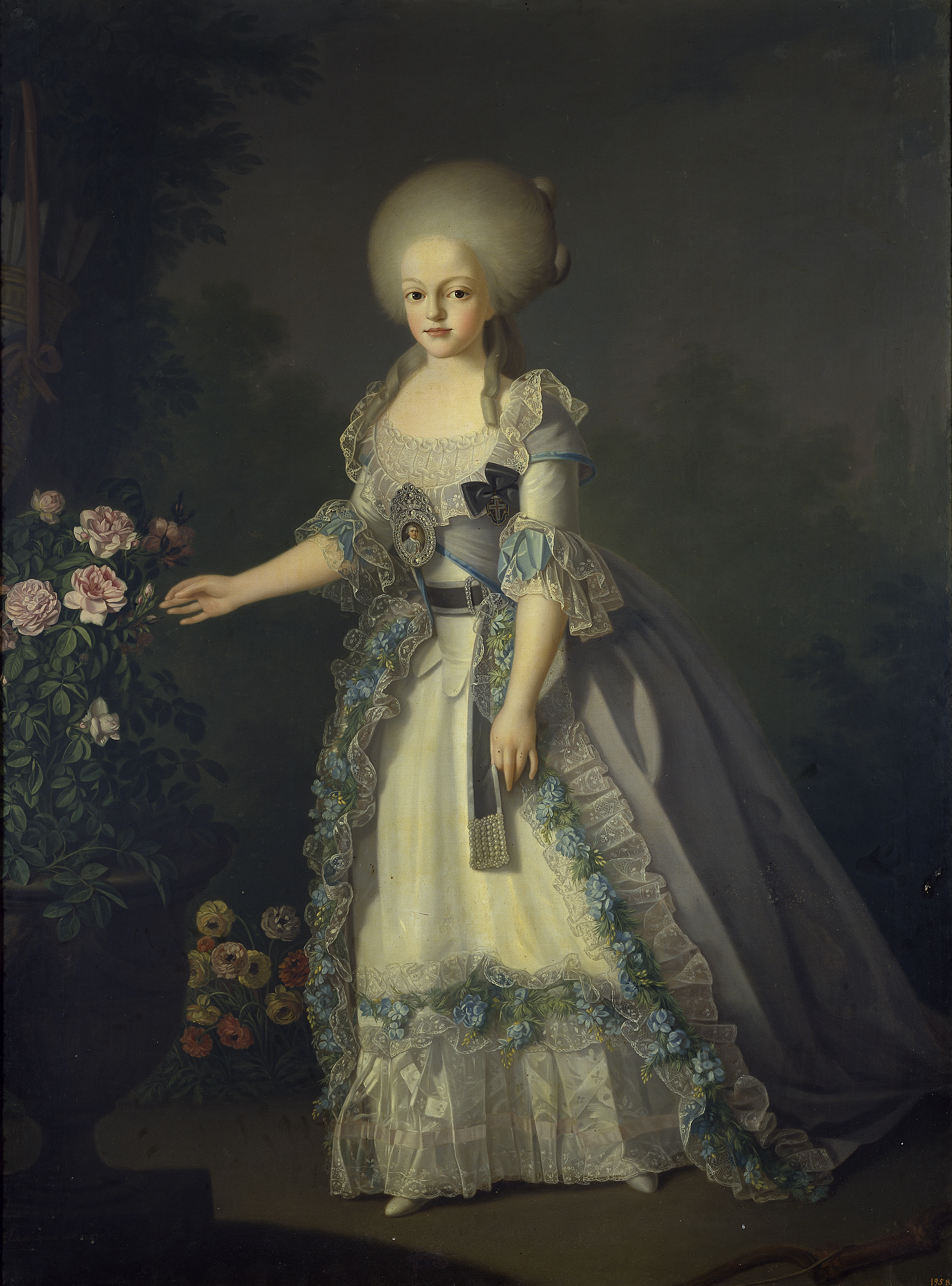
Infanta Carlota Joaquina of Spain; 1787
