= Antão de Almada, 7th Count of Avranches =

His Lordship Antão de Almada
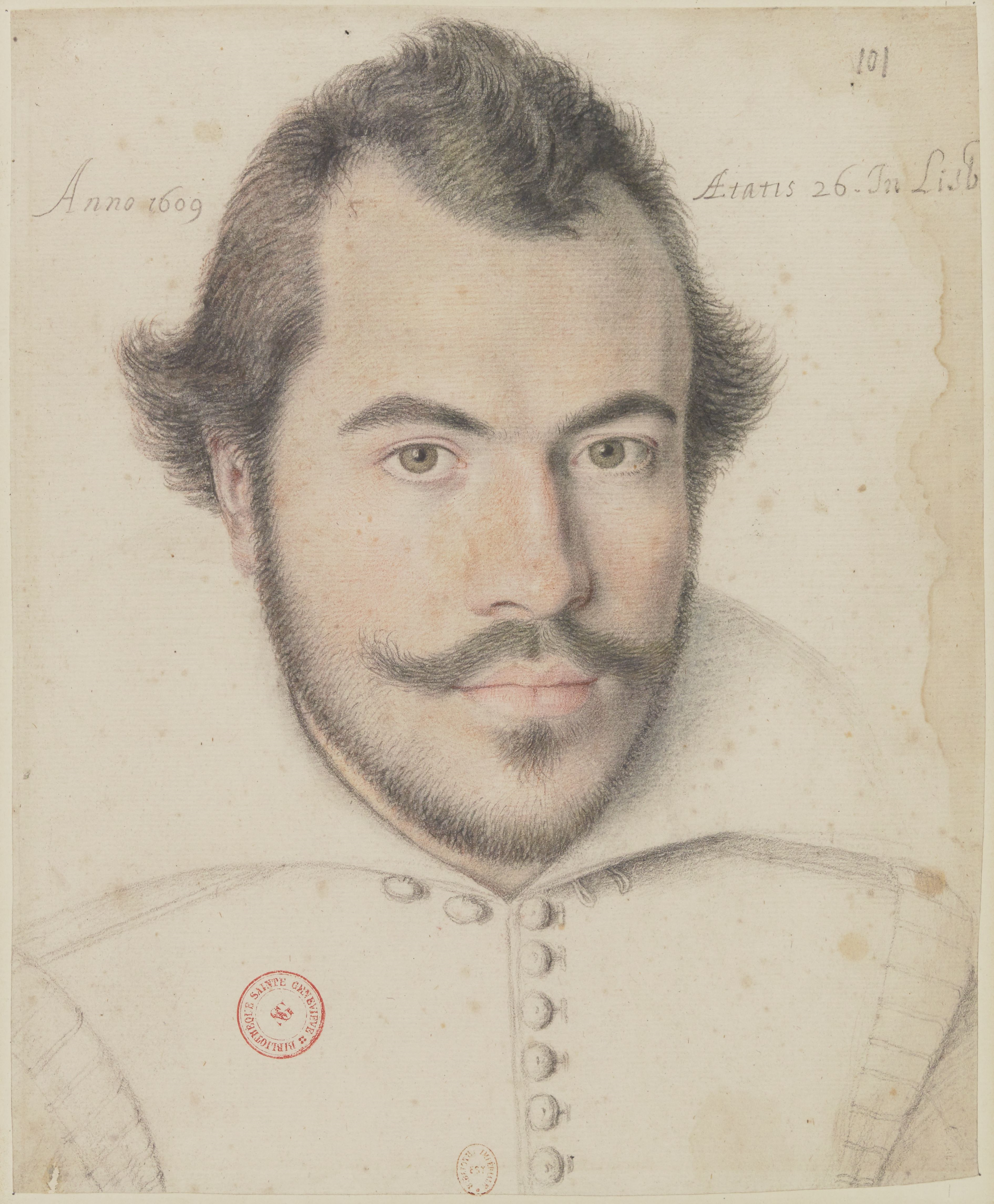
- Presumed portrait of Antão de Almada, 1609, Bibliothèque nationale de France

Portuguese Ambassador to England
- In office 1641–1642 Serving with Francisco de Andrade Leitão
- Monarch: John IV of Portugal

Personal details
- Born: c. 1573
- Died: 17 December 1644 (aged 70–71) Elvas, Portalegre, Portugal
- Spouse: D. Isabel da Silva

D. Antão Vaz de Almada (c. 1573 – 17 December 1644) is a Portuguese national hero due to his involvement in the Restoration of Independence in 1640, as one of the Forty Conspirators. During the coup d'état, he was responsible for the arrest of the Duchess of Mantua, then the Vicereine of Portugal.

In 1641–42, he was sent as ambassador to England to secure the recognition of Portugal's independence abroad.

Antão de Almada was the 7th holder of the title of Count of Avranches by virtue of inheritance under the salic law, even though he did not make use of it.
