= Marquis of Marialva =

Portuguese title of nobility

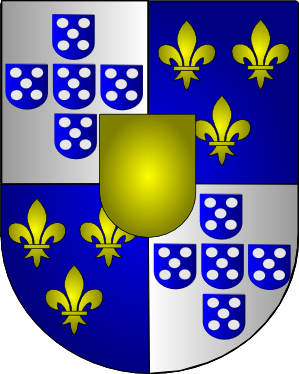
The Coat of Arms of the Menezes family, Marquesses of Marialva and Counts of Cantanhede.

Count of Cantanhede (in Portuguese Conde de Cantanhede) was a Portuguese title of nobility created by a royal decree, dated from 6 August 1479, by King Afonso V of Portugal, and granted to D. Pedro de Menezes, 5th Lord of Cantanhede.

In the 17th century this family received new honours: a royal decree of King Afonso VI of Portugal, issued on 11 June 1661, created the title of Marquis of Marialva (in Portuguese Marquês de Marialva) and granted it to D. António Luís de Menezes, 3rd Count of Cantanhede.

Once the 6th Marquis of Marialva died without issue, these two titles are today represented by the 7th Duke of Lafões, Afonso Caetano de Barros e Carvalhosa de Bragança (born 1956), descendant of D. Henriqueta Maria Júlia de Lorena e Menezes, eldest sister to the late 6th Marquis of Marialva. The title is nowadays used by D. Diogo de Bragança, uncle of the 7th Duke of Lafões.

== List of counts of Cantanhede (1479) and Marquesses of Marialva (1661) ==
1. D. Pedro de Menezes (c.1450-1518), 1st Count of Cantanhede;
2. D. Pedro de Menezes (c.1580- ? ), his 4th grandson, 2nd Count of Cantanhede;
3. D. António Luis de Menezes (1603–1675), his son, 3rd Count of Cantanhede and 1st Marquis of Marialva;
4. D. Pedro António de Menezes (1658–1711), his son, 4th Count of Cantanhede and 2nd Marquis of Marialva;
5. D. Joaquina Maria Madalena da Conceição de Menezes (1691–1740), his daughter, 5th Countess of Cantanhede and 3rd Marchioness of Marialva;
6. D. Pedro José de Alcântara de Menezes Noronha Coutinho (1713–1799), her son, 6th Count of Cantanhede and 4th Marquis of Marialva;
7. D. Diogo José Vito de Menezes Noronha Coutinho (1739–1803), his son, 7th Count of Cantanhede and 5th Marquis of Marialva;
8. D. Pedro José Joaquim Vito de Menezes Coutinho (c.1775-1823), his son, 8th Count of Cantanhede and 6th Marquis of Marialva.

== Family name ==
The family name associated with these titles was Menezes.

== See also ==
- List of marquisates in Portugal
- List of countships in Portugal

== Bibliography ==
”Nobreza de Portugal e do Brasil" – Vol. II, pages 281/284; Vol III, pages 533-538. Published by Zairol Lda., Lisbon 1989.
