= Carlota Joaquina of Spain =

Queen of Portugal from 1816 to 1826

- Empress of Brazil (titular)
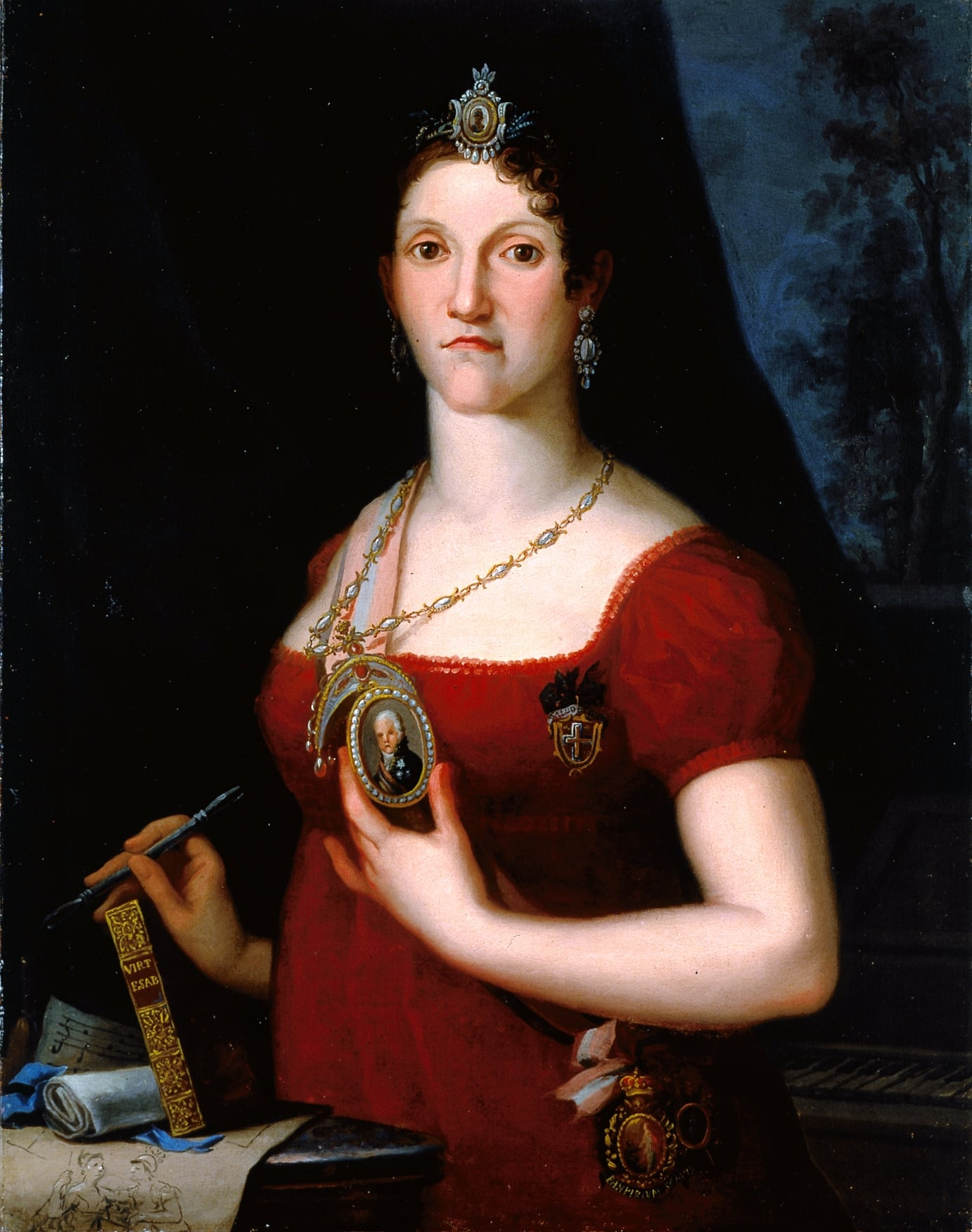
- Portrait of Dona Carlota Joaquina at the Palace of Ajuda

Queen consort of Portugal
- Tenure: 20 March 1816 – 10 March 1826

Queen consort of Brazil
- Tenure: 20 March 1816 – 12 October 1822
- Born: 25 April 1775; Palace of Aranjuez, Aranjuez, Spain
- Died: 7 January 1830 (aged 54); Palace of Queluz, Sintra, Portugal
- Burial: Pantheon of the Braganzas, Lisbon, Portugal
- Spouse: John VI of Portugal (m. 1785; died 1826)
- Issue Detail: Maria Teresa, Infanta of Spain and Portugal; António, Prince of Beira; Maria Isabel, Queen of Spain; Pedro I and IV, Emperor of Brazil and King of Portugal; Maria Francisca, Infanta of Spain; Isabel Maria, Infanta Regent of Portugal; Miguel I, King of Portugal; Infanta Maria da Assunção; Infanta Ana de Jesus Maria, Marquise of Loulé
Names
- Carlota Joaquina Teresa Cayetana de Borbón y Borbón-Parma
- House: Bourbon
- Father: Charles IV of Spain
- Mother: Maria Luisa of Parma

Doña Carlota Joaquina Teresa Cayetana of Spain (25 April 1775 – 7 January 1830) was Queen of Portugal and Brazil as the wife of King Don John VI. She was the daughter of King Don Charles IV of Spain and Maria Luisa of Parma.

Despised by the Portuguese court, where she was often referred to as "the Shrew of Queluz" (Portuguese: a Megera de Queluz), Carlota Joaquina gradually earned the animosity of the public, who accused her of promiscuity and of using her influence over her husband to further the interests of the Spanish crown. After the escape of the Portuguese court to Brazil, she began conspiring against her husband, claiming that he lacked the mental capacity to govern Portugal and its territories, and sought to establish a regency. She also harbored ambitions to usurp the Spanish throne, which was held by Napoleon's brother, Joseph Bonaparte. Following the 1817 marriage of her son, Pedro, to Archduchess Leopoldina of Austria, and the eventual return of the royal family to Portugal in 1821, Carlota Joaquina supported her son Miguel in his efforts to seize the throne. However, their relationship soured over time. Ultimately, Carlota Joaquina was confined to the Palace of Queluz, where she died on 7 January 1830, abandoned by both her children and political allies.

== Life ==
=== Childhood ===
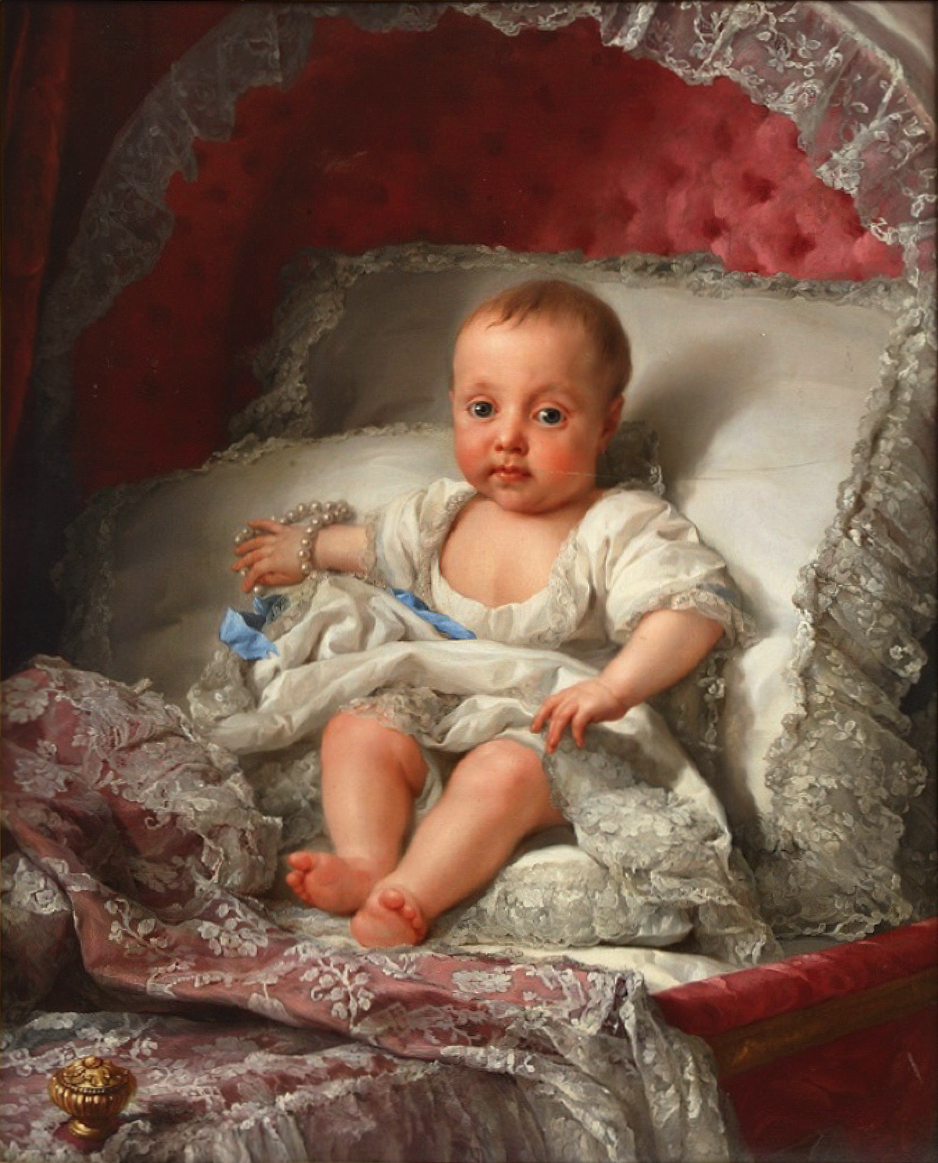
Infanta Carlota Joaquina, by Anton Raphael Mengs, c. 1775–76

Born on 25 April 1775 in the Royal Palace of Aranjuez, Carlota Joaquina was the second child of Charles, Prince of Asturias (later King Charles IV of Spain), and his wife Maria Luisa of Parma, though she was the eldest surviving offspring. She was baptized with the full names Carlota Joaquina Teresa Cayetana, but was commonly referred to simply as Carlota, a name that honored both her father and her paternal grandfather, King Charles III of Spain, who regarded her as his favorite granddaughter. Despite the strictness of her education and the formalities of court life, the Infanta was often described as mischievous and playful.

Carlota received a strict and devout Catholic education, which focused on subjects such as religion, geography, painting, and horsemanship, the latter being her favorite pastime. The Spanish monarchy’s rigid and austere principles shaped the family's upbringing and imposed strict standards of behavior and etiquette upon the entire court. King Charles III, a man of reserved temperament, devoted more attention to his family than to the festivities of court life, where his daughter-in-law, Maria Luisa, took an active role. Carlota’s mother quickly assumed responsibility for organizing entertainments at court, hosting lavish parties where moral propriety was often disregarded. As a result, the Princess of Asturias' reputation became associated with promiscuity, with rumors of infidelity and affairs with various men, including, possibly, Prime Minister Manuel Godoy, whose alleged relationship with her was widely discussed in the press. Despite the birth of a long-awaited male heir in 1784, which was hoped to secure the dynasty, Maria Luisa did not escape public disdain. She became one of the most unpopular queens in Spain, and her tarnished reputation had a profound impact on her children, particularly Carlota, the eldest daughter.

=== Marriage ===
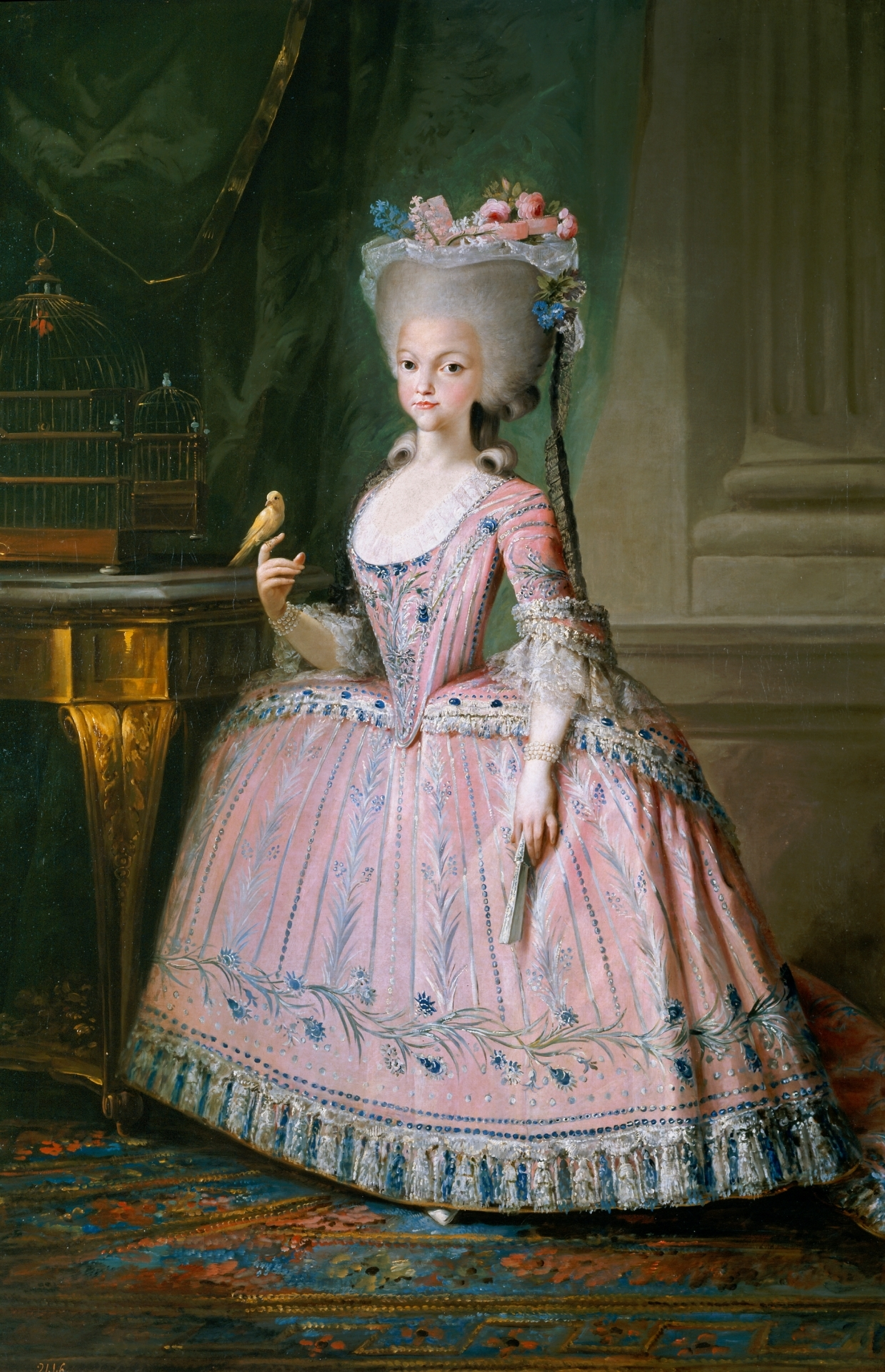
Infanta Carlota Joaquina at the time of her betrothal, by Mariano Salvador Maella, 1785

The arrangement of Carlota Joaquina’s marriage was undertaken in the late 1770s by King Charles III of Spain and his sister, Mariana Victoria, Dowager Queen of Portugal, during the latter’s visit to Spain to promote diplomatic rapprochement between the two long-estranged kingdoms. It was agreed that Carlota Joaquina would marry Infante John, Duke of Beja, the youngest grandson of Mariana Victoria, while Infante Gabriel of Spain, Carlota Joaquina’s paternal uncle, would marry Infanta Mariana Vitória of Portugal, the Dowager Queen’s only surviving granddaughter and namesake.

Carlota’s education was put to the test when she was subjected to a series of public examinations before the Spanish court and Portuguese ambassadors sent by Queen Maria I of Portugal to assess the qualities of the princess chosen to become the wife of her second son. In October 1785, the Gazeta of Lisbon published an account of these examinations:

Everything has satisfied so completely that one can not express the admiration which such a vast instruction ought to cause at such a tender age: but...the decided talent with which God has endowed this most serene Lady, her prodigious memory, understanding and that everything is possible, especially with the awakening and capacity with which the above-mentioned master promotes such useful and glorious applications.

Having demonstrated the suitability and accomplishments of the bride, there were no remaining obstacles to her union with the Portuguese prince. Accordingly, a proxy marriage was celebrated on 8 May 1785. Three days later, on 11 May, the ten-year-old Carlota Joaquina departed Spain for Lisbon, accompanied by her retinue. On the day of her departure from the Spanish court, she asked her mother to commission a portrait of herself wearing a red dress to be displayed in place of a painting of Infanta Margarita, whom Carlota Joaquina claimed to surpass in beauty. Among those included in the Infanta’s entourage were Father Felipe Scio, a renowned Spanish theologian and scholar; Emília O’Dempsy, who served as lady-in-waiting; and Anna Miquelina, Carlota Joaquina’s personal maid. The official wedding ceremony between Infante John of Portugal and Carlota Joaquina was held on 9 June 1785. At the time, the bride was only ten years old, while her husband was eighteen. Owing to Carlota Joaquina’s young age, the consummation of the marriage was postponed until 9 January 1790, when she was considered mature enough to conceive and bear children.

=== Life in the Portuguese court ===
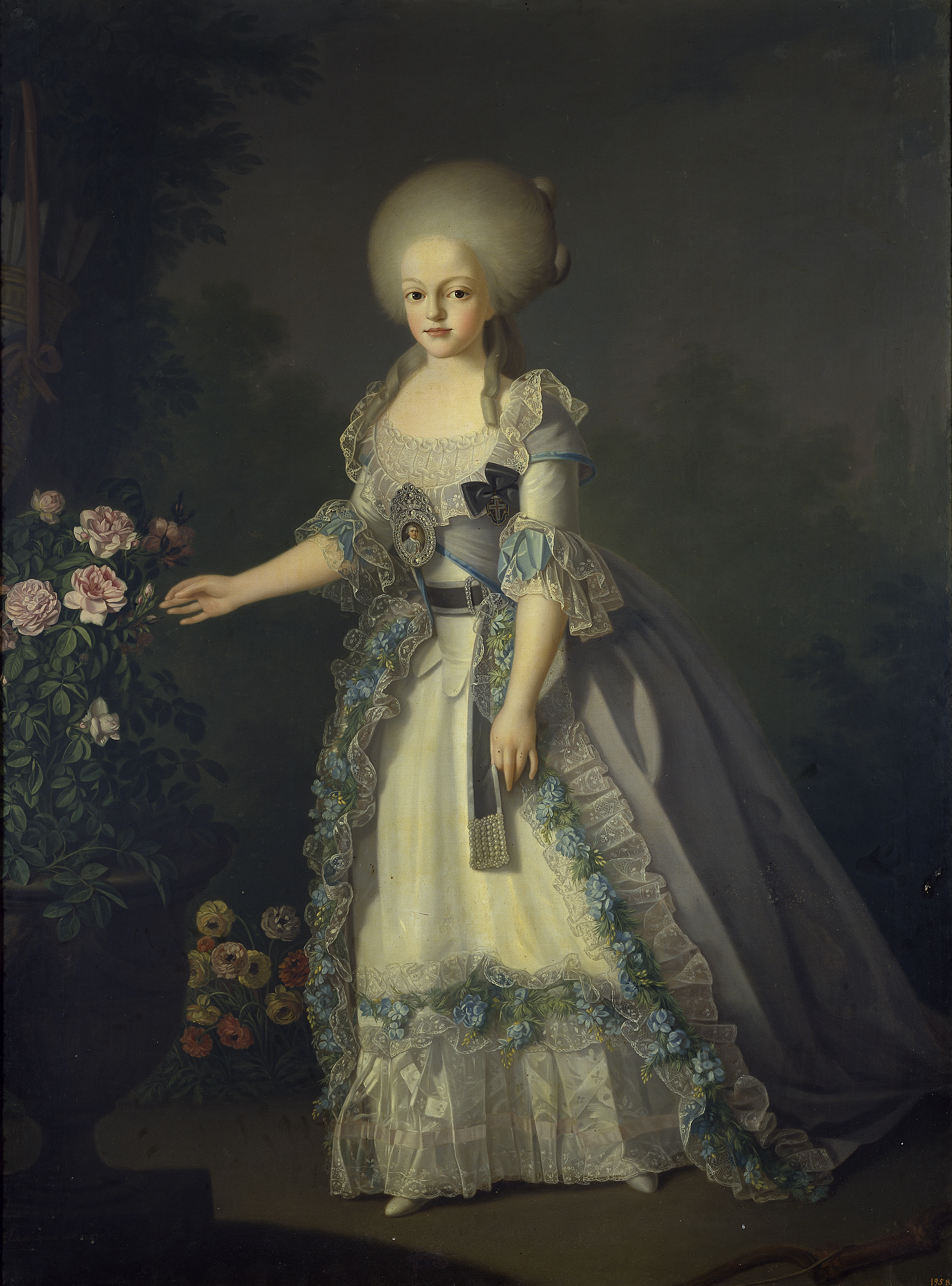
Carlota Joaquina, Duchess of Beja, by Giuseppe Troni, 1787

The atmosphere at the Portuguese court differed in many respects from that of the lively Spanish court. While in other parts of Europe court life increasingly reflected the ideals of the Enlightenment and a changing society, in Portugal the Catholic Church continued to impose strict norms that prohibited most forms of entertainment. The staging of comedies was forbidden, as were dances and court festivities. The reign of Queen Maria I was characterized by the ascendancy of a conservative faction within the Portuguese nobility and clergy, creating an environment described by the Dowager Queen Mariana Victoria, Carlota Joaquina’s great-aunt, as one of extreme monotony. As a result, Carlota Joaquina found herself immersed in a deeply religious and austere setting, in stark contrast to the extravagance and gaiety to which she had been accustomed. Nevertheless, her relationship with her mother-in-law was affectionate, as evidenced by the correspondence exchanged between them. Carlota’s natural cheerfulness and vivacity provided the Queen with rare moments of relaxation and amusement.

Her more liberal habits and customs differed markedly from those of other women at court. Adhering to traditional expectations of female conduct, Portuguese men disapproved of the ease with which Carlota Joaquina moved within public spaces, her involvement in political matters, and her perceived lack of restraint in domestic life. As most Portuguese women were largely excluded from social life, her conduct was regarded as provocative and gave rise to malicious rumors within the court. Some of these criticisms were openly prejudiced, notably those expressed by the Duchess of Abrantès, the wife of the French general Jean-Andoche Junot, who would later invade Portugal. During her stay in Lisbon, Madame Junot mocked Carlota Joaquina for both her behavior and her manner of dress, and portrayed her in highly derogatory terms, even depicting her as exceedingly unattractive:

Her ugliness, her dirty and disheveled hair, her very thin and purplish lips adorned with a thick mustache, her teeth, uneven like Pan's flute" [...] I couldn't convince myself that she was a woman, and yet I knew of facts at that time that amply proved the contrary.

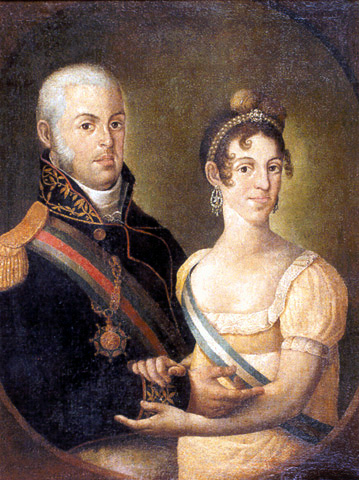
Doña Carlota Joaquina and her husband, by Manuel Dias de Oliveira

Carlota’s husband, afflicted by profound and persistent melancholy, was known to wander silently through the dark cloisters of the palace, burdened by fears of revolution and displaying little affection for his wife. Although the couple had nine children together, after the birth of their last child they appeared jointly only at official court ceremonies and thereafter resided in separate palaces. This arrangement continued even after their relocation to Brazil, where Don John and Carlota each maintained separate households: Don John lived with his mother and the princes Pedro and Pedro Carlos, while Doña Carlota resided surrounded by her daughters and the infant Miguel.

At court, persistent rumors suggested that not all nine of Carlota Joaquina’s children were fathered by Don John. In particular, it was claimed that infant Miguel was not Don John’s son; some speculated that his father was a squire in Carlota’s service, while others suggested a doctor from Lisbon. These assertions were supported by the observation that infant Miguel bore little physical resemblance to the rest of Don John’s children.

==== Princess of Brazil ====
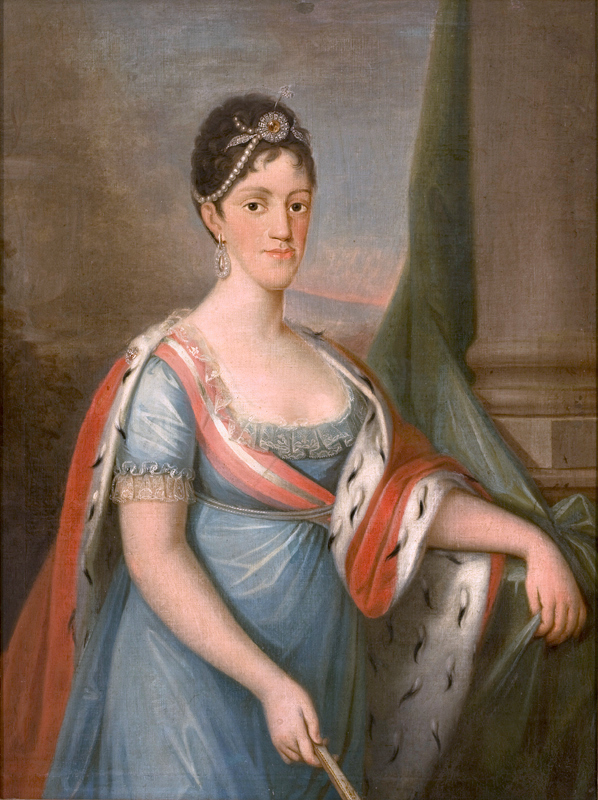
Portrait by Domingos Sequeira, c. 1802–06

In 1788, when his eldest brother Joseph, Prince of Brazil died, Infante John became the first in line to his mother's throne. Soon he received the titles Prince of Brazil and 15th Duke of Braganza. Between 1788 and 1816, Carlota Joaquina was known as Princess of Brazil as the wife of the heir-apparent of the Portuguese throne. Some scholars believe that her disdain for Brazil led to behaviors that alienated her from both the people and her husband.

After Queen Maria I was declared insane in 1792, Prince John took over the government in her name, even though he only took the title of Prince Regent in 1799. This change in events suited Carlota Joaquina's ambitious and sometimes malevolent nature. In the Portuguese court she would interfere frequently in matters of state, trying to influence the decisions of her husband; these attempts to meddle in politics displeased the Portuguese nobility and even the population.

Because she was often excluded from government decisions, Carlota Joaquina organized a plot (Conspiração do Alfeite) with the intention to take the reins of power from the Prince Regent. She planned to have him arrested, declaring that, like his mother, he was incapable of rule.

The Palace of Queluz, where Carlota was exiled and came to be known by the epithet "the Shrew of Queluz"

However, in 1805 this plot was discovered. The Count of Vila Verde proposed the opening of an investigation and the arrest of all those involved, but Carlota Joaquina was saved because her husband, wishing to avoid a public scandal, opposed her arrest, preferring to confine his wife to Queluz Palace and Ramalhão Palace, while he himself moved to Mafra Palace, effectively separating from her. It was during this period that she came to be known as "the Shrew of Queluz" (Portuguese: a Megera de Queluz).

=== In Brazil ===
==== Background ====
By the end of 1806, the international situation was approaching a critical juncture. France had imposed the Continental Blockade, aiming to isolate Britain from its allies and disrupt its trade network. At the same time, the invasion of the Kingdom of Portugal and the potential deposition of its monarch appeared imminent, and armed resistance was deemed futile against the overwhelming strength of the enemy. Consequently, by mid-1807, the idea of relocating the royal family and the court to Brazil was revived—an option that had been considered during previous crises.

In July 1807, the Treaties of Tilsit, between France and Russia, and Fontainebleau, between France and Spain, were signed, outlining the conquest and partition of Portugal. Regarding the Treaty of Fontainebleau, Carlota wrote to her father, expressing her distrust of the alliance with the French emperor:

[…] How can Your Majesty trust the said [Napoleonic] Government? It is evident that while he congratulates with one hand, with the other he plots his own downfall!

==== Flight to Brazil ====
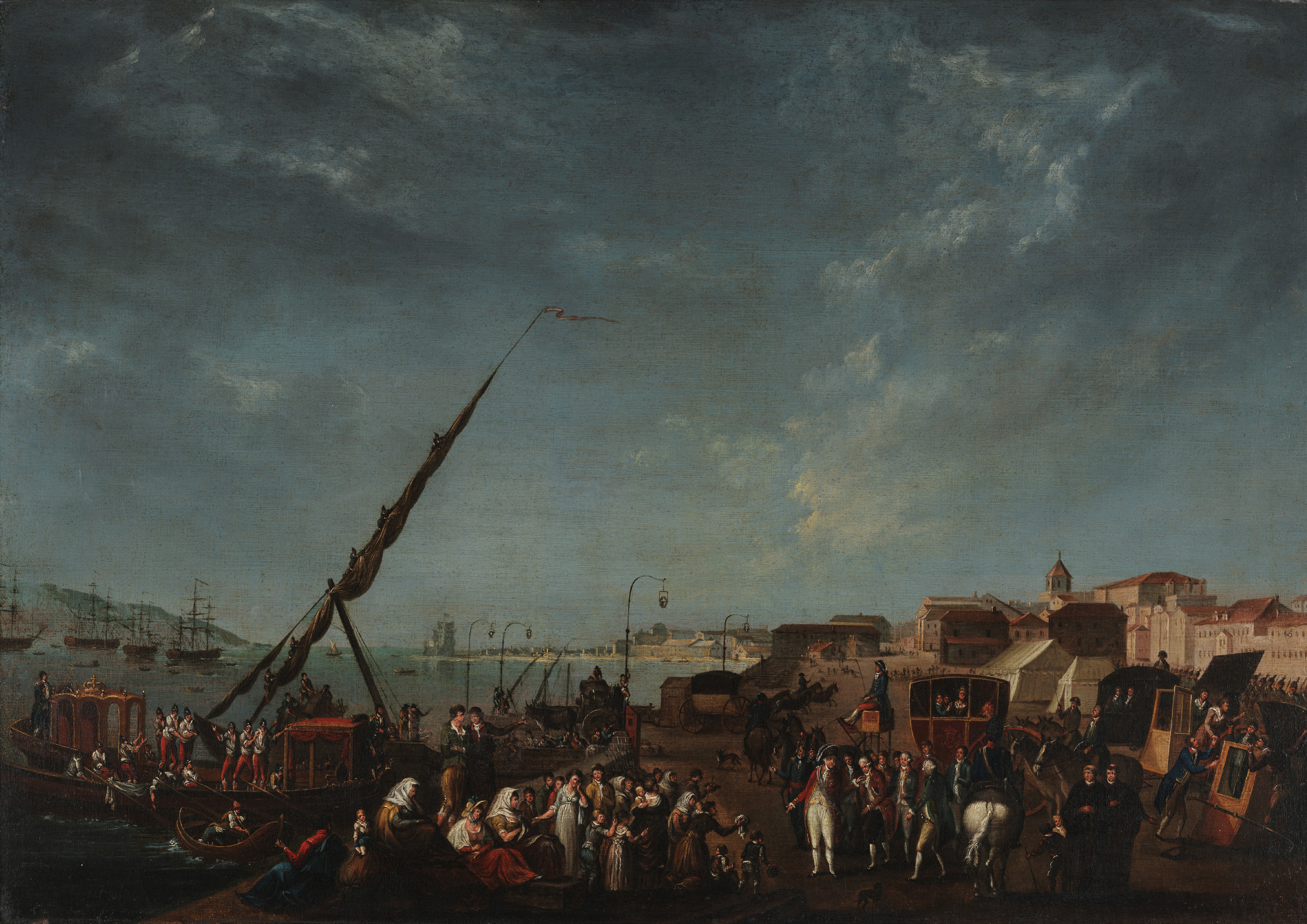
The Embarkation of the Portuguese Royal Family to Brazil in 1807, 19th-century painting attributed to Nicolas-Louis-Albert Delerive. National Coach Museum, Lisbon, Portugal

In 1808, Napoleon Bonaparte’s French forces advanced toward Portugal via Carlota Joaquina’s native Spain. To prevent the Braganza dynasty from being usurped by the Bonapartes, the Portuguese court was transferred to Brazil.

In the meantime, Doña Carlota implores her father to receive her in Spain, together with her daughters, and to spare them the fate of being sent to Brazil. However, her own father refuses her request.

On 29 November 1807, the Portuguese royal family embarked for Brazil from the Belém docks. The Prince Regent boarded the ship Príncipe Real, accompanied by the Infante of Spain, Pedro Carlos, while Princess Carlota boarded the Reina de Portugal with her daughters and ladies-in-waiting. As Queen Maria I’s carriage traveled at high speed to avoid public demonstrations, she reportedly exclaimed, Como fugir e sem ter lutado? Não corra tanto, eles vão pensar que estamos fugindo (“How can we flee without having fought? Don’t run so fast, they will think we are fleeing”). During the transatlantic voyage, Doña Carlota and her daughters were compelled to shave their heads and wear white muslin caps due to a lice infestation on board. The fleet arrived in Rio de Janeiro on 27 February 1808, where Carlota Joaquina is said to have remarked, Que horror. Antes Luanda, Moçambique ou Timor (“What a horror! I would rather go to Luanda, Mozambique, or Timor”).

==== In Rio de Janeiro ====
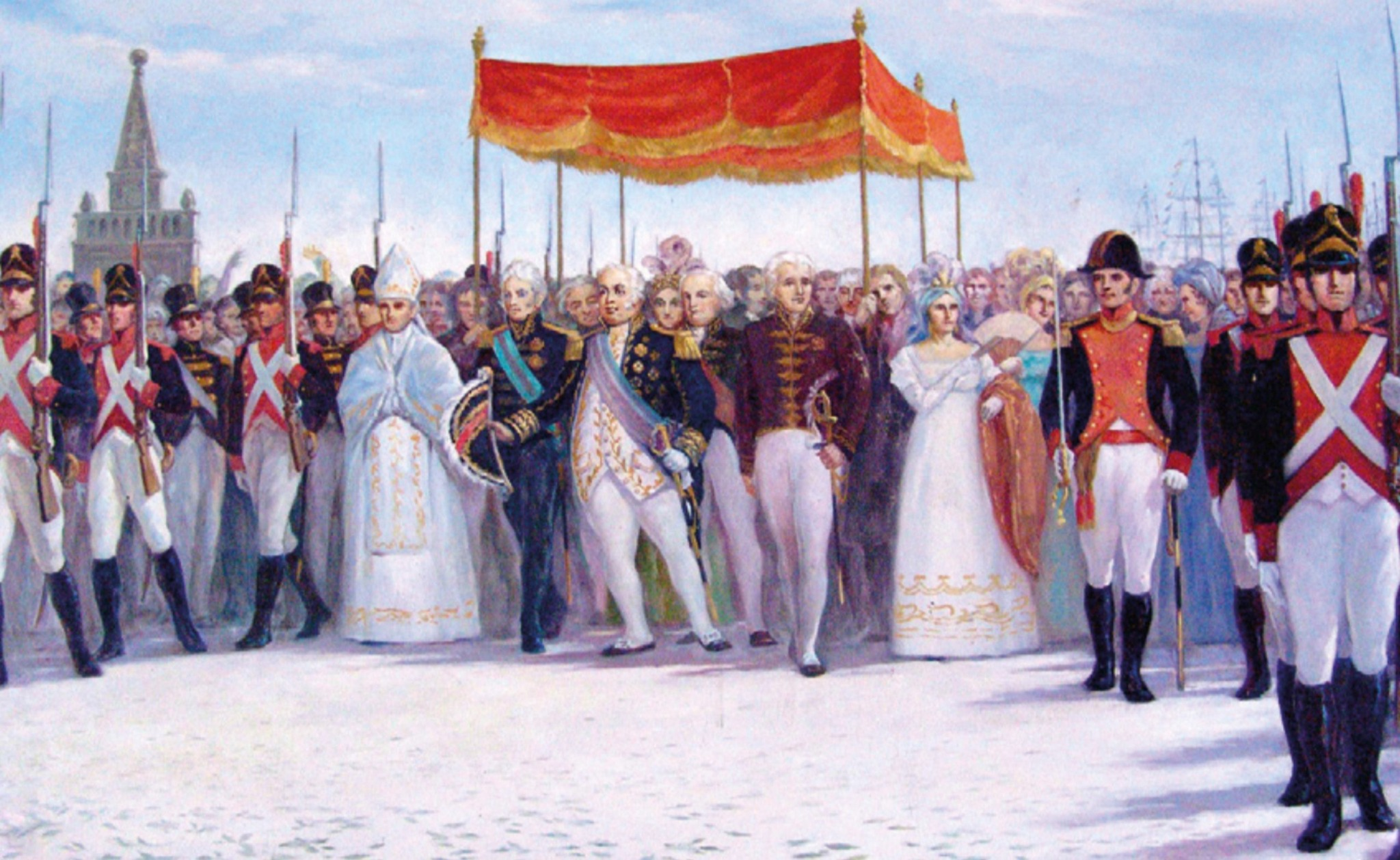
Landing of the Portuguese court in Rio de Janeiro, March 7, 1808. Naval Museum, Rio de Janeiro

During her stay in Rio de Janeiro, from 1808 to 1821, a period in which Don John was able to govern the Portuguese Empire directly, Doña Carlota revealed many aspects of her complex personality.

While in Rio, Doña Carlota resided in Botafogo and was known to bathe nude in the cove’s waters. She also frequently spent her afternoons on the veranda of her Botafogo residence, smoking diamba, usually provided by her favorite Negro slave, Felisbino, and preparing mixtures of fruit and alcohol reminiscent of what is now known as the caipirinha.

Although she reportedly dismissed Brazil as a land of “Negros and lice,” Doña Carlota is said to have developed a relationship with a wealthy Afro-Brazilian entrepreneur, José Fernando Carneiro Leão, whose wife, Gertrudes Pedra Carneiro Leão, was suspiciously murdered in Rio de Janeiro in 1820. Some scholars have suggested that Carlota may have been involved in the assassination, though definitive evidence remains lacking.

In 1816, Queen Maria I of Portugal passed away, and her son, Don John, ascended the throne as King John VI of Portugal, Brazil, and the Algarves, with Carlota Joaquina becoming queen consort.

==== The La Plata Question ====
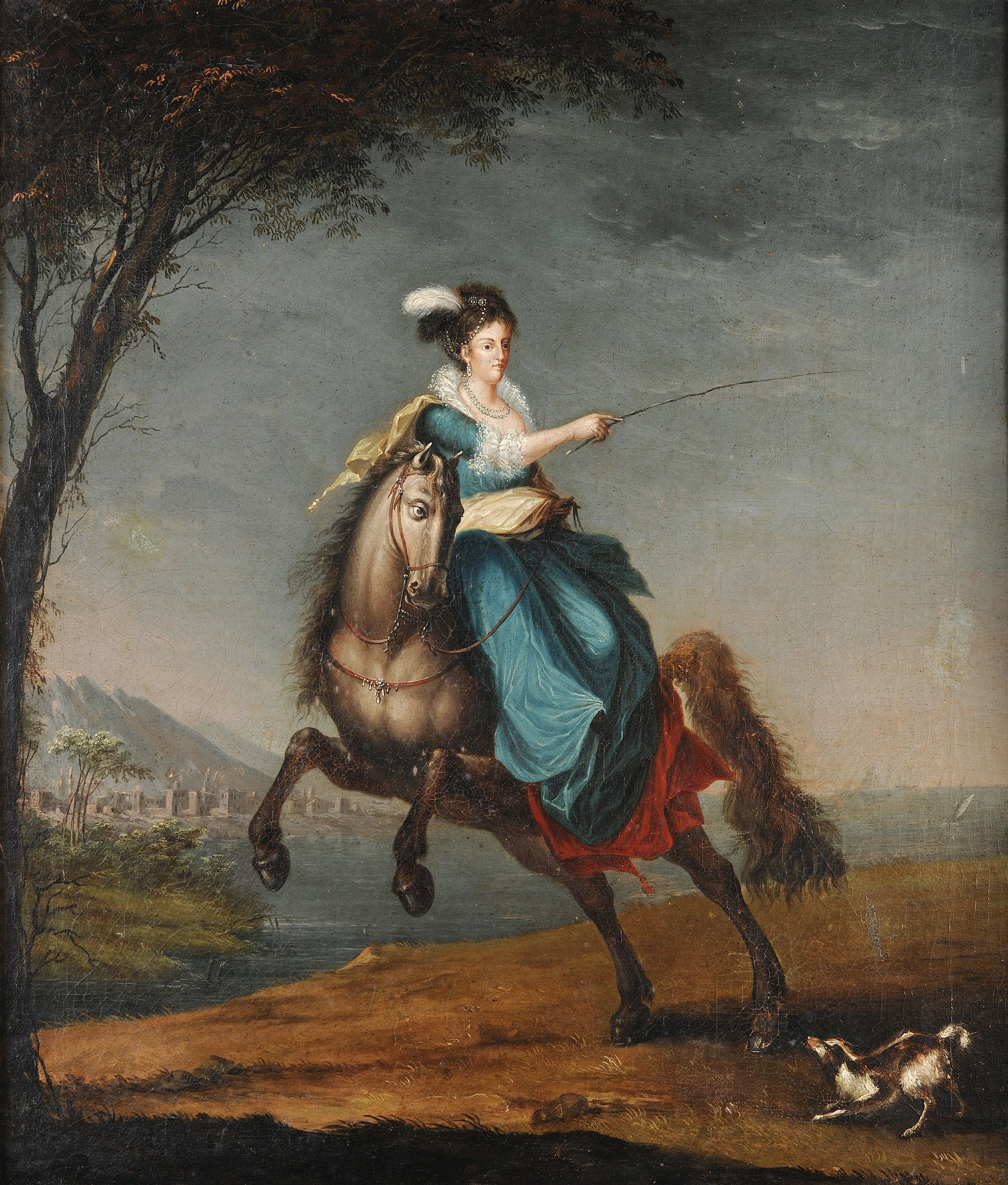
Queen Carlota Joaquina equestrian portrait in display at the Imperial Museum of Brazil

After the Napoleonic invasion of Spain, King Don Ferdinand VII, Carlota's younger brother, was forced to abdicate the throne in favor of Joseph Bonaparte. The majority of Spaniards did not recognize him as a legitimate king, and Carlota, an ambitious woman, appeared to be a possible contender to claim the throne. At the time, Carlota was in the Americas following the transfer of the Portuguese court to Brazil due to Napoleon's invasion of Portugal. Carlota would reign over the Spanish colonies in the Río de la Plata, in opposition to the metropolis ruled by a Bonaparte. This movement, that took place between 1808 and 1812, became known as Carlotismo, a political movement aimed at establishing an independent monarchy in the Viceroyalty of the Río de la Plata, with Carlota Joaquina as its monarch.

Don John viewed Carlota's ambitious plan as a threat to both Portugal and Brazil, and did everything in his power to thwart her proposal. In May 1809 Don John managed to destroy her project by dismissing the British ambassador Lord Strangford, a supporter of Carlota who had agreed to transport her to Buenos Aires. Upon fulfillment of this request, Smith withdrew and was replaced by Admiral de Courcy. However, significant differences persisted within the government itself. Don John, therefore, yielded and requested that his demands not be opposed, provided they were not impossible to meet. Ultimately, the Queen's plans were thwarted, but she did not falter. She sought to ingratiate herself with the Spanish and, in the absence of her father, King Don Charles IV, and her brother, who were prisoners in France, aimed to be appointed regent of Spain, potentially becoming the heir to Charles IV by abolishing the Salic Law. To pursue this project, she had to engage in a fierce struggle with the British ambassador, employing cunning to convince the Regency government to secretly send supplies and money to General Elío, who was in Montevideo, even resorting to selling her jewels to finance it. In the end, however, and given the complexity of the various twists and turns of this battle of pride and ambition, the dream dissipated.

=== Return to Portugal ===
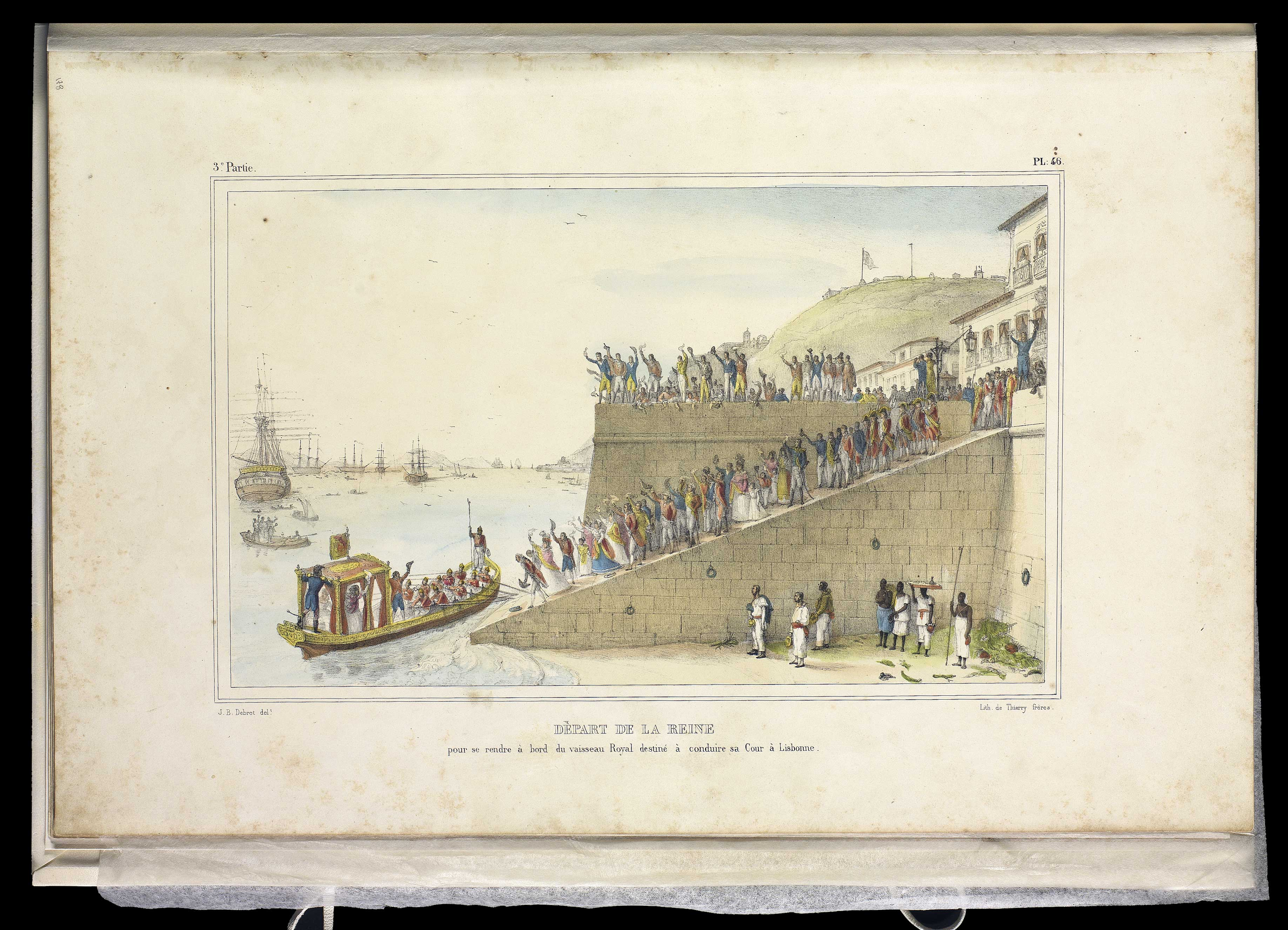
Departure of the Queen: to board the Royal ship designated to transport her Court to Lisbon, by Firmin Didot

In August of 1820, the Liberal Revolution in Portugal called for profound changes to the absolutist regime, with the aim of establishing a constitutional monarchy. One of the main demands of the revolt was for King John VI to return to Portugal, as he had been in Brazil since 1807.

On April 26, 1821, she embarked on the journey back to Portugal. According to the Viscount of Porto Seguro, "The emotions of the king and the royal family upon leaving Brazil were revealed in the tears of everyone, except the queen." Carlota Joaquina left very happily, as she had never enjoyed living in Brazil.

It is reported that, upon departing Brazil, Carlota shook her shoes to ensure that not a single grain of dust from the country would accompany her, stating, Desta terra eu não levo nem o pó ("I shall not take even the dust of this land").

==== Supporter of Absolute Monarchy ====
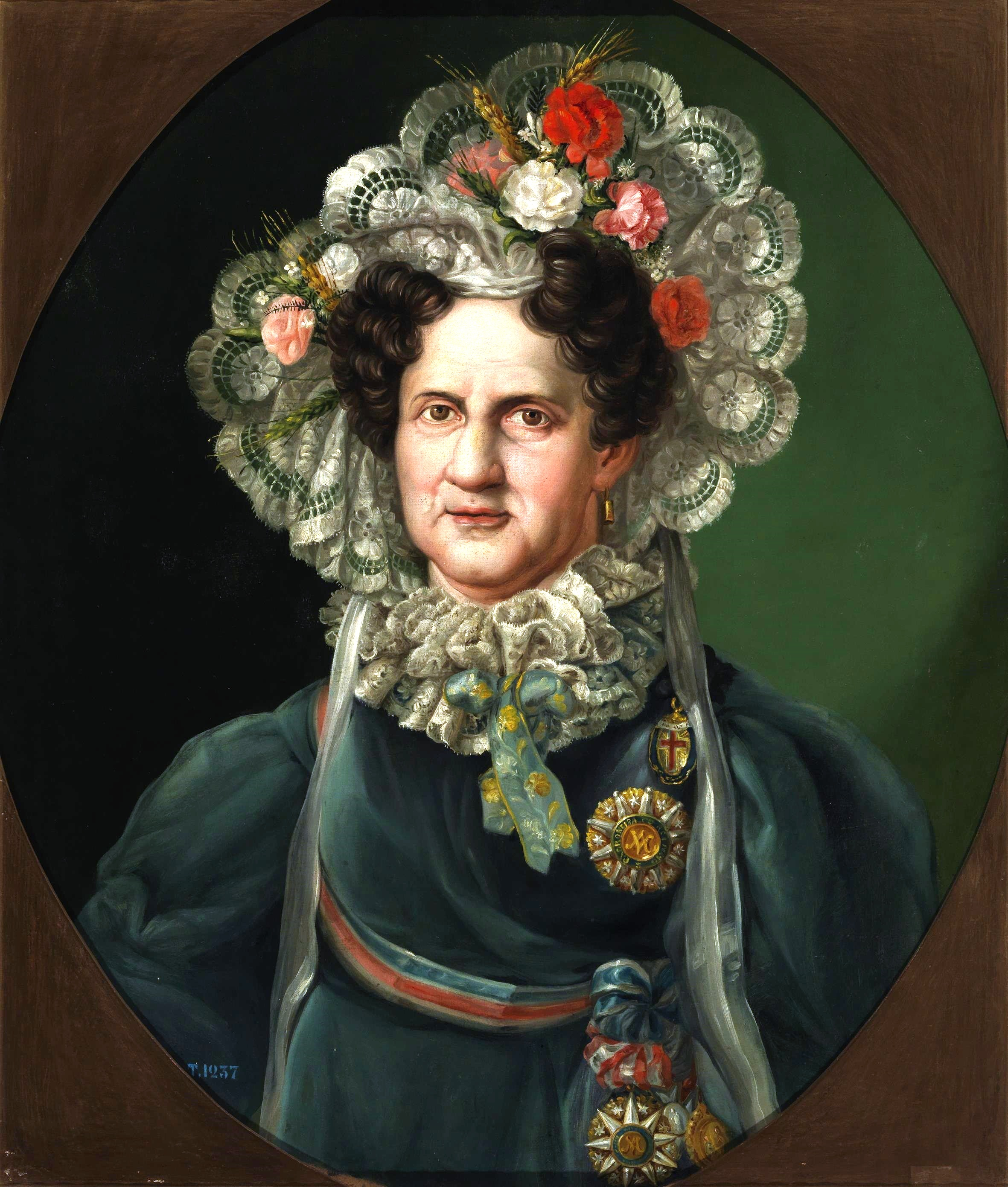
Portrait by Luis de la Cruz y Ríos, c. 1825

When the Portuguese royal family returned to Portugal in 1821 after an absence of 14 years, Carlota Joaquina met a country that had changed much since their departure. In 1807, Portugal had lived stably under absolutism. Napoleonic troops and political attitudes fostered by Spain's Cortes of Cádiz had brought revolutionary ideas to Portugal. In 1820, a liberal revolution commenced in Porto. A constitutional Cortes Gerais had been promulgated, and in 1821 it gave Portugal its first constitution, which the queen refused to swear. The queen had arch-conservative positions and wanted a reactionary response in Portugal. Her husband, however, did not want to renege on his vows to uphold the constitution. Carlota Joaquina made an alliance with her youngest son Miguel, who shared his mother's conservative views. In 1824, using Miguel's position as army commander, they took power and held the king a virtual prisoner in the palace, where the queen tried to make him abdicate in favor of Miguel. The king received British support against his wife and son and regained power, finally compelling his son to leave the country. The queen had also to go briefly into exile.

King John VI lived in Bemposta Palace and Queen Carlota Joaquina in Queluz. Though she lived there quietly, she became decidedly eccentric in dress and behaviour. However, their eldest son Pedro, left behind as regent in Brazil, was proclaimed and crowned on 1 December 1822 as its independent Emperor. John VI refused to accept this until he was persuaded by the British to do so, signing in August 1825 the Treaty of Rio de Janeiro by which he and Carlota Joaquina were granted the honorific title of Emperors of Brasil. He died in March 1826. Claiming ill-health, Carlota Joaquina refused to visit his deathbed and started the rumour that her husband had been poisoned (which was later proven to be true) by the Freemasons.

==== Death ====
During the reign of King Miguel, who ascended to the throne in 1828, Carlota would not play a significant role in the governance of what many considered her favorite son. Furthermore, the prince did not summon his mother from exile when he assumed the throne, leaving her to die alone, forgotten, sad, and bitter. She died on 7 January 1830, aged 54, without having lived long enough to witness the collapse of her ambitions with D. Miguel's defeat in the civil war that broke out in 1832.

She was first buried in Sinitra, but in 1854, her remains were moved to the Royal Pantheon of the Braganza Dynasty, where she was laid to rest beside her estranged husband at the Monastery of São Vicente de Fora in Lisbon.

=== Personality ===
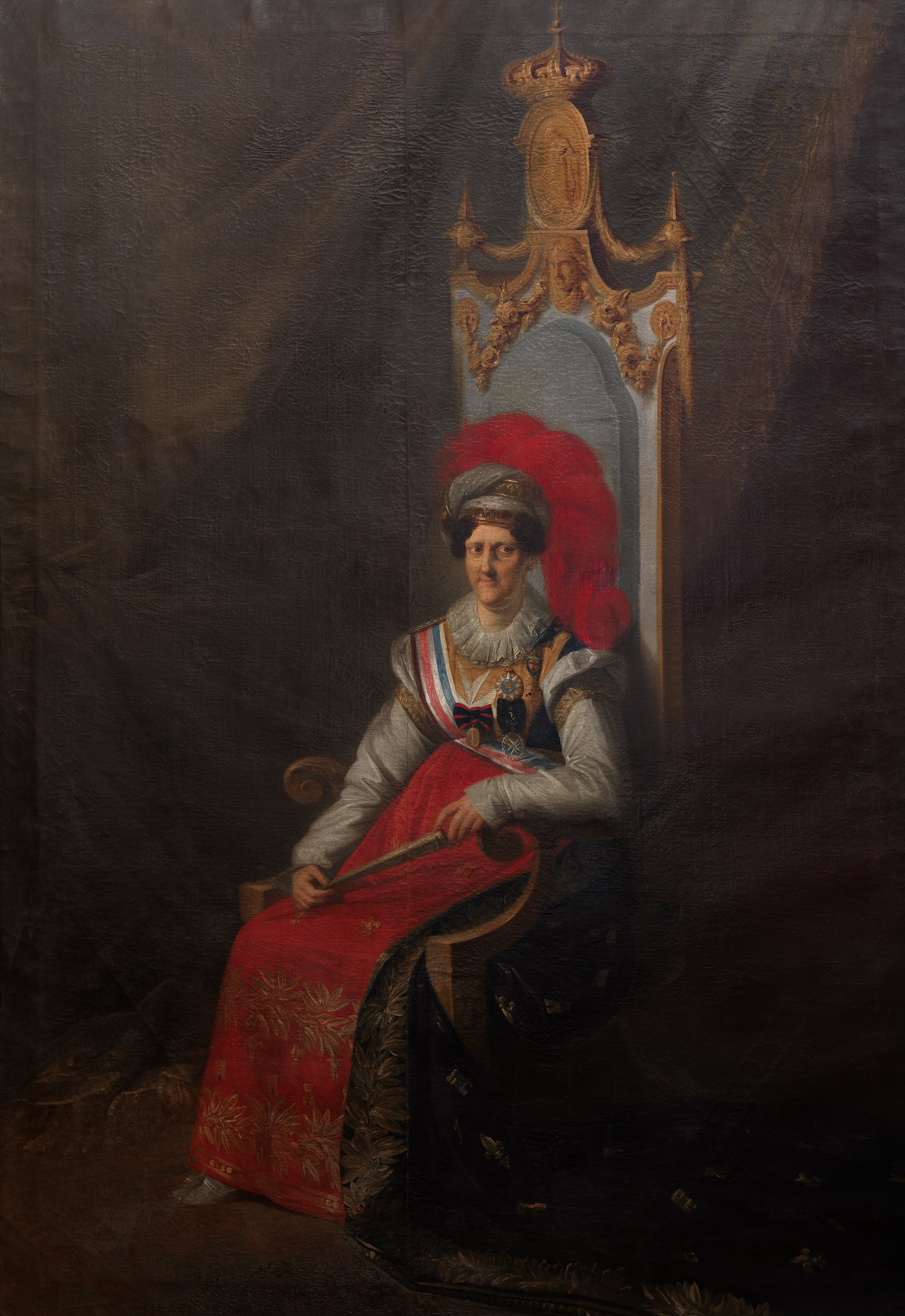
Portrait by João Baptista Ribeiro, 1824

Carlota Joaquina’s personality was significantly shaped by her frequent exclusion from political decision-making, which led her to create a faction around her with the goal of gaining control from the Prince Regent. She sought to imprison him and declare him incapable of managing state affairs, similar to the actions of her own mother. In an era when women had little formal power and were often relegated to weaving subtle intrigues, Carlota Joaquina stood out as a woman of exceptional political insight and extraordinary sharpness. She was also a devoted mother, especially attentive to the health of her children, and a dedicated daughter and wife, often affectionate, despite the many rumors that surrounded her.

Despite the gossip and false narratives about her character, Doña Carlota possessed many remarkable qualities. She was highly educated, an excellent mother who personally educated her children, and demonstrated exceptional talent in political affairs. Carlota dedicated many hours to studying, showing great interest not only in Portuguese matters but also in those concerning Spain. Her later involvement in Rio de Janeiro, where she worked to advance the interests of the Río de la Plata Viceroyalty and supported the Carlotism political movement, is evidence of her alignment with Spanish political interests.

The historian Octávio Tarquínio de Sousa, in História dos Fundadores do Império do Brasil (1957), suggests that "Doña Carlota Joaquina was not resigned to the political inactivity she was condemned to. Determined to act as a sovereign, she conceived a plan to secure a throne for herself in the Spanish provinces of the Americas, or at the very least, to govern as regent in the name of her brother, Ferdinand VII. With the assistance of British Vice-Admiral Sydney Smith and without opposition from her husband, agents were sent to Río de la Plata, where they formed a large faction. From that point on, the intrigues grew increasingly ruthless and complex."

=== Physical ===
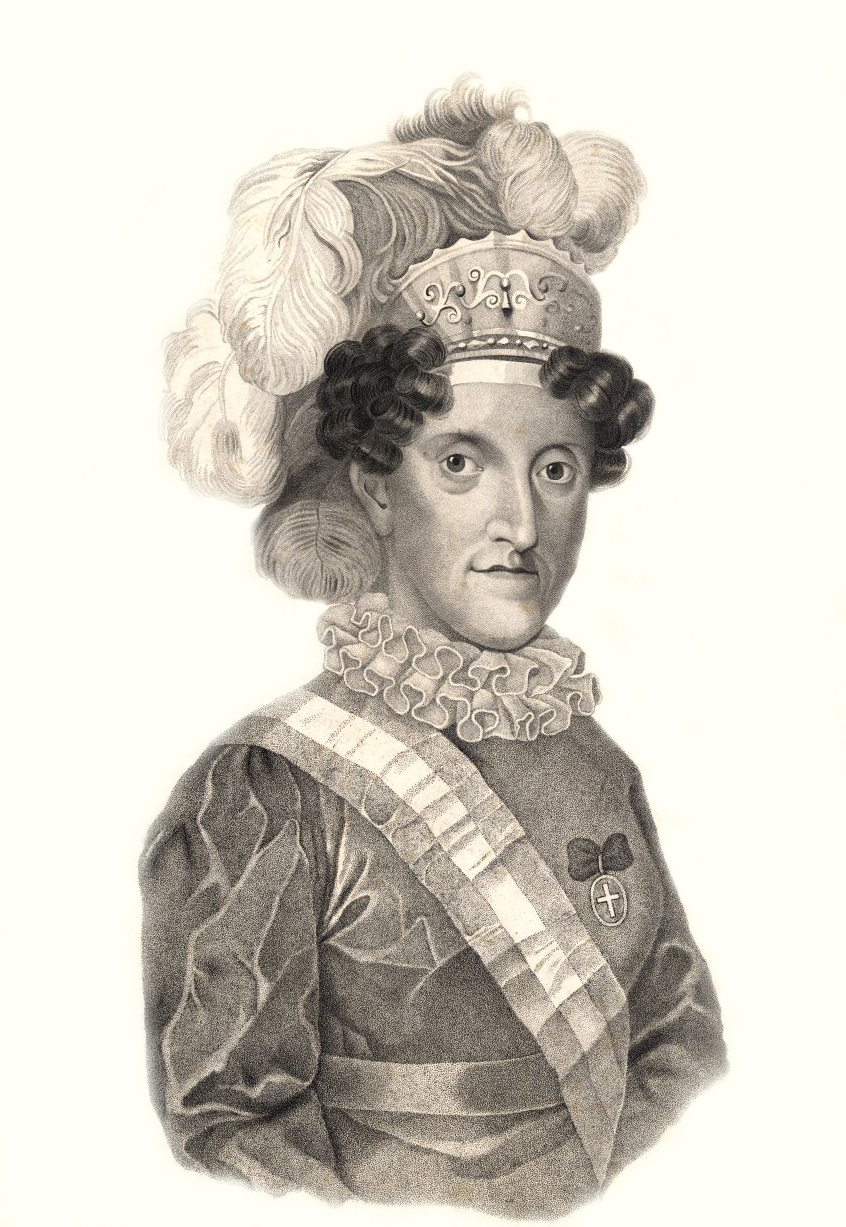
Drawing by Manuel António de Castro, 1827

According to the description by Albert Saviné, Doña Carlota lacked all the physical attributes typically associated with feminine beauty. She was short in stature, with a delicate and frail appearance that suggested poor health. Her head was disproportionate, and her features lacked refinement and grace:

The Princess of Brazil was barely five feet tall at her tallest point. She was lame, probably a result of a fall from her horse; her back was similarly crooked in the same direction. The princess's bust, like the rest of her body, was a mystery of nature, which had taken pleasure in deforming her. Her head, which could have remedied that deformity, was the most bizarrely monstrous head that could ever walk the earth. Her eyes were small and very close together. Her nose, as a consequence of her love of hunting and free, wandering life, was almost always swollen and red like that of a Swiss person. Her mouth, the most curious part of her repugnant figure, was adorned with many rows of black, green, white, and yellow teeth, placed obliquely like an instrument composed of several joints of different sizes. Her skin was rough and tanned, and there were many pimples on it, almost always suppurating, giving her figure a repugnant aspect. Set at the ends of her arms, her hands were deformed and dark." Her black hair was bristly, impossible to tame with a brush, comb or cream, it looked like a mane.

Archduchess Leopoldina of Austria, one of her daughters-in-law, who married Don Pedro I, Emperor of Brazil, reportedly found Doña Carlota so unattractive upon first meeting her that she "lowered her eyes, as if not wanting to look at her again; the marks of smallpox, the hairstyle, the strings and strings of pearls and precious stones tangled in her hair, hanging from her greasy curls like snakes."

== Historiography ==
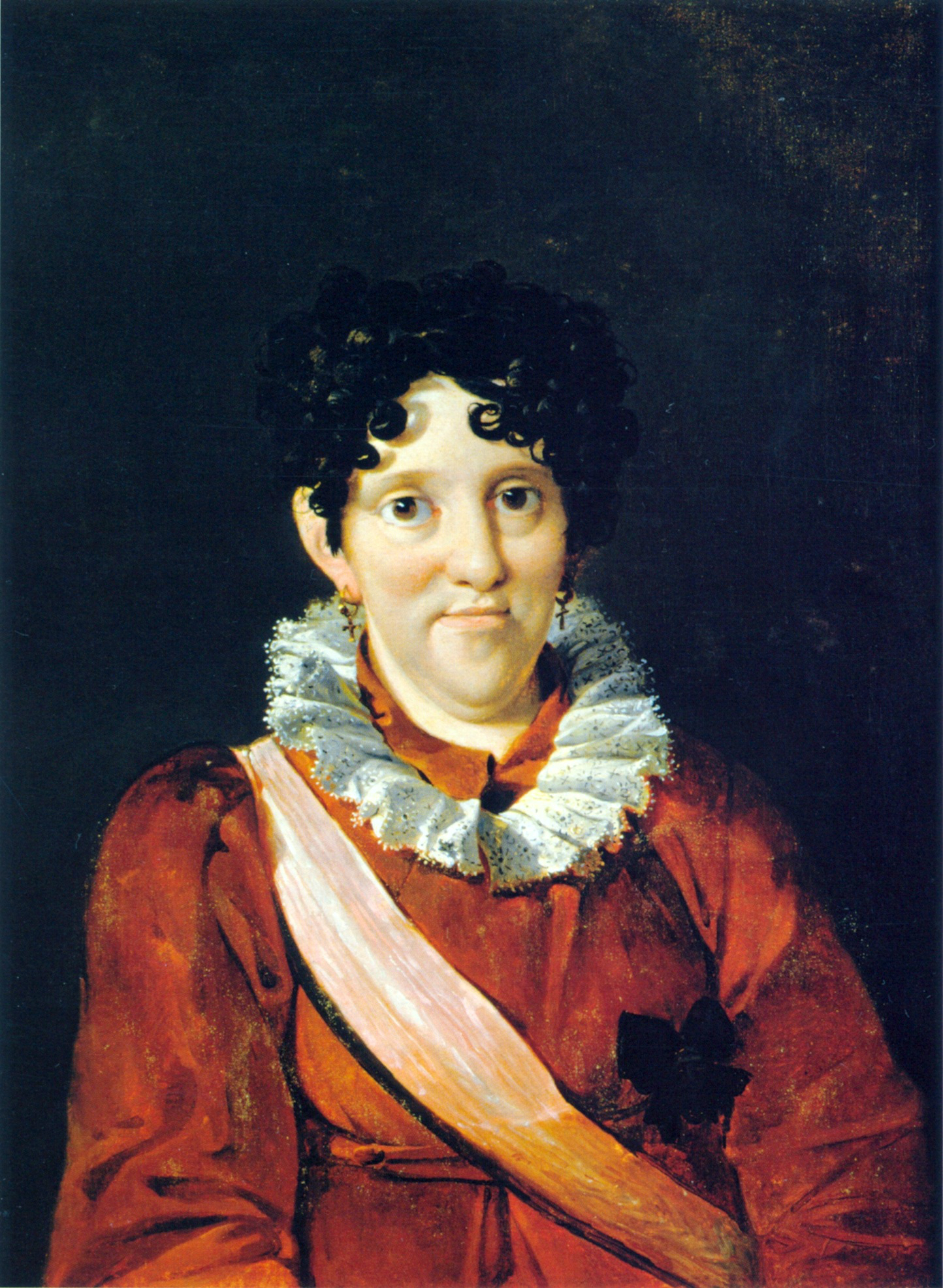
Portrait by Nicolas-Antoine Taunay, 1817

Contemporary historiography still faces challenges in delineating the historical profile of the wife of King Don John VI, whose figure is shrouded in anecdotal legends and rumors, widely spread in popular imagination. Similar to her mother, the intriguing Queen Maria Luisa of Spain, and other queens of the period in which Carlota Joaquina was situated, during a time of declining prestige for traditional absolutist monarchies, the Portuguese queen endured a series of defamations that were used as a political weapon.

Her figure has been associated with that of a perverse and promiscuous woman who incessantly conspired against her husband, the prince regent. The mere mention of her name evokes images of a procession of dissolute caprices and political intrigues. Manuel de Oliveira Lima describes her as one of the greatest, if not the greatest, impediments in the life of Don John, while the Rio de Janeiro chronicler Luiz Edmundo emphasizes that, "at the Lisbon court, the wife of Don John was likened to a cat perpetually in heat, seeking her lovers, for whom anything would suffice, provided it bore an approximate resemblance to a man."

Recently, historians have argued that her Spanish nationality and her political involvement at a time when such activity was not the customary role of a woman, as well as the fact that the wife of Don John held little affection for either the Portuguese court or the later Brazilian one, may explain the resentment and disdain with which history has treated her character. The biographies Carlota Joaquina, queen of Portugal (1949), by Marcus Cheke, and Carlota Joaquina, a rainha devassa (1968), by João Felício dos Santos, as well as the satirical film Carlota Joaquina, Princess of Brazil (1995), directed by Carla Camurati, have further reinforced this negative image of Carlota Joaquina.

The historian Francisca Nogueira de Azevedo, author of Carlota Joaquina na Corte do Brasil, states that "the liberal movement and the social and political transformations of the nineteenth century required reinventions of the past in order to legitimize a present that was intended to be constructed. Carlota Joaquina, a Portuguese queen who never lost her Spanish identity, opposed the transfer of the royal family to Brazil and expressed her delight at the return to Portugal; she defended absolutism and refused to sign the Portuguese Liberal Constitution, and therefore was certainly unsuited to be elevated to the rank of figures considered worthy of national memory." The Argentine writer Marsilio Cassotti argued that there was a secret effort by the Portuguese and British governments to discredit the queen, who consistently defended Spanish colonial interests.

== Issue ==
Carlota Joaquina married King John VI of Portugal in 1785 and had nine children.

Name	Image	Birth	Death	Notes
Infanta Maria Teresa		29 April 1793	17 January 1874	Married first her cousin Pedro Carlos de Borbón y Bragança, Infante of Spain and Portugal, and second to Carlos, Infante of Spain, widower of her sister Maria Francisca
Francisco António, Prince of Beira		21 March 1795	11 June 1801	Died at the age of 6, making his younger brother, Pedro, the heir to the throne of Portugal
Infanta Maria Isabel		19 May 1797	26 December 1818	Married Ferdinand VII, King of Spain
Peter IV of Portugal, I of Brazil		12 October 1798	24 September 1834	Stayed in Brazil after Napoleonic Wars in Spain. Proclaimed the Independence of Brazil in 1822 and became its first monarch as Emperor Peter I. He was also King of Portugal as Peter IV in 1826.
Infanta Maria Francisca		22 April 1800	4 September 1834	Married Carlos, Infante of Spain (his first marriage)
Infanta Isabel Maria		4 July 1801	22 April 1876	served as regent of Portugal from 1826 to 1828; died unmarried
Miguel of Braganza		26 October 1802	14 November 1866	Known by the Liberals as the Usurper, he was King of Portugal between 1828 and 1834. He was forced to abdicate after the Liberal Wars.
Infanta Maria da Assunção		25 June 1805	7 January 1834	died unmarried
Infanta Ana de Jesus Maria, Marquesa de Loulé		23 October 1806	22 June 1857	Married Nuno José Severo de Mendoça Rolim de Moura Barreto, Marquis and then Duke of Loulé, and had issue

== In popular culture ==
After her death, Carlota Joaquina, mainly in Brazil, became part of popular culture and an important historical figure, being the subject of several books, films and other media.

Cinema

- Independência ou Morte (1972) – portrayed by Heloísa Helena.
- Carlota Joaquina, Princess of Brazil (1995) – portrayed by Ludmila Dayer (young) and Marieta Severo (adult).

Television

- Marquesa de Santos (1984) – portrayed by Bibi Ferreira.
- O Quinto dos Infernos (2002) – portrayed by Raíssa Medeiros and Betty Lago.
- Liberdade, Liberdade (2016) – portrayed by Susana Ribeiro.
- Novo Mundo (2017) – portrayed by Débora Olivieri.
- Era Uma Vez Uma História (2017) – portrayed by Cristina Lago.

== Ancestors ==
Ancestors of Carlota Joaquina of Spain

8. Philip V of Spain
4. Charles III of Spain
9. Elisabeth Farnese
2. Charles IV of Spain
10. Augustus III of Poland
5. Maria Amalia of Saxony
11. Maria Josepha of Austria
1. Carlota Joaquina of Spain
12. Philip V of Spain (= 8)
6. Philip, Duke of Parma
13. Elisabeth Farnese (= 9)
3. Maria Luisa of Parma
14. Louis XV
7. Louise Elisabeth of France
15. Marie Leszczyńska

== Bibliography ==
- Bueno, Eduardo (2003). Brasil: Uma história (in Portuguese). São Paulo: Ática.
- Cheke, Marcus (1949) [First published in English in 1947]. Carlota Joaquina, a Rainha Intrigante (in Portuguese). Translated by Gulnara Lobato de Morais Pereira. Rio de Janeiro: José Olympio.
- Cibelina, Marta (2021). A los Borbones y el sexo: De Felipe V a Felipe VI (in Spanish) (3rd ed.). La Esfera de los Libros. ISBN 978-8413842028.
- de Azevedo, Francisca Nogueira (2007). Carlota Joaquina: Cartas inéditas' (in Portuguese). Rio de Janeiro: Casa da Palavra.
- Edmundo, Luiz (1957) [1939]. A Côrte de D. João no Rio de Janeiro (in Portuguese). Vol. 1: 1808-1821 (2nd ed.). Conquista.
- Giedroyc, Romauld (1875). Résumé de l'histoire du Portugal au XIXe siècle, par le prince Romuald Giedroyc (in French). Paris: Librairie D'Amyot.
- Lima, Manuel de Oliveira (1908). Dom João VI no Brazil, 1808-1821 (in Portuguese). Rio de Janeiro: Typ. do Jornal do Commercio.
- Longo, James McMurtry (2008). Isabel Orleans-Braganca: The Brazilian princess who freed the slaves (1st paperback ed.). McFarland. ISBN 978-0786432011.
- Lousada, Maria Alexandre; Ferreira, Maria de Fátima Sá e Melo (2006). D. Miguel (in Portuguese). Lisboa: Círculo de Leitores.
- Lustosa, Isabel (2006). D. Pedro I: um herói sem nenhum caráter (in Portuguese). São Paulo: Companhia das Letras.
- Macaulay, Neill (1993). Dom Pedro I: a luta pela liberdade no Brasil e em Portugal, 1798-1834 [Dom Pedro I: the struggle for liberty in Brazil and Portugal, 1798-1834] (in Portuguese). Rio de Janeiro: Record. ISBN 8501038652.
- Newitt, Malyn (2019). The Braganzas The Rise and Fall of the Ruling Dynasties of Portugal and Brazil, 1640–1910. Reaktion Books. ISBN 978-1789141658.
- Pedreira e Costa, Jorge (2008). D. João VI (in Portuguese). Companhia das Letras. ISBN 978-8535911893.
- Pereira, Sara Marques (1999). D. Carlota Joaquina and the “Mirrors of Clio”: Political Action and Historiographical Representations (in Portuguese). Lisbon: Livros Horizonte. ISBN 978-9722410731.
- Rubio, Julián María (1920). La infanta Carlota Joaquina y la política de España en América (1808-1812) (in Spanish). Madrid: Imprenta de Estanislao Maestre.
- Rubio, Maria Jose (2012). Reinas de España (in Spanish). La Esfera de los Libros. ISBN 978-8499701301.
- Saviné, Albert (1912). Le Portugal il y a cent ans (in French). Paris: Société des éditions Louis-Michaud.

Carlota Joaquina of Spain House of Bourbon Cadet branch of the Capetian dynasty Born: 25 April 1775 Died: 7 January 1830
Portuguese royalty
Vacant Title last held by Mariana Victoria of Spain	Queen consort of Portugal; 1816–1826	Succeeded by Maria Leopoldina of Austria
