= António Luís de Meneses, 1st Marquis of Marialva =

Portuguese general and noble

António Luís de Meneses
- Marquis of Marialva, Count of Cantanhede
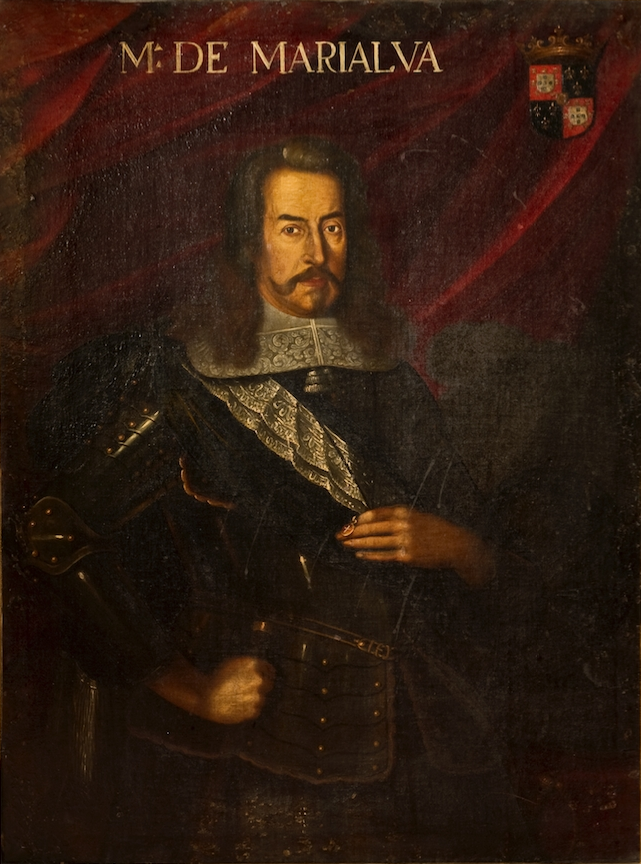
- Full name: António Luís de Meneses
- Born: 13 December 1596
- Died: 16 August 1675 (aged 78); Cantanhede
- Noble family: Meneses
- Issue: Pedro António de Menezes, 2nd Marquess of Marialva
- Father: Pedro de Menezes, 2nd Count of Cantanhede
- Mother: Constança de Gusmão
- Military career
- Branch: Portuguese Army
- Conflicts: Portuguese Restoration War; • Battle of the Lines of Elvas; • Battle of Montes Claros

António Luís de Meneses, 1st Marquis of Marialva and 3rd Count of Cantanhede (13 December 1596 – 16 August 1675) was a member of the Forty Conspirators and a capable Portuguese general who fought in the Portuguese Restoration War, that ended the Iberian Union between Portugal and Spain.

== Biography ==
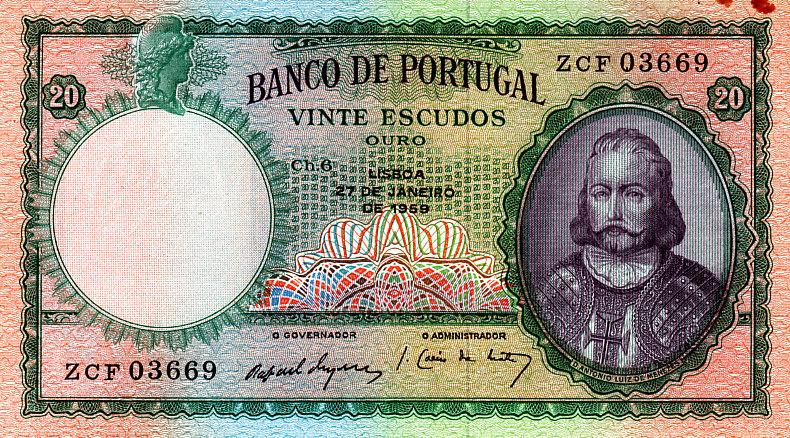
Meneses depicted on a 20 Escudo banknote.

Meneses was born in a noble family - his father was Dom Pedro de Menezes, 2nd count of Cantanhede, and his mother Dona Constança de Gusmão (daughter of Rui Gonçalves da Câmara, 1st count of Vila Franca).

Meneses was one of the Forty Conspirators involved in the revolution against the Spanish Habsburgs on 1 December 1640. He took active part in the storming of the residence and the capture of the Duchess of Mantua, who governed Portugal in the name of Philip IV of Spain (Philip III of Portugal).
In 1641 he was assigned as general-commander (mestre-de-campo) of the Portuguese forces loyal to John IV of Portugal, and he organized the defences against Spanish attacks. He participated in almost every battle of the Portuguese Restoration War between 1641 and 1665.
His greatest victories were the Battle of the Lines of Elvas in 1659 and the Battle of Montes Claros in 1665. After the success in the first battle the Count of Cantanhede received among several honors, the title of Marquis of Marialva on 11 June 1661. He was present at the signing of the Treaty of Lisbon on 13 February 1668.

After his victory at Montes Claros, he also worked to establish the Convent of São Pedro de Alcântara.

Portuguese nobility
| Preceded by Pedro de Menezes | Count of Cantanhede ? –1675 | Succeeded by Pedro António de Menezes |
| Preceded by New title | Marquis of Marialva; 1661–1675 | Succeeded by Pedro António de Menezes |
