= Neapolitan Republic (1647–1648) =

French protectorate within Most Serene Republic of Kingdom of Naples (1647-48)

Most Serene Republican Monarchy of Naples Serenissima Monarchia repubblicana di Napoli (Italian)
- 1647–1648
- Coat of arms
- Motto: S.P.Q.N. S.P.Q.N. "The Senate and People of Naples"
- Status: Protectorate of France
- Capital: Naples
- Common languages: Neapolitan; Italian; Sicilian
- Religion: Roman Catholicism
- Demonym: Neapolitan
- Government: Mixed (crowned republic)
- Doge
  - 1647–1648: Henry II of Guise
- Generalissimo
  - 1647–1648: Gennaro Annese
- Historical era: Renaissance/Early Modern
  - Masaniello's rebellion: July 7, 1647
  - Gennaro Annese proclaimed the Republic: October 22, 1647
  - Henry II of Guise made Doge: November 15, 1647
  - Rebellion repressed: April 5, 1648
- Currency: Tarì; Ducat; Piastra; Cavallo
Preceded by	Succeeded by
Kingdom of Naples	Kingdom of Naples
- Today part of: Italy

The Neapolitan Republic (Repubblica Napoletana) was established within the territory of the Kingdom of Naples and lasted from approximately October 22, 1647 until April 5, 1648. It emerged during the later stages of a major revolt against Spanish rule that had begun in July 1647, initially led by figures such as Masaniello and Giulio Genoino against the administration of King Philip IV of Spain and his viceroy, the Duke of Arcos.

After the Republic's proclamation, Henri II of Lorraine, 5th Duke of Guise, arrived in November 1647 and became its most prominent leader, eventually styled as Doge (borrowed from the Venetian Republic). He partly based his claim to leadership on his descent from the former King of Naples, René I of Anjou.

Reflecting its complex political identity, the Republic was known by several names, including Reale Repubblica ("Royal Republic") and Serenissima Repubblica di questo regno di Napoli ("Most Serene Republic of this Kingdom of Naples"). The title "Serenissima" was likely adopted in conscious comparison to the Republic of Venice. The Republic's coat of arms featured a red shield displaying the motto S.P.Q.N. (Latin: Senatus Populusque Neapolitanus, "The Senate and People of Naples"), in imitation of the Roman motto S.P.Q.R. (Senatus Populusque Romanus). During the Duke of Guise's leadership, his personal coat of arms was sometimes displayed in conjunction with the Republic's shield.

== History ==
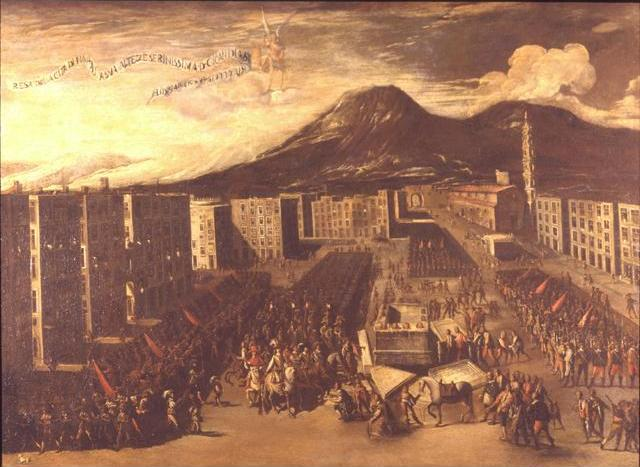
Naples surrenders to John of Austria. Painting by Carlo Coppola. Museo di San Martino.

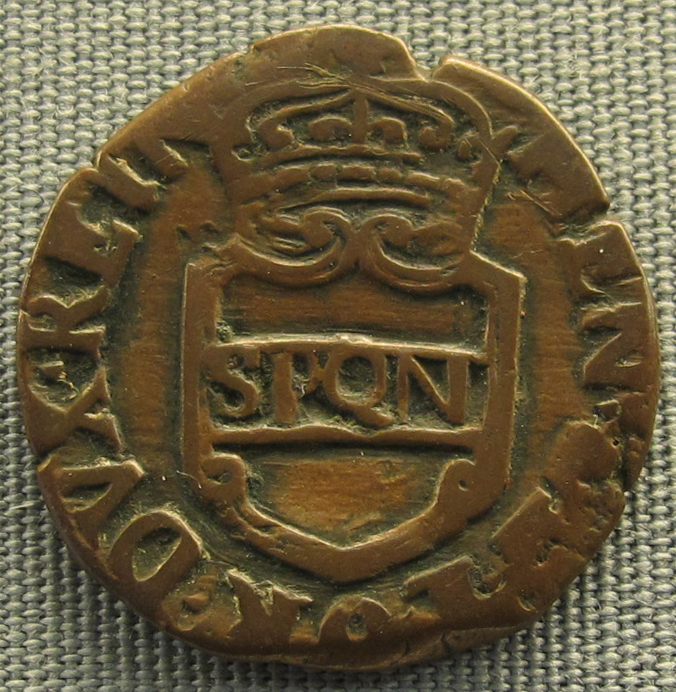
Coin bearing coat of arms.

Since 1504, the Kingdom of Naples had been ruled by the Spanish monarchy, initially through the Crown of Aragon, via appointed viceroys. During the first half of the 17th century Naples experienced a severe economic crisis, part of a broader downturn affecting much of Europe as a result of the Thirty Years' War. This crisis in Naples was exacerbated by a viceregal government largely indifferent to local welfare and primarily focused on financing the series of wars Spain was engaged in.

Although the forces of Viceroy Don Rodrigo Ponce de León, Duke of Arcos, had suppressed Masaniello's revolt in July 1647 and restored order in most of the city, strong discontent remained. When a fleet led by John of Austria the Younger, an illegitimate son of King Philip IV of Spain, arrived and bombarded the city in October 1647—ostensibly to "soothe the last insurgents"—a new revolt erupted. This phase of the uprising was no longer merely an uprising of the lazzari (Neapolitan commoners) against the ruling elite. Led by the gunsmith Gennaro Annese, it took on a distinctly anti-Spanish character, directed against the rule of Philip IV's.

The rebels expelled the viceroy's forces, and on October 22, 1647, Gennaro Annese proclaimed the Neapolitan Republic. The Republic's leaders sought French support and invited Henri II de Lorraine, Duke of Guise, to lead the new state. The Duke of Guise, who was in Rome at the time, accepted the offer, motivated by personal ambition, his family's historical claims to Naples, and the desire to restore French influence in southern Italy after an absence of roughly two centuries. On November 15, 1647, he arrived in Naples and assumed leadership of the Republic.

From its inception, the Neapolitan Republic faced formidable challenges. Spanish forces held the strategic castles overlooking the city, while loyalist cities and the nobility dominated the provinces from their base in Aversa, thereby controlling Naples' crucial supply lines. Although the Duke of Guise managed to capture Aversa in early 1648, this victory did little to improve the Republic's strategic position or secure its supply lines. Meanwhile, Philip IV's forces, commanded first by John of Austria and later the Count of Oñate, pursued a strategy that combined military containment with the use of spies and agents within Naples to exploit internal divisions and encourage defections among the rebels.

On April 5, 1648, the Duke of Guise, reportedly betrayed by counsellors in the pay of Philip IV, attempted a military sortie. The attempt failed, leading to Guise's capture and the swift collapse of the city's remaining defenses; Spanish forces re-entered Naples, effectively ending the Republic. Gennaro Annese, the former rebel leader, was subsequently arrested and executed on June 20, 1648, in Naples' Piazza del Mercato.

On June 4, 1648, a French fleet of approximately 40 ships appeared in an attempt to reignite the rebellion, but the exhausted Neapolitan populace did not rise against the restored Spanish control. An attempted French landing on the nearby island of Procida was repulsed by Spanish forces, forcing the fleet to withdraw. A second, larger French fleet, commanded by Thomas of Savoy, arrived in the Gulf of Naples on August 4, 1648. This expedition succeeded in capturing Procida. However, after Spanish naval forces repelled French actions near Ischia, Pozzuoli, and Salerno, the fleet abandoned hope of taking Naples and departed.

On June 3, 1649, further riots broke out in Naples, but they were quickly suppressed by the Spanish authorities, aided by the population's general weariness with conflict.

== See also ==
- Neapolitan Revolt of 1647
- History of Naples
- List of Neapolitan viceroys
