= Franco-Spanish War (1635–1659) =

Part of the Thirty Years' War

Franco–Spanish War
- Part of the French–Habsburg rivalry
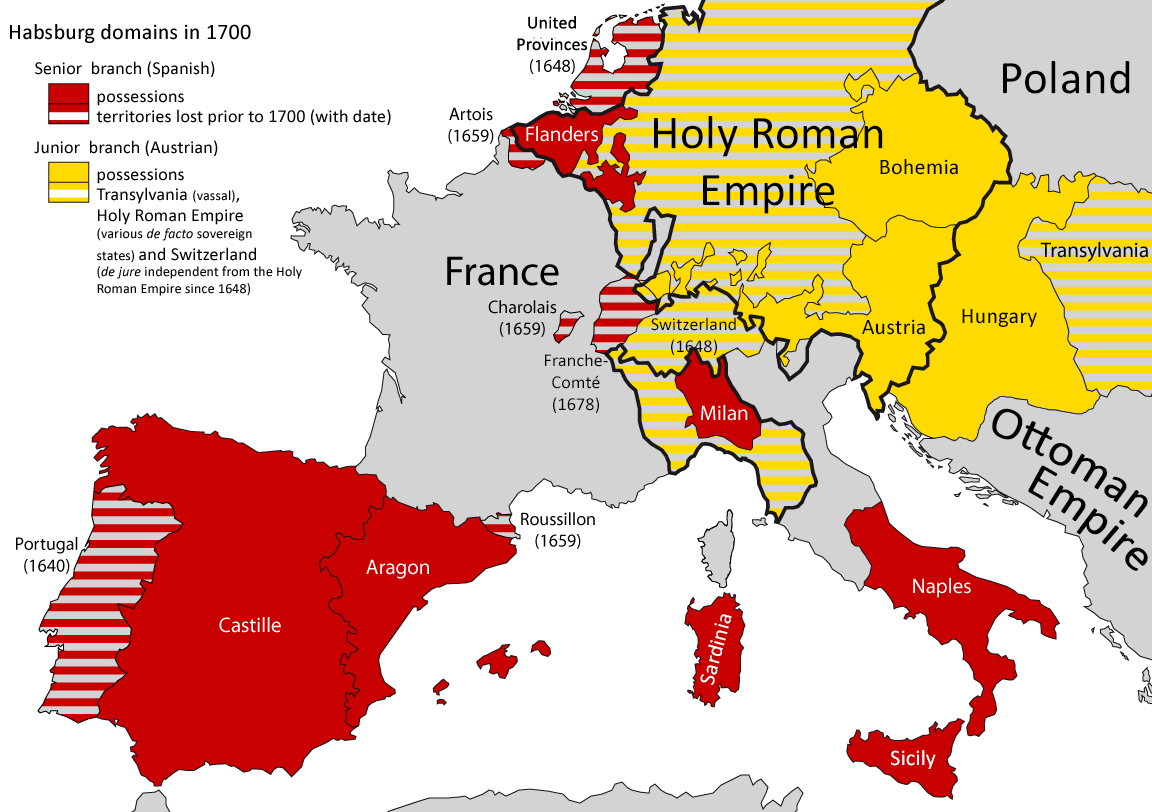
- The war was driven by long standing French attempts to strengthen their borders with Habsburg Spain (red) and Habsburg Austria (yellow)
| Date | 19 May 1635 – 7 November 1659 |
| Location | Northern France, Catalonia, Spanish Netherlands, Northern Italy, the Rhineland, Mediterranean Sea, Atlantic Ocean |
| Result | Treaty of the Pyrenees |
| Territorial changes | France annexes Artois in addition to other smaller territories from the Spanish Netherlands and Roussillon |

Belligerents
| Phase I: 1635–1648; France; Dutch Republic (Duchy of Savoy) Savoy; Mantua; Modena and Reggio (Note: 1647 to 1649); Parma; Phase II: 1648–1659; France (Duchy of Savoy) Savoy; Modena and Reggio (Note: 1655 to 1659) (Commonwealth of England) England (Note: 1657 to 1659) | Phase I: 1635–1648 (Spain) Spanish Empire; Holy Roman Empire; Parma; Modena and Reggio (Note: 1636 to 1646) Phase II: 1648–1659 (Spain) Spanish Empire |

Commanders and leaders
| (Kingdom of France) Louis XIII (Kingdom of France) Louis XIV (Kingdom of France) Cardinal Richelieu (Kingdom of France) Cardinal Mazarin (Kingdom of France) Turenne (Kingdom of France) Condé (Note: Until 1652) (Kingdom of France) Choiseul (Kingdom of France) Coligny (Kingdom of France) de la Porte (Kingdom of France) de Gassion (DOW) (Kingdom of France) La Ferté-Senneterre (Kingdom of France) Bernard of Saxe-Weimar (Dutch Republic) Frederick Henry (Commonwealth of England) Oliver Cromwell | (Spain) Philip IV (Spain) Olivares (Spain) de Haro (Spain) Cardinal-Infante Ferdinand (Spain) Francisco de Melo (Spain) John of Austria (Spain) Caracena (Spain) Condé (Note: From 1652) (Spain) Pedro de Vélez (Spanish Empire) (Holy Roman Empire) Archduke Leopold (Spanish Empire) (Holy Roman Empire) Piccolomini |

Strength
| France: c. 100,000–125,000 (Note: French troop levels fluctuated greatly, particularly in the 1640s, and estimates by historians vary accordingly, ranging from 218,000 to just 40,000 between 1645 and 1648. On average, it is likely no more than 100,000 were in the field at any given time.) | Spain: 200,000 (1640) |

Casualties and losses
| France: c. 200,000 to 300,000+ killed or wounded in combat | Spain: Unknown |

The Franco-Spanish War, (Note: French: Guerre franco-espagnole Spanish: Guerra franco-española) from May 1635 to November 1659, was fought between France and Spain, each supported by various allies at different points. It consists of two distinct phases, the first from May 1635 to October 1648, which is considered a related conflict of the Thirty Years' War, the second continued until the Treaty of the Pyrenees in 1659.

Major areas of conflict included northern Italy, the Spanish Netherlands and the Rhineland. France supported revolts against Spanish rule in Portugal (1640–1668), Catalonia (1640–1653) and Naples (1647), while Spain backed French rebels in the 1647 to 1653 "Fronde". Both also backed opposing sides in the 1639 to 1642 Piedmontese Civil War.

In the first phase of the Thirty Years' War, France provided support for both the Dutch Republic and Sweden against Spain and Austria, but prior to May 1635 had avoided direct participation. At this point, France declared war on Spain, then shortly afterwards separately entered the 30 Years War against Austria. After the latter ended in 1648, fighting continued between Spain and France, with neither able to achieve decisive victory. France made some gains in Flanders and the Pyrenees, but by 1658 both sides were financially exhausted and made peace in November 1659.

While French territorial gains were relatively modest, they strengthened the kingdom's frontiers, while the marriage of Louis XIV to Maria Theresa of Spain enhanced Bourbon dynastic claims. Traditionally, the Treaty of the Pyrenees has been viewed as marking the end of Spain's position as the predominant European power. More recent assessments have been more cautious, noting that the conflict itself remained militarily indecisive and that the Spanish Empire retained its vast overseas territories, thus remaining a major power, while some historians argue that Spain escaped with comparatively light terms.

== Strategic overview ==
From 1618 to 1648, Europe was dominated by the Thirty Years' War, another outlet in the long-running contest between France, and its Habsburg rivals in Spain and the Holy Roman Empire. In its first stages, France avoided direct involvement, instead financing Habsburg opponents such as the Dutch Republic, and backing Swedish intervention in the Thirty Years' War. When fighting seemed likely to end in May 1635, France declared war on Spain and Emperor Ferdinand. From 1640 onwards, it also supported insurgencies in Catalonia, Portugal, and Naples.

For their part, the Habsburgs backed a series of Huguenot rebellions and conspiracies by feudal lords who resented their loss of power under Cardinal Richelieu and his successor, Cardinal Mazarin. They included those led by Montmorency in 1632, the Princes des Paix plot by Louis, Count of Soissons in 1641, and Cinq-Mars in 1642. Spain also backed anti-government rebels in the 1648–1653 French civil war known as the Fronde.

Wider co-operation between the Spanish and Austrian Habsburgs was limited since their objectives did not always align. Spain was a global maritime power, while Austria was primarily focused on the Holy Roman Empire. Although the Habsburgs had been Holy Roman Emperors since 1440, their control over the empire was weakened by the 1555 Peace of Augsburg, which continued in the period leading up to 1620. Reversing the trend was a major Habsburg objective during the Thirty Years' War, but failure was acknowledged by the 1648 Peace of Westphalia.

France faced the same issue of diverging objectives with its allies. The war coincided with the period of economic supremacy known as the Dutch Golden Age, and by 1640, many Dutch statesmen viewed French ambitions in the Spanish Netherlands as a threat. Unlike France, Swedish war aims were restricted to Germany, and in 1641, the Swedes considered a separate peace with Ferdinand II's son, Ferdinand III.

The Spanish Road; Purple: Spanish dependencies; Green: Ruled by Austria; Orange: Ruled by Spain

From the beginning of the Dutch Revolt in 1569, Italy, especially the Kingdom of Naples, was the primary source of recruits and money for the Army of Flanders. As a result, much of the fighting focused on the Spanish Road, a land supply route connecting Spanish possessions in Italy with Flanders but also passing through areas considered vital to French security, like Alsace. The independent Duchy of Savoy and Spanish-held Duchy of Milan were strategically important to the Road but also provided access to the vulnerable southern borders of France and Habsburg territories in Austria. Richelieu aimed to end Spanish dominance in those areas, an objective largely achieved at his death in 1642.

Until the advent of railways in the 19th century, water was the primary means of bulk transportation, and campaigns focused on control of rivers and ports. Armies relied on foraging, while the feeding of the draught animals essential for transport and cavalry restricted campaigning in the winter. By the 1630s, the countryside had been devastated by years of constant warfare, which limited the size of the armies and their ability to conduct operations. Sickness killed far more soldiers than combat. The French army that invaded Flanders in May 1635 had been reduced by desertion and disease from 27,000 to under 17,000 by early July.

== Background ==
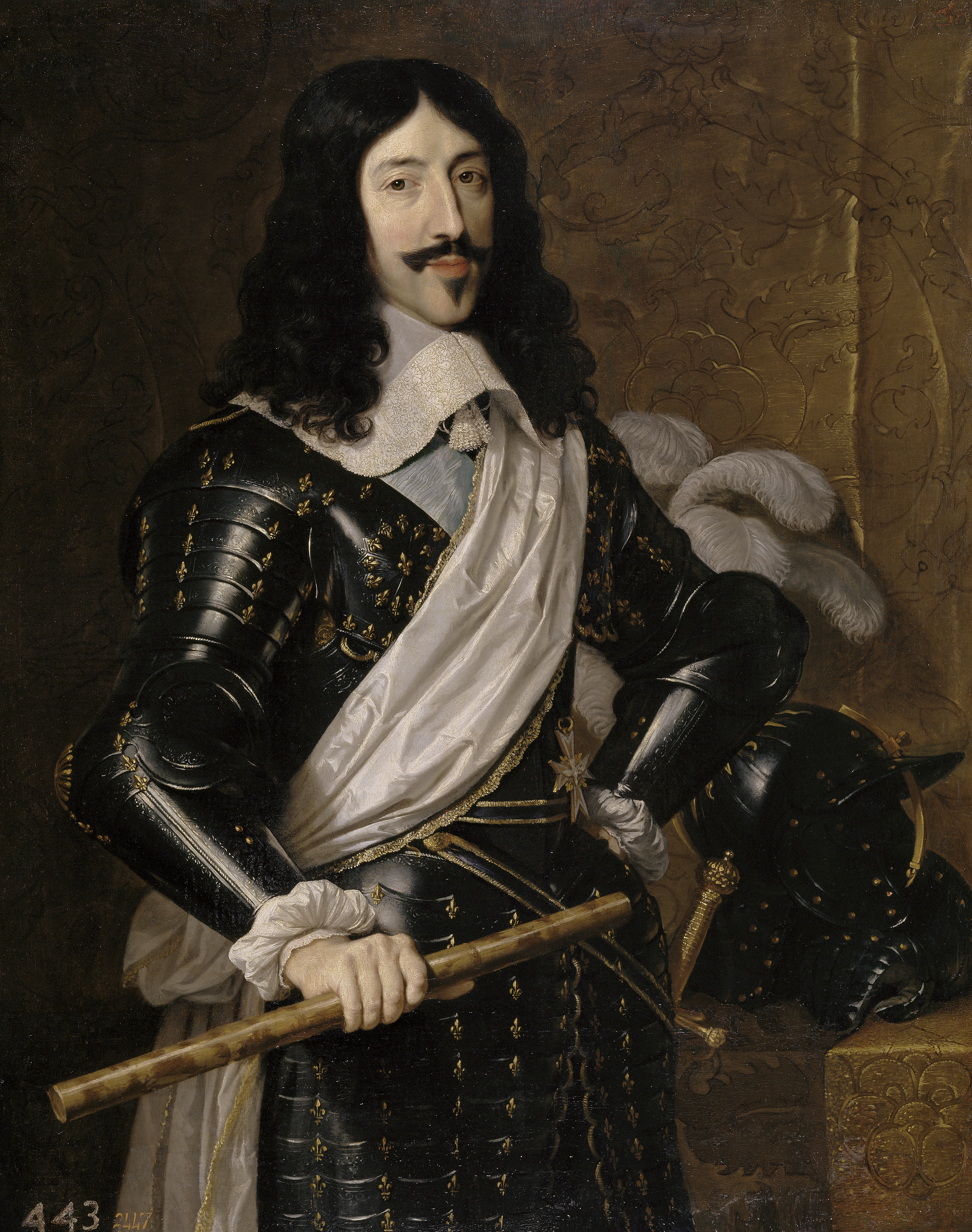
Louis XIII, King of France from 1610 to 1643

The Thirty Years' War began in 1618 when the Protestant-dominated Bohemian Estates offered the Crown of Bohemia to Frederick V of the Palatinate, in place of the Catholic Ferdinand II. Most of the Holy Roman Empire remained neutral, and the Bohemian Revolt was quickly suppressed. However, the war expanded when Spanish forces invaded the Palatinate and forced Frederick into exile. The removal of a hereditary prince changed the nature and extent of the war.

As part of a general policy aimed at limiting Habsburg expansion wherever possible, Catholic France supported their largely Protestant opponents. This included backing the Dutch Republic in the Eighty Years' War, as well as funding first Danish, then Swedish intervention in the Thirty Years' War. In 1630, Gustavus Adolphus of Sweden invaded Pomerania, partly to support his Protestant coreligionists, but also to control the Baltic trade, whose tolls provided much of Sweden's income.

Although Swedish intervention continued after Gustavus' death at Lützen in 1632, it caused tensions with Saxony and Brandenburg-Prussia, whose lands were devastated by the plague and famine that accompanied the war. Imperial-Spanish victory at Nördlingen in September 1634 forced the Swedes to abandon southern Germany, and most of their German allies made peace with Ferdinand II at Prague in April 1635.

Rumours of a proposed Austro-Spanish offensive in the Netherlands led Louis XIII of France and Richelieu to decide on direct intervention. In early 1635, Bernard of Saxe-Weimar agreed to provide 16,000 troops for a campaign in Alsace and the Rhineland, while Louis XIII simultaneously signed an anti-Spanish alliance with the Dutch, and the Treaty of Compiègne with Sweden.

== Phase I: 1635 to 1648 Treaty of Westphalia ==
1635–1659; key locations in northern France and the Spanish Netherlands (current Belgium borders shown; Arras, Valenciennes and Dunkirk were part of the Spanish Netherlands)

In May, a French army of 27,000 defeated the Spanish at Les Avins, and besieged Leuven on 24 June, where they were joined by Dutch troops. The siege made little progress, and on 4 July the French withdrew across the border having suffered severe losses from disease. Led by Cardinal-Infante Ferdinand of Austria, the Spanish captured Limbourg and Gennep, then besieged Dutch garrisons in the Duchy of Cleves, including Schenkenschanz. The latter was taken by the Spanish on 28 July, and recovered only after a long and costly siege.

The States General of the Netherlands now opposed further large-scale land operations in favour of attacks on Spanish trade. In 1636, Philip switched his focus to recovering territories in the Low Countries, while a Franco-Savoyard offensive in Lombardy was defeated at Tornavento in June. A Spanish incursion into northern France reached as far as Corbie in August, but despite causing panic in Paris, the Cardinal-Infante retreated due to supply problems, and the attempt was not repeated.

As agreed in 1635, the French replaced Swedish garrisons in Alsace with mercenaries supplied by Bernard of Saxe-Weimar. Before his death in 1639, the latter won a series of victories in the Rhineland, notably the capture of Breisach in December 1638. The loss of Alsace meant Spanish troops in Flanders had to be resupplied by sea rather than land, making them vulnerable to the Dutch States Navy, which destroyed a large Spanish supply fleet at the Battle of the Downs in 1639. Although most convoys got through, its loss illustrates the difficulties Spain faced in sustaining its war effort in the Low Countries.

With Spain focused on Europe, the Dutch attacked their colonial possessions, especially those belonging to the Portuguese Empire. Then ruled by Philip IV, his inability to protect these interests caused increasing unrest in Portugal. Damage to the economy and tax increases imposed to pay for the war led to protests throughout Spanish territories, which in 1640 erupted into open revolts in Portugal and Catalonia. In 1641, the Catalan Courts recognised Louis XIII as Count of Barcelona and ruler of the Principality of Catalonia. However, the war turned into a contest between the Franco-Catalan and Spanish elites, with the bulk of then population opposed to both.

1635–1648; key locations Rhineland campaign

Louis XIII died on 14 May 1643, and was succeeded by his five-year-old son, Louis XIV, whose mother, Anne of Austria, took control of the Regency Council that ruled in his name. Five days later, Louis II de Bourbon, Prince of Condé defeated the Spanish Army of Flanders at Rocroi. Victory gave Condé, a Prince du sang and effective ruler of much of eastern France, leverage in his struggle with Queen Anne and Cardinal Mazarin.

Despite a series of defeats in Flanders, including Lens in August 1648, Spain remained in the war, while French successes in Germany at Nördlingen and Zusmarshausen were offset by losses at Tuttlingen and Herbsthausen. In Italy, French-backed Savoyard offensives against Milan achieved little because of lack of resources and the disruption caused by the 1639 to 1642 Piedmontese Civil War. Victory at Orbetello in June 1646, and the recapture of Naples in 1647 left Spain firmly in control of the Italian Peninsula.

The 1648 Peace of Westphalia ended the Thirty Years' War, recognised Dutch independence and ended the drain on Spanish resources. Under the October 1648 Treaty of Münster, France gained strategic locations in Alsace and Lorraine, as well as Pinerolo, which controlled access to Alpine passes in Northern Italy. However, the peace excluded Italy, Imperial territories in the Low Countries and French-occupied Lorraine. This meant that although Emperor Ferdinand and France were formally at peace, it allowed fighting between France and Spain to continue.

== Phase II: 1648 to 1659 ==
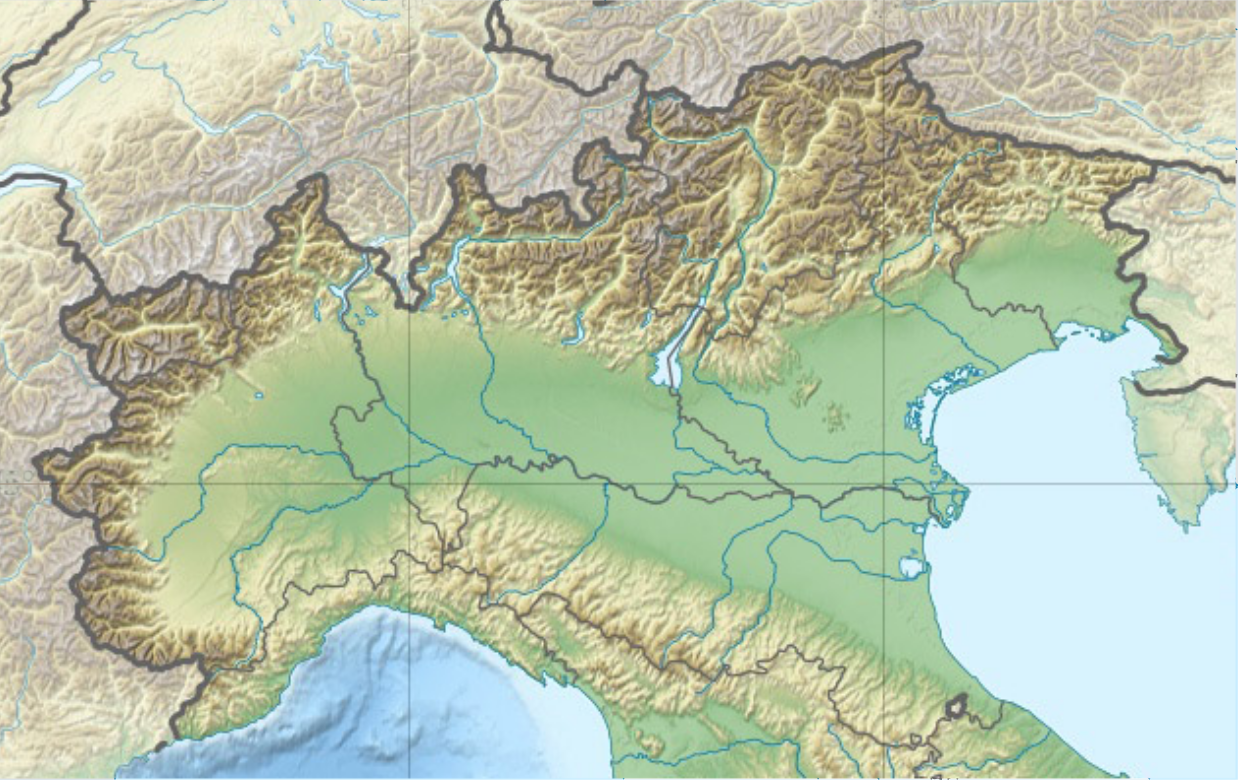
Northern Italy; key locations 1635–1659 (note Pinerolo, ceded to France in 1648)

Philip IV of Spain was forced to declare bankruptcy in 1647, and thereafter focused on retaking Catalonia, while remaining on the defensive elsewhere. Although many of the troops captured at Rocroi soon returned to service, in their absence a significant part of Flanders was overrun, including Dunkirk, a major base for Spanish privateers attacking Dutch and French shipping. (Note: Ships based in Dunkirk could enter the North Sea on a single flood tide, which allowed them to raid as far north as the Orkney Islands, and so its closure was an English objective for centuries.) However, Spain's position improved when the Dutch war ended in 1648, along with the outbreak of the Fronde in France.

This allowed Spain to retake most of its lost ground in Flanders, including Ypres, but neither side could gain a significant advantage. In 1650, Spanish success in crushing the Neapolitan Revolt was offset by the loss of Barcelona to French-backed Catalan rebels. Mazarin forced Condé into exile in the Spanish Netherlands in 1651, where his immense prestige in territories adjacent to the Spanish possession of Franche-Comté made him a valuable Spanish ally.

During 1652, Spain recaptured both Dunkirk and Barcelona, and although limited combat continued in Roussillon, the front had stabilised along the modern Pyrenees border. However, the cost of doing so forced Philip to declare bankruptcy again, while the end of the Fronde allowed Mazarin to resume attacks on Milan and thus threaten southern Austria. The attempt failed despite support from Savoy, Modena and Portugal. By now, the two antagonists were exhausted, with neither able to establish dominance. From 1654 to 1656, French successes at Arras, Landrecies and Saint-Ghislain were offset by Spanish victories at Pavia and Valenciennes. Under pressure from Pope Alexander VII, Mazarin offered peace terms but refused to accept Philip's insistence Condé be restored to his French titles and lands. Since Philip IV viewed this as a personal obligation to Condé, the war continued.

The loss of Dutch naval support after Westphalia in 1648 was remedied by Mazarin in 1657, when he negotiated the Treaty of Paris (1657) with the Commonwealth of England, then engaged in the Anglo-Spanish War (1654–1660). Under its terms, France withdrew support for the exiled Charles II of England, whose supporters joined the Spanish as a result. After the capture of Dunkirk in June 1658, Philip requested a truce, which Mazarin refused, but Oliver Cromwell's death in September led to political chaos in England. Fighting in northern Italy ended when Savoy and Modena agreed to a truce with Spanish commander Caracena.

== Treaty of the Pyrenees and marriage contract ==
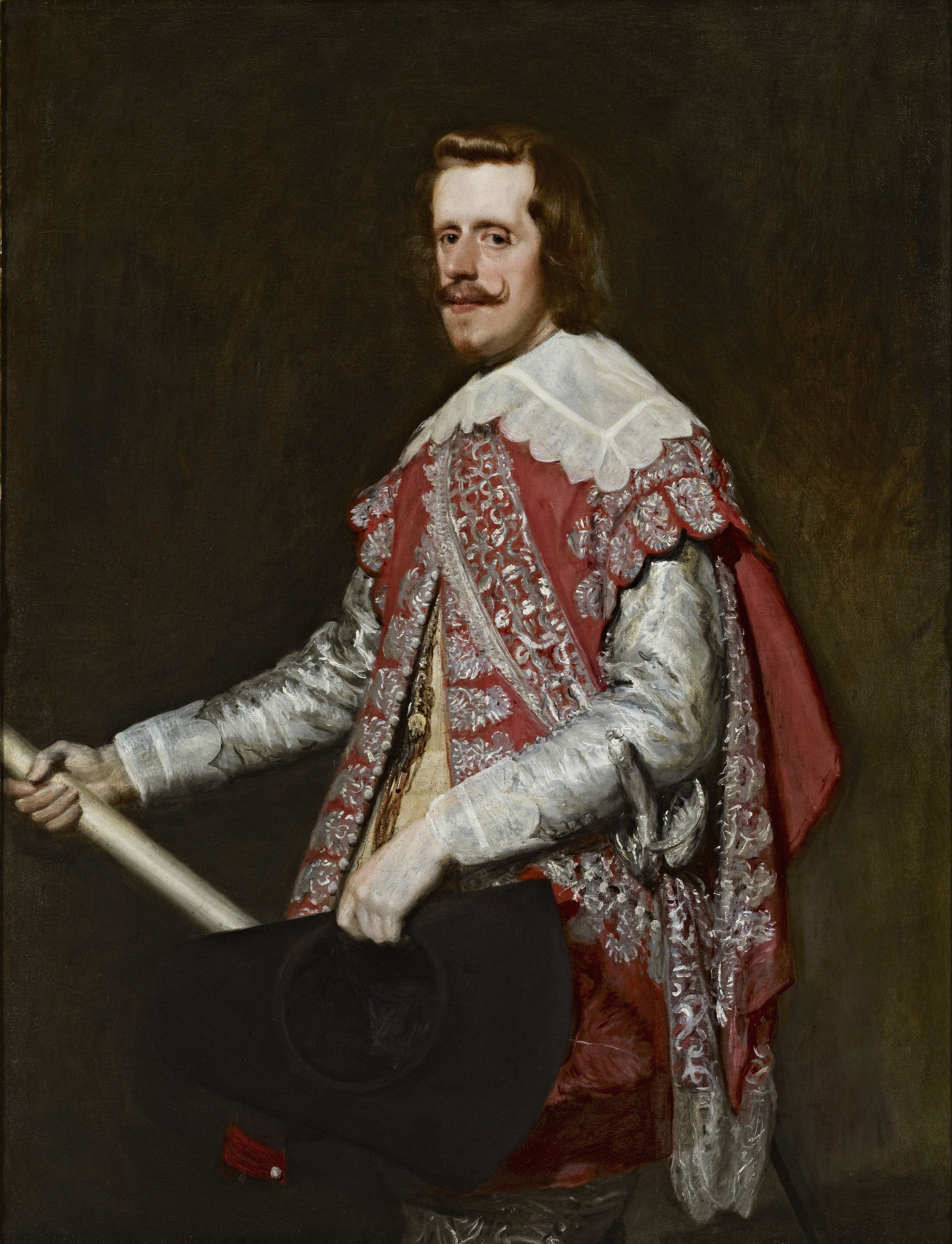
Philip IV of Spain, ruler from 1621 to 1665

On 8 May 1659, France and Spain began negotiating terms; Cromwell's death in September 1658 weakened England, which was allowed to observe but excluded from the talks. Although the Anglo-Spanish War was suspended after the 1660 restoration of Charles II, it did not formally end until the Treaty of Madrid (1667).

Under the Treaty of the Pyrenees, signed on 5 November 1659, France gained Artois and Hainaut along its border with the Spanish Netherlands, as well as Roussillon. These were more significant than often assumed; in combination with the 1648 Treaty of Münster, France strengthened its borders in the east and south-west, while in 1662, Charles II sold Dunkirk to France. Acquisition of Roussillon established the Franco-Spanish border along the Pyrenees, but divided the historic Principality of Catalonia, an event still commemorated each year by French Catalan-speakers in Perpignan. In addition to these territorial loses, Spain was forced to recognize and confirm all of the French territorial gains at the Peace of Westphalia.

France withdrew support from Afonso VI of Portugal, while Louis XIV renounced his claim to be Count of Barcelona, and king of Catalonia. Condé regained his possessions and titles, as did many of his followers, such as the Comte de Montal, but his political power was broken, and he did not hold military command again until 1667.

An integral part of the peace negotiations was the marriage contract between Louis and Maria Theresa. He would subsequently use the terms to justify the 1666 to 1667 War of Devolution, and they formed the basis of French claims for the next 50 years. The marriage was more significant than intended, since it was agreed shortly after Philip's second wife, Mariana of Austria, gave birth to a second son, both of whom died young. Philip died in 1665, leaving his four-year-old son Charles as king, once described as "always on the verge of death, but repeatedly baffling Christendom by continuing to live."

== Financial and military impact ==
Taking on the Spanish Empire, then the strongest military power in Europe, required French forces of unprecedented size and an associated expansion of the taxation and supply base needed to support them. To meet these needs, official estimates for the army expanded from 39,000 in 1630 to around 150,000 shortly before the declaration of war in May 1635. However, in the early stages of the war, French logistics could not yet feed and support such numbers. Within a month of entering the Spanish Netherlands, nearly half the 27,000 men who took part had either fallen ill, or deserted due to lack of pay. Although this improved as time progressed, throughout the war both sides struggled to conduct offensives outside their own territories, as with the 1636 Spanish invasion of northern France.

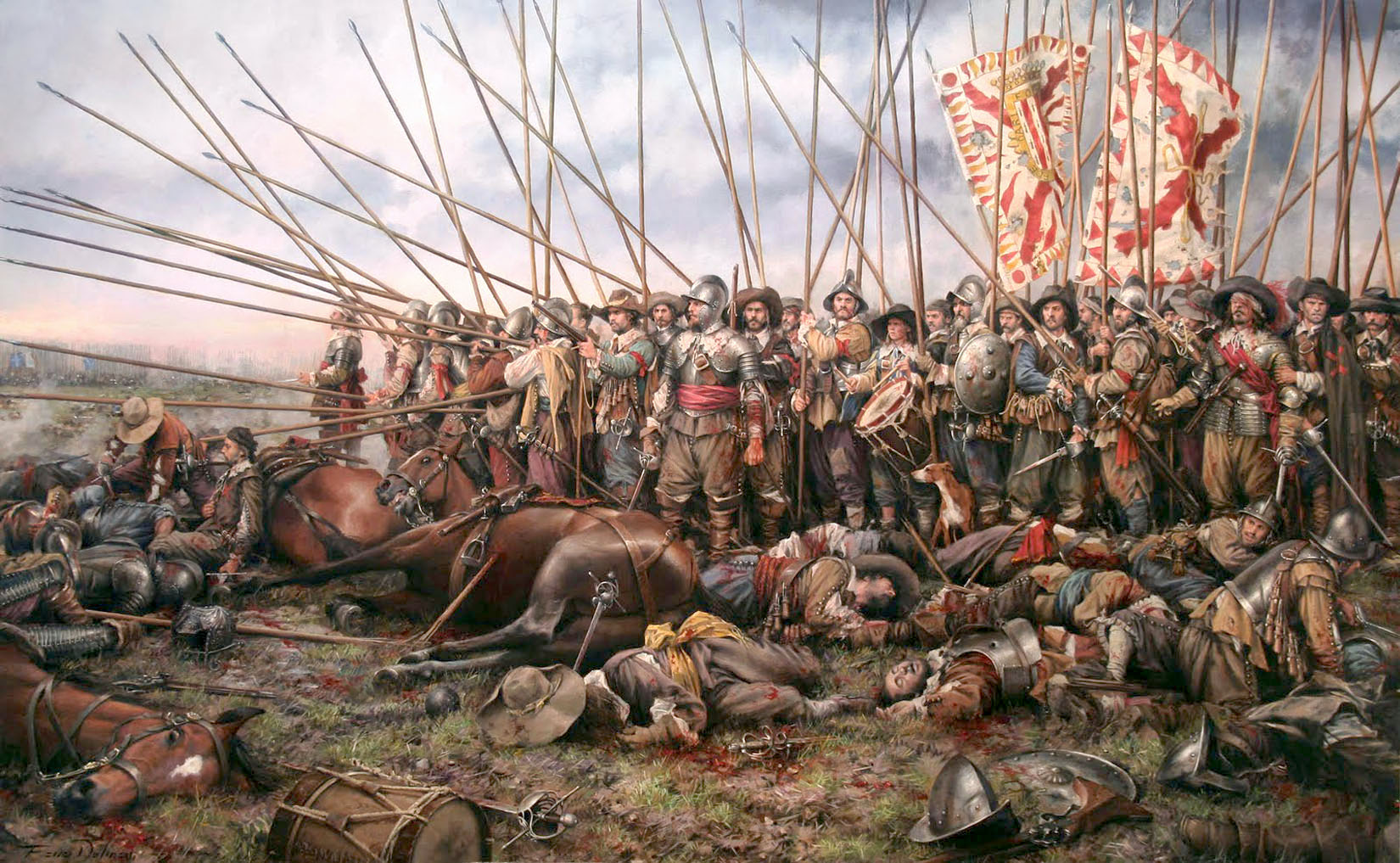
The Battle of Rocroi in 1643 can be seen as the end of the battlefield supremacy of the tercios.

Including those supplied by Bernard of Saxe-Weimar and paid by France, between 1635 and 1642 official troop levels averaged 150,000 to 160,000, with a peak of 211,000 in 1639. These should be treated with caution, since officers were paid for the numbers they reported, rather than those actually present, while up to another 10% was absent due to sickness, although most recovered. Parrott estimates variances between "Reported" and "Actual" averaged up to 35% for the French and 50% for the Spanish, although John A. Lynn suggests 60%.

Throughout the war, military strategy and objectives were often secondary to finding supplies, especially given the primitive infrastructure then available. It was not until the 1660s that Louvois created systems which allowed France to sustain an army of nearly 200,000 men for extended periods, and crucially ensure co-ordinated strategy between different fronts. At the start of the war, the more experienced Spanish were better equipped while their resources made it easier to replace losses. The French sought to negate those advantages by fighting on multiple fronts and supporting anti-Spanish forces in Catalonia, Naples and Portugal. Loss of Dutch naval support after 1648 severely impacted France's ability to challenge the Spanish at sea, until replaced with the English alliance in 1657.

At its peak in 1632, the Spanish army contained around 300,000 regulars and 500,000 local militia, who were in general suitable only for garrison duty. In 1632, only 30% of the Castilian militia possessed firearms, and although this briefly improved, by 1659 this had fallen to less than 13% of the 465,000 listed in their registers. Many were recruited from Castile and Aragon, with some estimates suggesting 288,000 losses during the war, including non-combat related causes. In contrast, French losses were around 300,000 in combat and 200,000 out of combat.

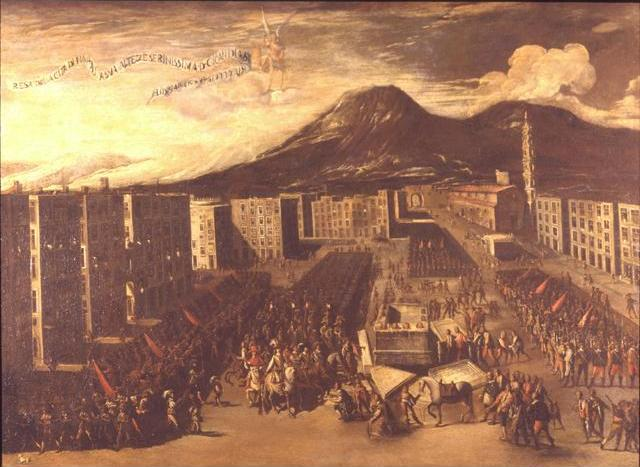
The Spanish retake Naples, April 1648

During the 1630s, the Spanish state increasingly relied on its Italian territories for recruits and money, Milan alone providing around 4,000 recruits and 6 million scudi per year. In addition to maintaining its own forces, from 1630 to 1643 Naples supplied an average of 10,000 recruits a year, an annual subsidy to Madrid of one million ducats, and paid a third of Milan's government expenditures. As a result, its public debt quintupled and by 1648 interest payments constituted 57% of revenue, while taxes tripled between 1618 and 1688, crushing the southern Italian economy. In October 1647, revolts in Sicily and Naples were quickly suppressed, but they exposed the weakness of Spanish rule in Italy and alienation of the local elites from Madrid. In 1650, the governor of Milan claimed only Parma could be relied upon.

== Aftermath and historical assessment ==
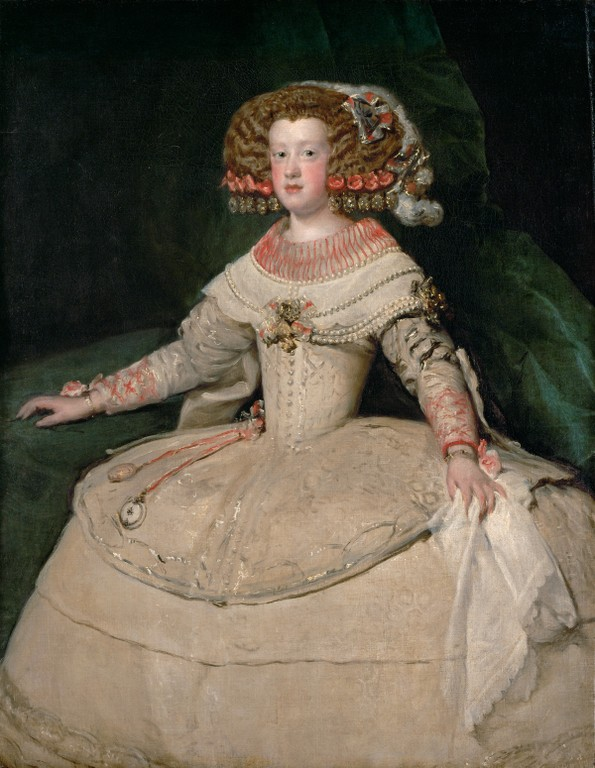
Maria Theresa of Spain, whose marriage to Louis XIV was part of the peace negotiations

Although relatively minor in extent, French territorial gains were strategically significant in terms of securing their southwest and north-east borders. Since traditional historiography portrayed the conflict as starting the process whereby France gradually replaced Spain as the predominant European power, it was often presented as ending in favour of France, but modern analysis suggests a more balanced outcome. Overall, most historians view the conflict as militarily indecisive, with both sides stuck in a stalemate from 1637 to 1659.

The treaty has also been seen as a major foreign policy success for Mazarin, although the terms he ultimately accepted were less favourable than proposed in the 1647 negotiations. One view is Spain escaped surprisingly lightly, considering its position immediately prior to the end of the war.

In territorial terms, Spain remained the predominant European power for decades, but its economic and military power suffered an abrupt decline after 1659. Although Madrid played an important role in the anti-French coalitions that fought Louis XIV in the Franco-Dutch War and the Nine Years' War, it was increasingly unable to defend territories outside Peninsular Spain without foreign support. The Spanish Netherlands, many of whose fortresses were in disrepair and their troops poorly supplied, became particularly vulnerable to French attack.

== Sources ==
- Barrett, John (2015). Better Begging than Fighting: The Royalist Army in exile in the war against Cromwell 1656–1660 (2016 ed.). Helion Publishing. ISBN 978-1910777725.
- Bely, Lucien (2014). Asbach, Olaf; Schröder, Peter (eds.). France and the Thirty Years War in The Ashgate Research Companion to the Thirty Years' War. Ashgate. ISBN 978-1409406297.
- Black, Jeremy (2002). European Warfare, 1494–1660 (Warfare and History). Routledge. ISBN 978-0415275316.
- Black, Jeremy (1991). A Military Revolution?: Military Change and European Society, 1550–1800 (Studies in European history). Palgrave. ISBN 978-0333519066.
- Black, Jeremy (1987). The Origins of War in Early Modern Europe. Donald. ISBN 978-0859761680.
- Bodart, Gaston (1916). Losses of Life in Modern Wars, Austria-Hungary; France (2016 ed.). Wentworth Press. ISBN 978-1371465520.
- Bodart, Gaston (2016). Losses of Life in Modern Wars, Austria-Hungary; France. Wentworth Press. ISBN 978-1371465520.
- Bromley, JS (1987). Corsairs and Navies, 1600–1760. Continnuum-3PL. ISBN 978-0907628774.
- Clark, George (1970). Bromley, J.S. (ed.). The New Cambridge Modern History: Volume 6, The Nine Years War, 1688-97. Cambridge University Press. ISBN 978-0-521-29396-9.
- Chartrand, René (2019). The Armies and Wars of the Sun King 1643–1715. Volume 1: The Guard of Louis XIV. Solihull: Helion & Company Limited. ISBN 978-1911628606.
- Clodfelter, Micheal (2008). Warfare and Armed Conflicts: A Statistical Encyclopedia of Casualty and Other Figures, 1492–2015 (2017 ed.). McFarland. ISBN 978-0786474707.
- Clodfelter, Micheal (2017). Warfare and Armed Conflicts: A Statistical Encyclopedia of Casualty and Other Figures, 1492-2015 (4 ed.). McFarland & Company. ISBN 978-0786474707.
- Collins, James B. (1995). The State in Early Modern France. Cambridge University Press. ISBN 9780521387248.
- Costa, Fernando Dores (2005). "Interpreting the Portuguese War of Restoration (1641–1668) in a European Context". Journal of Portuguese History. 3 (1).
- Darby, Graham (2015). Spain in the Seventeenth Century. Routledge. ISBN 978-1138836440.
- Davenport, Frances Gardiner; Paullin, Charles Oscar, eds. (1917). European Treaties Bearing on the History of the United States and Its Dependencies, Vol. 2: 1650–1697 (2018 ed.). Forgotten Books. ISBN 978-0483158924.
- Durant, Ariel; Durant, Will (1963). Age of Louis XIV (Story of Civilization). TBS Publishing. ISBN 0207942277.
- Ekberg, Carl J (1981). "Abel Servien, Cardinal Mazarin, and the Formulation of French Foreign Policy, 1653–1659". The International History Review. 3 (3): 317–329. doi:10.1080/07075332.1981.9640251. JSTOR 40105147.
- Elliott, J.H. (2002). Imperial Spain 1469-1716. Penguin. ISBN 978-0141007038.
- García Lorenzana, Francisco (2018). La Guerra de los Treinta Años: El ocaso del Imperio español. Kailas Editorial, S.L. ISBN 978-8417248253.
- Hanlon, Gregory (2016). The Twilight Of A Military Tradition: Italian Aristocrats And European Conflicts, 1560–1800. Routledge. ISBN 978-1138158276.
- Hanlon, Gregory (2014). The Hero of Italy: Odoardo Farnese, Duke of Parma, his Soldiers, and his Subjects in the Thirty Years' War. Routledge. ISBN 978-0199687244.
- Hayden, J Michael (1973). "Continuity in the France of Henry IV and Louis XIII: French Foreign Policy, 1598–1615". The Journal of Modern History. 45 (1): 1–23. doi:10.1086/240888. JSTOR 1877591. S2CID 144914347.
- Inglis Jones, James John (1994). The Grand Condé in exile; Power politics in France, Spain and the Spanish Netherlands, 1652–1659 (PHD). Oxford University.
- Israel, Jonathan (1995). The Dutch Republic: Its Rise, Greatness and Fall, 1477–1806. Clarendon Press. ISBN 978-0198730729.
- Israel, Jonathan (1997). Conflicts of Empires: Spain, the Low Countries and the struggle for World Supremacy (2003 ed.). Bloomsbury Academic. ISBN 978-1852851613.
- Israel, Jonathan (2003). Elliott, John (ed.). Spain in the Low Countries, (1635–1643) in Spain, Europe and the Atlantic: Essays in Honour of John H. Elliott. Cambridge University Press. ISBN 978-0521470452.
- Jensen, De Lamar (1985). "The Ottoman Turks in Sixteenth Century French Diplomacy". The Sixteenth Century Journal. 16 (4): 451–470. doi:10.2307/2541220. JSTOR 2541220.
- Jiménez Moreno, Agustín (2017). "España en la era global (1492-1898)". El primer imperio mundial de la Historia. La Monarquía de España en los siglos modernos (1492-1796) (in Spanish). Sílex ediciones. pp. 13–90. ISBN 978-8477376606.
- Kamen, Henry (2002). Spain's Road to Empire (2003 ed.). Allen Lane. ISBN 978-0140285284.
- Knox, Bill (2017). Tucker, Spencer (ed.). The 1635 Treaty of Prague; a failed settlement? in Enduring Controversies in Military History, Volume I: Critical Analyses and Context. Greenwood Press. ISBN 978-1440841194.
- Levy, Jack (1983). War in the Modern Great Power System, 1495–1975 (2015 ed.). University of Kentucky. ISBN 081316365X.
- Luard, Evan (1986). War in International Society: A Study in International Sociology. Tauris. ISBN 978-1850430124.
- Lynch, Jack (1969). Spain Under the Habsburgs: Vol. 11 Spain and America 1598–1700. Basil Blackwell.
- Lynn, John A (1994). "Recalculating French Army Growth during the Grand Siecle, 1610–1715". French Historical Studies. 18 (4): 881–906. doi:10.2307/286722. JSTOR 286722.
- Mackay, Ruth (1999). The Limits of Royal Authority: Resistance and Obedience in Seventeenth-Century Castile. Cambridge University Press. ISBN 978-0521643436.
- Maland, David (1966). Europe in the Seventeenth Century (1983 ed.). Palgrave. ISBN 978-0333335741.
- Mitchell, Andrew Joseph (2005). Religion, revolt, and creation of regional identity in Catalonia, 1640–1643 (PHD). Ohio State University. Archived from the original on 2022-09-24.
- Nimwegen, Olaf van (2020). De Veertigjarige Oorlog 1672–1712: de strijd van de Nederlanders tegen de Zonnekoning [The Forty Years' War 1672–1712: the Dutch struggle against the Sun King] (in Dutch). Prometheus. ISBN 978-90-446-3871-4.
- Ortiz, Antonio Domínguez (1970). La sociedad española en el siglo XVII, vol. I (in Spanish). Editorial Universidad de Granada. ISBN 978-8433816771.
- Parker, Geoffrey (1972). The Army of Flanders and the Spanish Road 1567–1659: The Logistics of Spanish Victory and Defeat in the Low Countries' Wars. Cambridge University Press. ISBN 978-0521084628.
- Parrott, David (2001). Richelieu's Army: War, Government and Society in France, 1624–1642. Cambridge University Press. ISBN 978-0521792097.
- Parrott, David (2006). "France's War against the Habsburgs, 1624–1659: the Politics of Military Failure". In García Hernan, Enrique; Maffi, Davide (eds.). Guerra y Sociedad en La Monarquía Hispánica: Politica, Estrategia y Cultura en la Europa Moderna (1500–1700). Laberinto. ISBN 978-8400084912.
- Poot, Anton (2013). Crucial years in Anglo-Dutch relations (1625–1642): the political and diplomatic contacts. Uitgeverij Verloren. ISBN 978-9087043803.
- Paoletti, Ciro (2007). A Military History of Italy. Praeger Publishers Inc. ISBN 978-0275985059.
- Quainton, C Eden (1935). "Colonel Lockhart and the Peace of the Pyrenees". Pacific Historical Review. 4 (3): 267–280. doi:10.2307/3633132. JSTOR 3633132.
- Quiles Albero, David (2022). Hacia un nuevo orden europeo: Las relaciones entre Madrid y Venecia en el contexto de la Guerra de Candía (1645-1669) (PDF). Mediterranea ricerche storiche. ISBN 978-88-5509-362-0.
- Riches, Daniel (2012). Protestant Cosmopolitanism and Diplomatic Culture: Brandenburg-Swedish Relations in the Seventeenth Century (Northern World). Brill. ISBN 978-9004240797.
- Schneid, Frederick C (2012). The Projection and Limitations of Imperial Powers, 1618–1850. Brill. ISBN 978-9004226715.
- Serra, Eva (2008). "The Treaty of the Pyrenees, 350 Years Later". Catalan Historical Journal. 1 (1). doi:10.2436/20.1000.01.6.
- Stradling, RA (1994). Spain's Struggle For Europe, 1598–1668. Hambledon Press. ISBN 978-1852850890.
- Stradling, Robert (1979). "Castrophe and Recovery: The Defeat of Spain, 1639–43". History. 64 (11): 205–219. doi:10.1111/j.1468-229X.1979.tb02059.x. JSTOR 24411536.
- Sutherland, NM (1992). "The Origins of the Thirty Years War and the Structure of European Politics". English Historical Review. 107 (424).
- Tucker, Spencer C (2011). A Global Chronology of Conflict: From the Ancient World to the Modern Middle East. Vol. II. ABC-CLIO.
- Van Gelderen, Martin (2002). Republicanism and Constitutionalism in Early Modern Europe: A Shared European Heritage Volume I. Cambridge University Press. ISBN 978-0521802031.
- Van Nimwegen, Olaf (2014). Asbach, Olaf; Schröder, Peter (eds.). The Dutch-Spanish War in the Low Countries 1621–1648 in The Ashgate Research Companion to the Thirty Years' War. Ashgate. ISBN 978-1409406297.
- Wedgwood, CV (1938). The Thirty Years War (2005 ed.). New York Review of Books. ISBN 978-1590171462.
- White, Lorraine (2002). "The Experience of Spain's Early Modern Soldiers: Combat, Welfare and Violence". War in History. 9 (1): 1–38. doi:10.1191/0968344502wh248oa. PMID 20191681.
- Wilson, Charles (1976). Transformation of Europe, 1558–1648. Littlehampton Book Services Ltd. ISBN 978-0297770152.
- Wilson, Peter (2009). Europe's Tragedy: A History of the Thirty Years War. Allen Lane. ISBN 978-0713995923.
