= María Calderón =

Spanish royal mistress (1605–1678,)

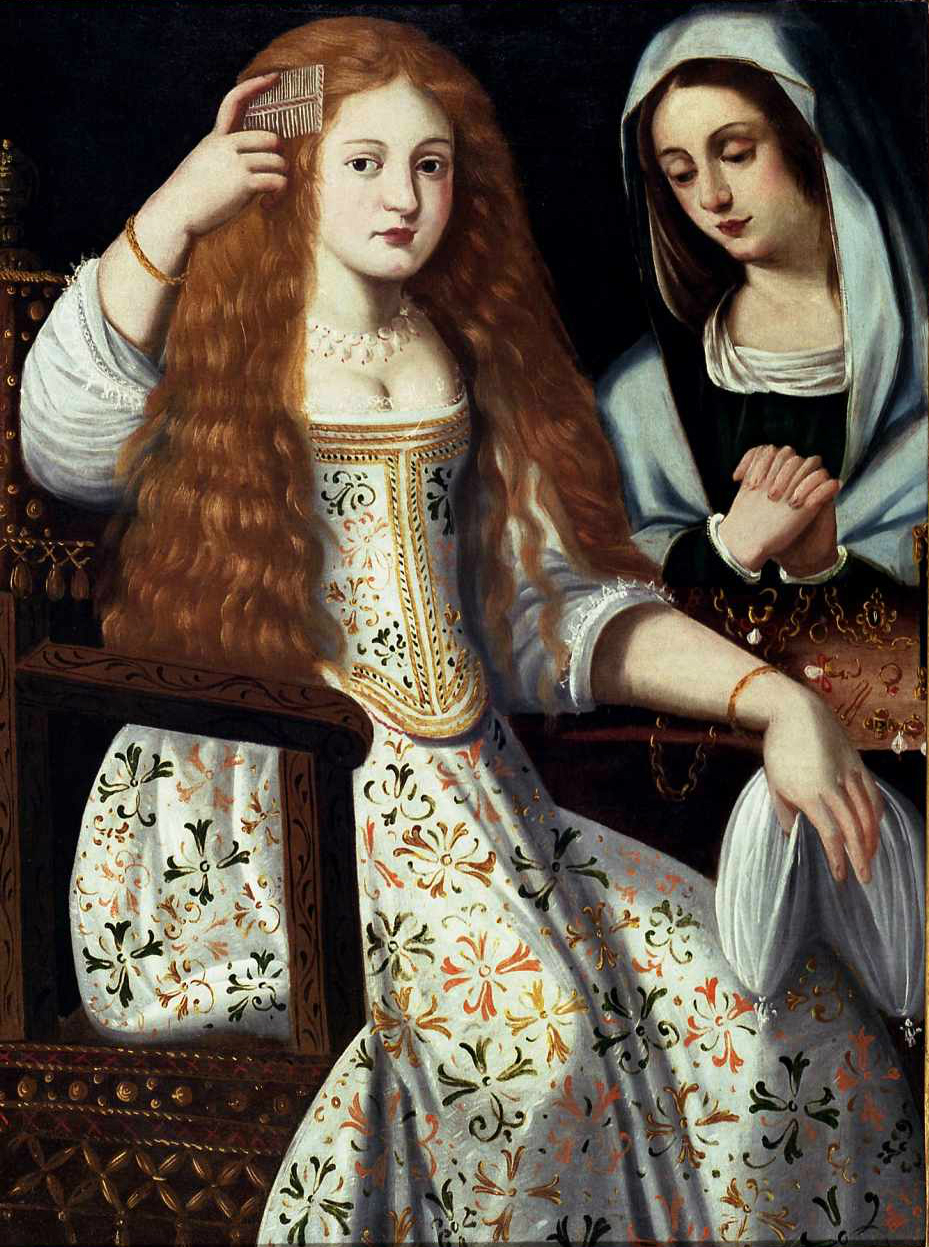
- Born: María Inés Calderón; 1605; Madrid, Spain
- Died: 1678 (aged 72–73); Guadalajara, Spain
- Other names: La Calderona; Marizápalos
- Occupation: Actress
- Partner: Philip IV of Spain
- Children: John of Austria the Younger

María Inés Calderón (1605, in Madrid – 1678, in Guadalajara) also known as La Calderona and Marizápalos, was a Spanish actress, the mistress of Philip IV and the mother of his only recognized natural son, John of Austria the Younger.

== Biography ==
María Calderón attracted the attention of the monarch upon her debut at the theatre de Corral de la Cruz in Madrid in 1627. She was at the time romantically involved with Ramiro Pérez de Guzmán, Duke of Medina de las Torres, widower of the daughter of Gaspar de Guzmán y Pimentel. The King forced her to quit her career and installed her in a palace in Madrid. Upon the birth of her son in 1629, she lost the custody of him despite her protests. Her relationship with the king ended the same year. There were rumors at the time that her son was fathered by Ramiro Pérez de Guzmán.

In March 1642, María Calderón was forced to become a nun against her will. She retired to the monastery of San Juan Bautista of Valfermoso of the Nuns, in the Province of Guadalajara in the Utande Valley. She became abbess in 1643.

== Legacy ==
The Sierra Calderona (Valencian: Serra Calderona) range at the Eastern end of the Iberian System was formerly known as Monts de Porta Coeli, after the Carthusian Monastery of Porta Coeli located in the mountains. The present-day name Calderona originated in the 17th century when María Calderón "La Calderona", hid from King Felipe IV in these mountains among the highwaymen.

== In music ==
The romanca "Marizapalos" by Gaspar Sanz, who taught the king's only recognized natural born son by Maria, tells the risque story of the niece of a priest who neglecting her studies picks flowers and accepts the love of a young man.
