= Neapolitan Revolt of 1647 =

Popular revolt

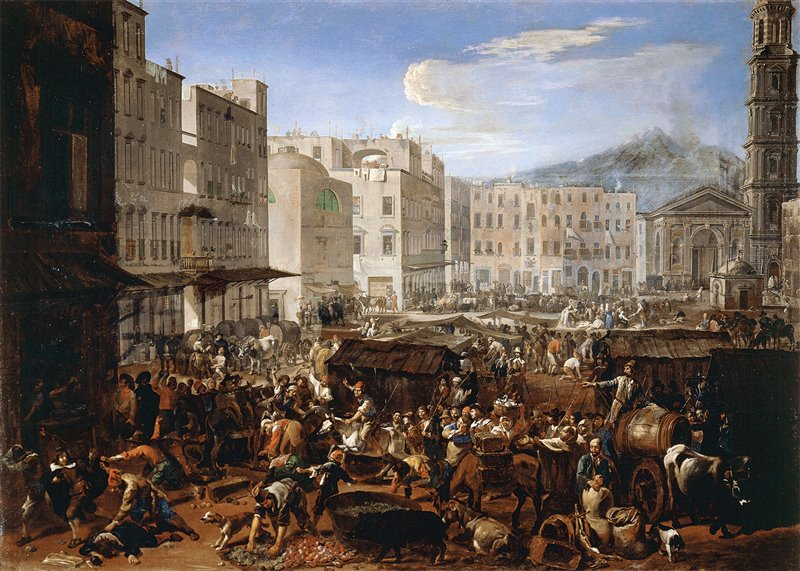
- The revolt in Naples
Date	7 July – 16 July 1647
Location	Southern Italy (at the time Kingdom of Naples)
Result	Neapolitan victory
Territorial changes	Establishment of the Neapolitan Republic

Belligerents
Neapolitan rebels	Spanish Empire

Commanders and leaders
Masaniello; Giulio Genoino	Philip IV; Rodrigo Ponce

Strength
~100,000	Unknown

Casualties and losses
10,000 rebels killed	1,500 nobles and retainers killed

The Neapolitan Revolt of 1647 was a popular revolt by the people of Naples led by Tommaso Aniello (known as Masaniello). Throughout the Thirty Years' War, rage and discontent arose among the Neapolitan residents against the ruling Spanish Duke of Arcos Rodrigo Ponce. The rebellion was a success and the most famous event was the Fire of Piazza Mercato.

== Background ==
The Thirty Years' War was very costly for the Spanish, and because of this, they put taxes on fruit and other ordinary foods. The people raged, so they followed the ideals of the previous revolt in Palermo and the latter succeeded, gaining the independence of the Neapolitan Republic.

== Aftermath ==
The Republic did not last very long. A year later, the Spanish managed to restore the older Kingdom of Naples after John Joseph of Austria shelled the town and defeated the rebels with the famous tercios.
