= Masaniello =

Italian fisherman and leader of the Neapolitan Revolt of 1647

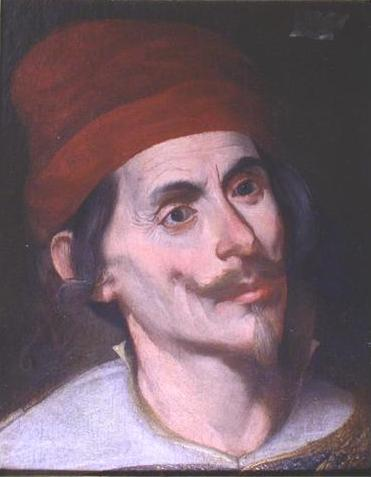
Masaniello is one of the most popular figures in Neapolitan tradition. Contemporary portrait by Onofrio Palumbo

Tommaso Aniello (29 June 1620 – 16 July 1647), popularly known by the contracted name of Masaniello (Italian: [mazaˈnjɛlːo], Neapolitan: [masaˈnjelːə]), was an Italian fisherman, who led the Neapolitan Revolt of 1647 against the rule of Habsburg Spain in the Kingdom of Naples.

== Name and place of birth ==
Until recently it was believed that Masaniello was a native of Amalfi, when in fact he was born in Vico Rotto al Mercato, one of the many lanes around the market square in Naples. The source of this misunderstanding is that Amalfi was simply part of his name, but has been traditionally interpreted as a reference to his place of origin. Some sources do argue that Tommaso Aniello was born in Amalfi, where he was a friend of another unique character, Abbot Pirone, so named because he improperly used his habit to escape justice but who was, in reality, a bandit who would kill for a fee, and who would have been Tommaso's collaborator during the Neapolitan uprising. In 1896, the poet Salvatore Di Giacomo resolved the confusion around Masaniello and Amalfi by transcribing the act of baptism found in the Church of Santa Caterina which cites:

"On June 29, 1620 Tommaso Aniello son of Cicco d'Amalfi and Antonia Gargano was baptized by me Don Giovanni Matteo Peta, and lifted from the sacred font by Agostino Monaco and Giovanna de Lieto in Vico Rotto."

The celebration took place on the day of birth, and in the same church where in 1641 Tommaso Aniello would later marry the sixteen-year-old Bernardina Pisa. The historian Giuseppe Galasso suggested that the misunderstanding "was fostered and encouraged by a conscious attitude of power and official culture in Spanish Naples. The faithful city [...] was not to be and could not admit the presence of an infidel, a rebel and one who had questioned the Spanish government in Naples." On 7 July 1997, at the 350th anniversary of the popular uprising, the City of Naples placed an inscription in honour of Masaniello in Vico Rotto al Mercato.

== From birth to 1647 ==
Masaniello's family was humble but not poor. His father, Francesco (Cicco) d'Amalfi was a fisherman and shopkeeper. His mother, Antonia Gargano was a housekeeper who became pregnant with Masaniello before her marriage. He had two younger brothers and one sister: Giovanni, who was another leader of the rebellion; Francesco, who died in infancy; and Grazia. The house where he lived was in the Pendino quarter, where the tax on fish was collected, and close to Porta Nolana which dealt with the duty on flour.

At the time, Naples had about 250,000 inhabitants, and was one of the most populous metropolises in Europe. Market Square, where Masaniello spent his whole life, was the nerve centre. It housed stalls selling all manner of goods, it was where acrobats performed for the common people and, in the days of Conrad of Swabia, had been the place for public executions.

During the 1640s, Habsburg Spain was faced with a long series of disastrous conflicts: the revolt of the Netherlands (1568–1648), the Thirty Years' War (1618–1648), the Revolt of Catalonia (1640–1659), and the secession of Portugal (1640–1668). To support the war effort, the Iberian Crown imposed a heavy tax burden on the Viceroy of Naples in order to restore the coffers of its vast empire, whose Golden Age was inevitably coming to an end.

Masaniello, a fisherman and fishmonger like his father, was described by his contemporaries as:

...a young man of twenty-seven, beautiful and graceful in appearance, his face was brown and somewhat burned by the sun: black eyes, blond hair, with locks that ran down his neck.

Often, to escape taxation, he brought the fish directly to the homes of nobles, but was almost always caught in the act by the tax collectors and imprisoned. His main activity was, however, smuggling, so much so that in 1646 his reputation as a skilled smuggler was already well-established in the Market. He worked mainly for the feudal nobility, including the Marchesa di Brienza and don Diomede Carafa, Duke of Maddaloni, who treated him almost like a slave. His wife Bernardina, arrested for bringing to town a sock full of flour, and evading duty, was imprisoned for eight days. To obtain her freedom, Masaniello was forced to pay a ransom of one hundred crowns, which brought him into debt. According to tradition, it was this episode that provoked in him a desire to avenge the people against their oppressors.

During a stay in prison, he met the "Grand Admiral" and Doctor of Law Marco Vitale, the illegitimate son of a famous lawyer, who brought him into contact with some members of the middle class tired of the continuing abuses of the tax collector and privileges of the nobility. Masaniello also became a pupil of the writer Don Giulio Genoino, an octogenarian priest with a past as a defender of the people.

In 1619, during the term of office of Viceroy Don Pedro Téllez-Girón, 3rd Duke of Osuna, Genoino had been called twice to represent the interests of the people against the nobility, essentially playing the role of an ancient tribune. In 1620, however, he had been dismissed by the Consiglio Collaterale and imprisoned far from Naples.

Returning to the city in 1639, he immediately began to fight for the rights of the people around him and formed a large group of agitators, including: Francesco Antonio Arpaja, his old and trusted employee, the Carmelite friar Savino Boccardo, the aforementioned Marco Vitale and the various captains of the city districts, and a great number of "Lazzarini".

== The revolt ==
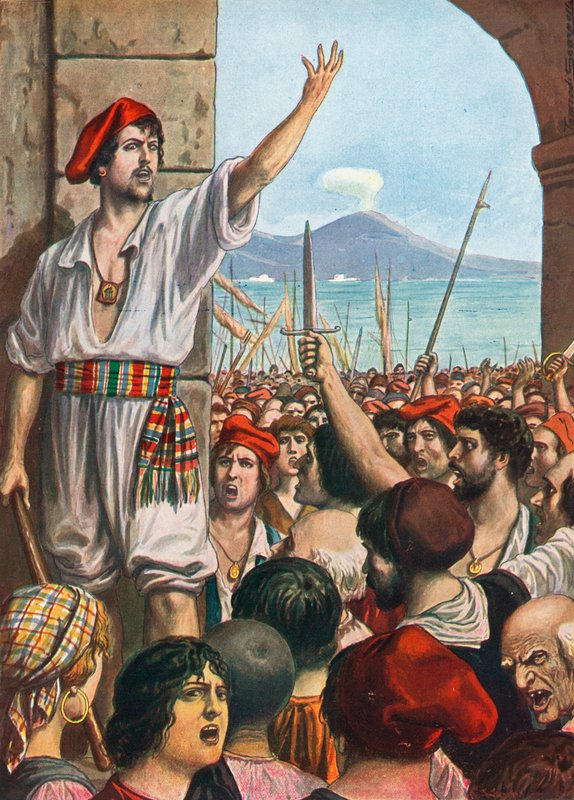
Illustration for Storia d'Italia by Paolo Giudici (Nerbini, 1929–32)

Misgovernment and fiscal oppression during the Thirty Years' War aroused much discontent throughout the Kingdom of Naples. A revolt broke out at Palermo in May 1647, and the people of Naples followed the example of the Sicilians. The immediate occasion of the latter rising was a new tax on fruit and the other ordinary food of the poor, and the chief instigator of the movement was Masaniello, who took command of the malcontents. The outbreak began on 7 July 1647 with a riot at the city gates between the fruit vendors of the environs and the customs officers; the latter were forced to flee, and the customs office was burnt. The rioters then poured into Naples and forced their way into the palace of the viceroy, Rodrigo Ponce de León, the hated Duke of Arcos, who had to take refuge first in a neighbouring convent, then in Castel Sant'Elmo, and finally in Castel Nuovo.

Masaniello attempted to discipline the mob and restrain its destructive instincts, and to some extent he succeeded; attired in his fisherman's garb, he gave audiences and administered justice from a wooden scaffolding outside his house. Several rioters, including the Duke of Maddaloni, an opponent of the viceroy, and his brother Giuseppe Caraffa, who had come to Naples to make trouble, were condemned to death by him and executed. The mob, which every day obtained more arms and was becoming more intractable, terrorized the city, drove off the troops summoned from outside, and elected Masaniello "captain-general"; the revolt was even spreading to the provinces. Genoino and Masaniello demanded parity between people and nobility on the city council and a new charter for Naples. Their purpose was not to tear down the state, but to work with the viceroy in order to dislodge aristocratic control.

Masaniello led a mob of nearly a thousand which ransacked the armouries and opened the prisons, leaving him in charge of the city. Eventually, the viceroy, whose negotiations with Masaniello had been frequently interrupted by fresh tumults, ended by granting all the concessions demanded. On 13 July 1647, through the mediation of Cardinal Ascanio Filomarino, archbishop of Naples, a convention was signed between the Duke of Arcos and Masaniello as "leader of the most faithful people of Naples," by which the rebels were pardoned, the more oppressive taxes removed, and the citizens granted certain rights, including that of remaining in arms until the treaty should have been ratified by the King.

The astute Duke of Arcos then invited Masaniello to the palace, confirmed his title of "captain-general of the Neapolitan people," gave him a gold chain of office, and offered him a pension. Masaniello refused the pension and laid down his dignities, saying that he wished to return to his old life as a fisherman; but he was entertained by the viceroy and, partly owing to the strain and excitement of the past days, partly because he was made dizzy by his astonishing change of fortune, or perhaps, as it was believed, because he was poisoned, he lost his head and behaved like a frenzied maniac.

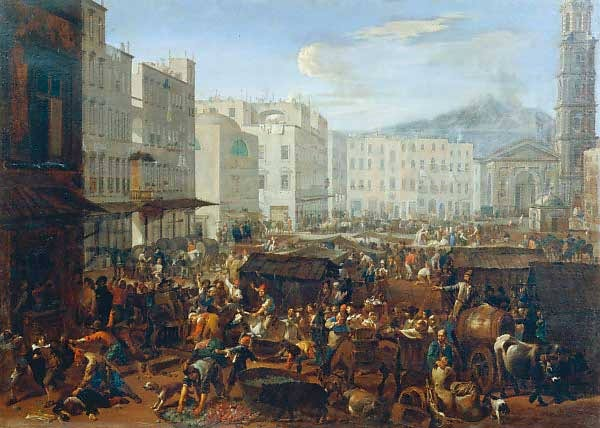
The revolt of Masaniello by Michelangelo Cerquozzi and Viviano Codazzi

The Viceroy gave way, but the nobles of Naples were resistant: there was an attempt to assassinate Masaniello, but then on 13 July, dressed in finery and a golden chair, he was confirmed Captain-General in a solemn ceremony in the cathedral.

Masaniello rapidly and uncannily echoed the irrational behaviour of his populist Roman predecessor, Cola di Rienzo, 300 years before. After escaping from house arrest on 16 July, Masaniello went to the Church of the Carmine where the Archbishop was celebrating mass for the Feast of Our Lady of Carmel. Blaspheming, Masaniello denounced his fellow citizens. He was again arrested and taken to a nearby monastery, where he was assassinated by a group of grain merchants. His head was cut off and brought by a band of roughs to the viceroy and the body was buried outside the city. But the next day the populace, angered by the alteration of the measures for weighing bread, repented of its insane fury; the body of Masaniello was dug up and given a splendid funeral, at which the viceroy himself was represented.

The Viceroy, desperately, tried to leave the city's governance in the hands of Genoino, who proved unable to resist demands from the streets. Extremists took over. A second revolution took place in August, which culminated in Genoino's exile and the proclamation of a Neapolitan Republic under French protection. The Spanish eventually recovered Naples in April 1648.

== Masaniello in art and political theory ==
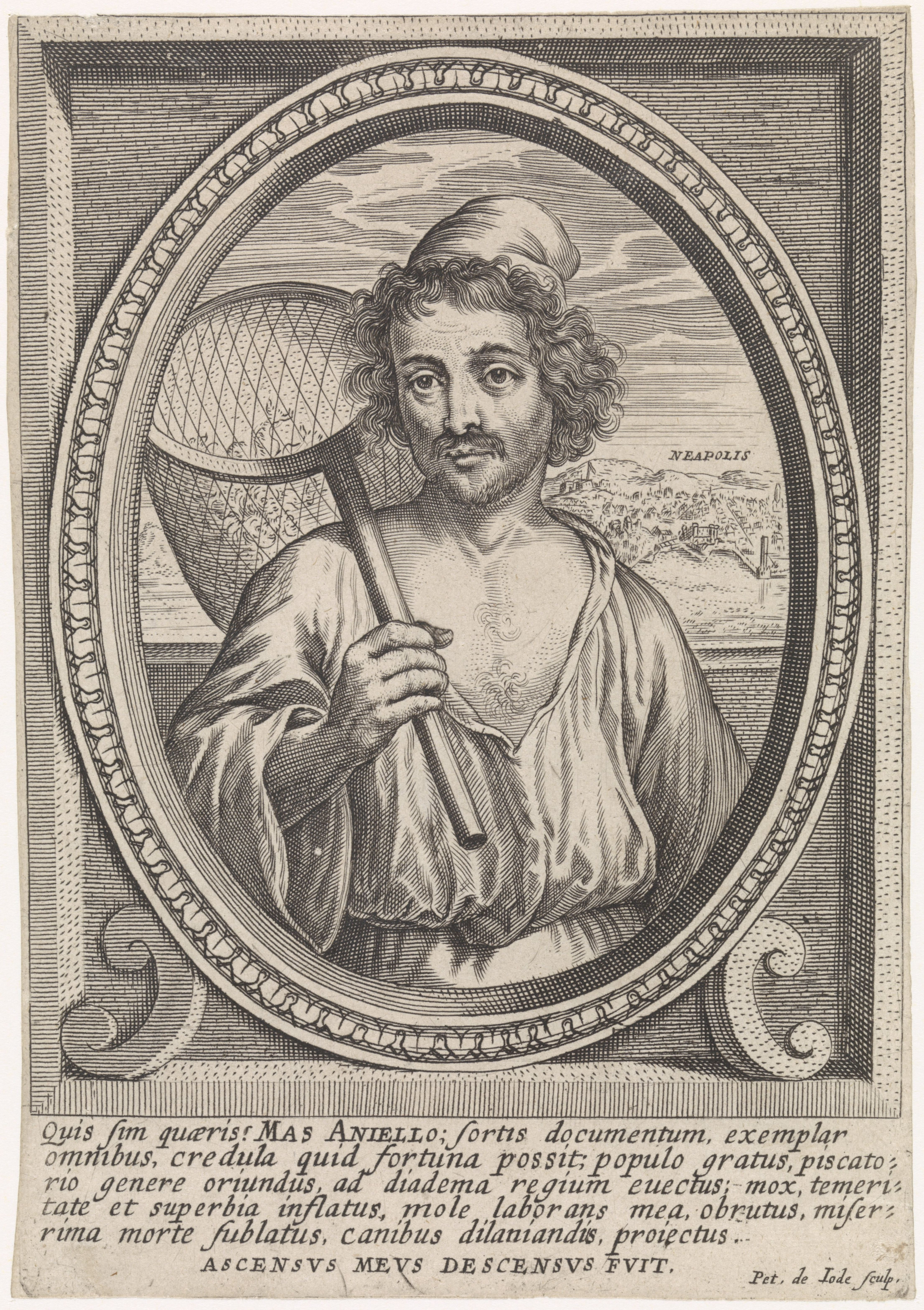
Reproduction of Spinoza's drawing as the revolutionary Masaniello.

Masaniello was portrayed many times in Neapolitan pictures of the centuries following his death.

- The philosopher Baruch Spinoza reportedly sketched a portrait of Masaniello with a face very similar to his own; an apparent self-portrait of the philosopher as a fisherman in a shirt, with a net thrown over his shoulder, a pose made familiar by portraits of Masaniello.
- Masaniello was used in John Locke's reductio ad absurdum of Robert Filmer's position in the former's First Treatise of Government. Taking Filmer to believe that might is right, Locke stated: "had [Filmer] had the happiness to live under Massanello's [sic] government, he could not by this his own rule have forborne to have done homage to him, with O king live for ever, since the manner of his government by supreme power, made him properly king, who was but the day before properly a fisherman."
- Masaniello's revolt was condemned by several Neapolitan poets, including Antonio Muscettola, Antonio de Rossi, Vincenzo Zito, and the Jesuit Giacomo Lubrano (who included a regretful reference to the British treatment of Charles I).
- Advocating "a government of our own" in Common Sense, Thomas Paine evoked the spectre of a rabble-rouser like Masaniello: "it is infinitely wiser and safer, to form a constitution of our own in a cool deliberate manner, while we have it in our power, than to trust such an interesting event to time and chance. If we omit it now, some Massanello [sic] may hereafter arise, who laying hold of popular disquietudes, may collect together the desperate and discontented, and by assuming to themselves the powers of government, may sweep away the liberties of the continent like a deluge."
- Masaniello's insurrection appealed to the imagination of poets and composers, and formed the subject of several operas, including Reinhard Keiser's Masaniello furioso (1706), Daniel Auber's La Muette de Portici (1828), and Jacopo Napoli's (1953) Mas' Aniello. Of these, La muette de Portici had Masaniello appearing on stage and calling the Neapolitan fishermen to arms had the effect of making the audience leave the hall and pour into the streets of Brussels to start the real-life Belgian Revolution of 1830.
- Christian Weise, the political scientist and educator of the German political elite, portrayed Masaniello in a school drama that warned the German princes against abusing the prerogatives they had gained at the end of the Thirty Years' War with the Peace of Westphalia
- The 2019 biopic of Argentine footballer Diego Maradona produced by Asif Kapaddi shows an interview featuring Maradona in which the broadcaster Gianni Mina compares Maradona with Masaniello. Famously Maradona had asked the people of Naples to support his Argentine team in the semi-final of the World Cup 1990. Argentina went on to win.

== See also ==
- History of Naples
- Neapolitan Republic (1647)
- Giulio Genoino
- Gennaro Annese
