= Luis de Benavides Carrillo, Marquis of Caracena =

Spanish general and political figure

Luis Francisco de Benavides Carrillo de Toledo 5th Marquis of Fromista 3rd Marquis of Caracena 3rd Count of Pinto
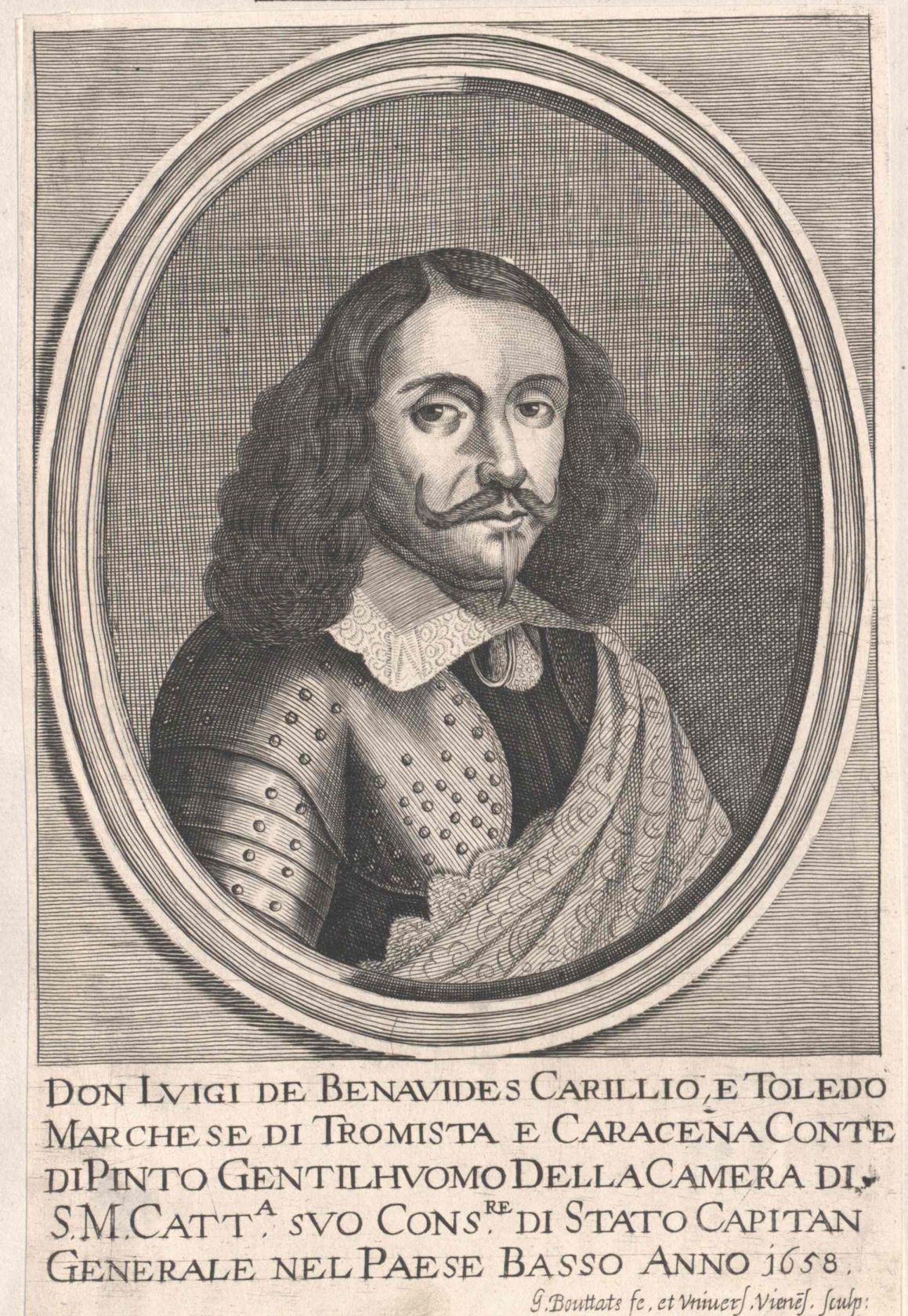
- A 1636 portrait of the Marquis of Caracena
- Born: 20 September 1608; Valencia, Kingdom of Valencia, Crown of Aragon, Spanish Empire
- Died: 6 January 1668 (aged 59); Madrid, Spanish Empire
- Spouse: Catalina Ponce de León Córdoba de Aragón
- Children: Ana Antonia de Benavides Ponce de León, 4th Marquess de Caracena; María de Benavides Ponce de León
- Relatives: Luis III de Benavides, 4th Marquis de Fromista (father); Ana Carrillo de Toledo (mother); Isabel de Benavides Velasco y Mendoza (sister)
- Military career
- Allegiance: Spanish Empire
- Branch: Spanish Army
- Service years: 1629–1659
- Units: Spanish Army of Italy; Army of Flanders
- Conflicts: Franco-Spanish War (1635–1659): Battle of the Dunes (1658); Portuguese Restoration War: Battle of Ameixial (1663); Battle of Montes Claros; War of the Mantuan Succession: Capture of the Casale Monferrato, Crescentino and Trino fortress

Governor of the Duchy of Milan
- In office 25 June 1648 – 2 December 1655
- Monarch: Philip IV
- Valido: Luis de Haro
- Preceded by: Bernardino Fernández de Velasco, 6th Duke of Frías
- Succeeded by: Gian Giacomo Teodoro Trivulzio

Governor-General of the Spanish Netherlands
- In office 13 November 1659 – September 1664
- Monarch: Philip IV
- Valido: Luis de Haro
- Preceded by: John Joseph of Austria
- Succeeded by: Francisco de Moura Corte Real, 3rd Marquis of Castelo Rodrigo

Governor of Extremadura
- In office February 1665 – 1667
- Monarchs: Philip IV; Charles II
- Regent: Mariana of Austria
- Preceded by: John Joseph of Austria

President of the Supreme Council of Flanders
- In office 1667 – 6 January 1668
- Monarch: Charles II
- Regent: Mariana of Austria
- Valido: Juan Everardo Nithard
- Preceded by: Antonio Sancho Davila, Marquis of Velada
- Succeeded by: Francisco de Moura Corte Real, 3rd Marquis of Castelo Rodrigo

Luis Francisco de Benavides Carrillo de Toledo, Marquis of Caracena, Marquis of Fromista (20 September 1608 – 6 January 1668) was a Spanish general and political figure. He served as Governor of the Habsburg Netherlands between 1659 and 1664.

== Early life ==
Born in Valencia, a member of a noble Spanish family, he made a career in the army during the many battles in Italy and Flanders between 1629 and 1659.

== Career ==
He conquered the fortress of Casale Monferrato in 1652.

He was Governor of Milan between 1648 and 1656. After the defeat of John of Austria the Younger in the Battle of the Dunes (1658), Caracena was appointed to succeed him. After the conclusion of the Treaty of the Pyrenees, the Habsburg Netherlands saw a period of relative peace. Despite this fact, governing wasn't easy for Caracena, since by then various wars had pushed Spain to the brink of bankruptcy.

In 1664 he returned to Spain to assume command of the war against Portugal, which was going poorly after a series of military setbacks, most recently after the defeat in 1663 in the Battle of Ameixial, near Estremoz of the same John of Austria the Younger. Caracena's command of the Spanish forces in Portugal was brief; he was decisively defeated by António Luís de Meneses at the Battle of Montes Claros in 1665. The defeat effectively ended the War of Restoration in favor of the Portuguese.

After the battle, Caracena was charged with treason and cowardice. He defended himself by claiming that he was not to blame, but rather the defeat was due to the poor state of the Spanish army, intrigue in the Spanish Court, and the lack of funds to protract a war against Portugal. Afterwards, he was disregarded by the Spanish Crown and died of disease in Madrid in 1668.

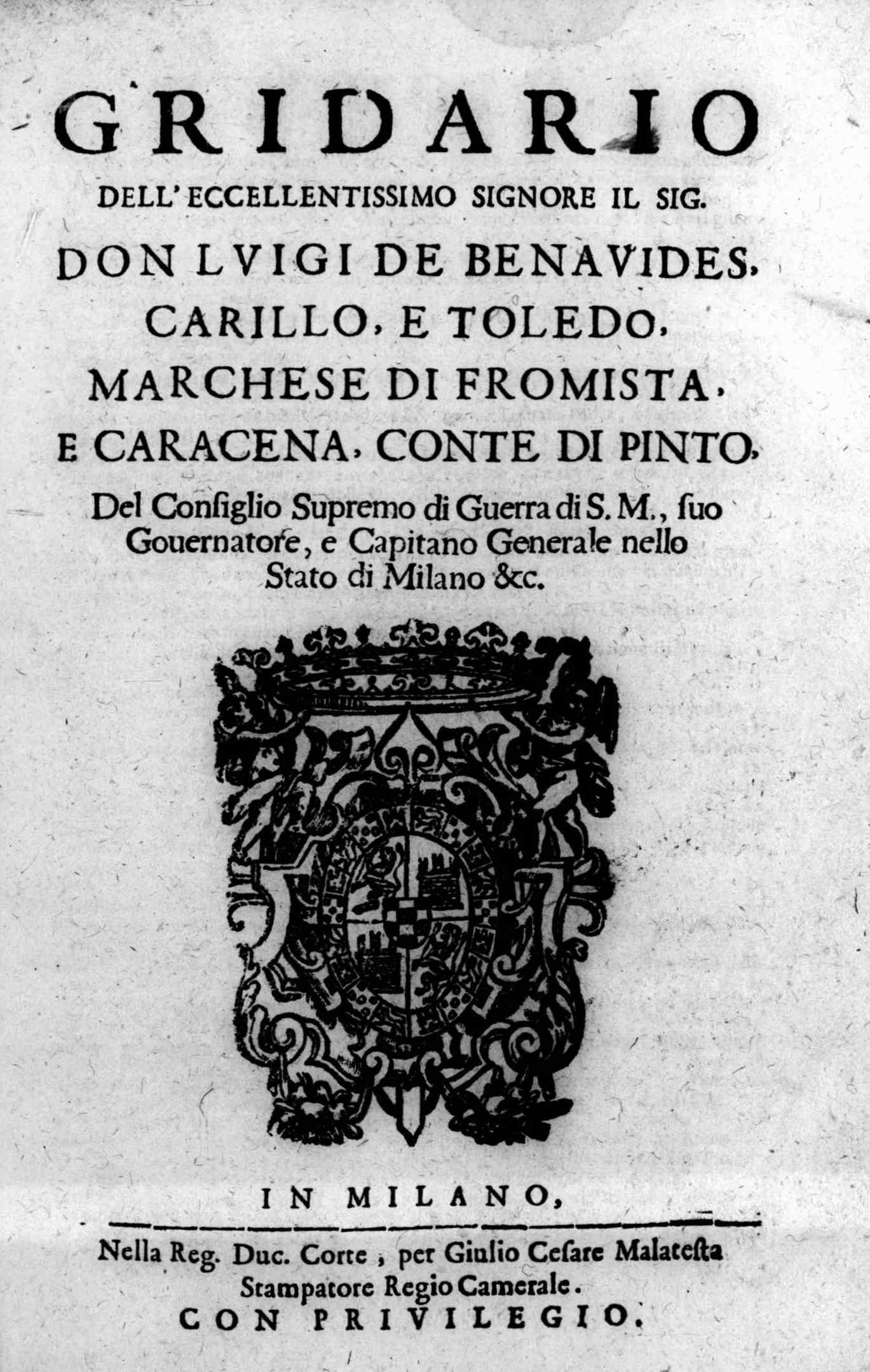
Gridario, Milan 1650

Political offices
Preceded by Bernardino Fernández de Velasco, 6th Duke of Frías	Governor of the Duchy of Milan; 1648–1656	Succeeded by Cardinal Teodoro Trivulzio
Preceded by John of Austria the Younger	Governor-General of the Spanish Netherlands; 1659–1664	Succeeded by The Marquis of Castel Rodrigo
