= Carlo Coppola =

Italian painter

Carlo Coppola (17th century) was an Italian painter of the Baroque period, active in his natal city of Naples. He was a pupil of the battle-painter Aniello Falcone, and was adept at the same topic. He is said to have enjoyed himself during the day, thus spending his nights painting by candlelight, only within a short time to become blind.

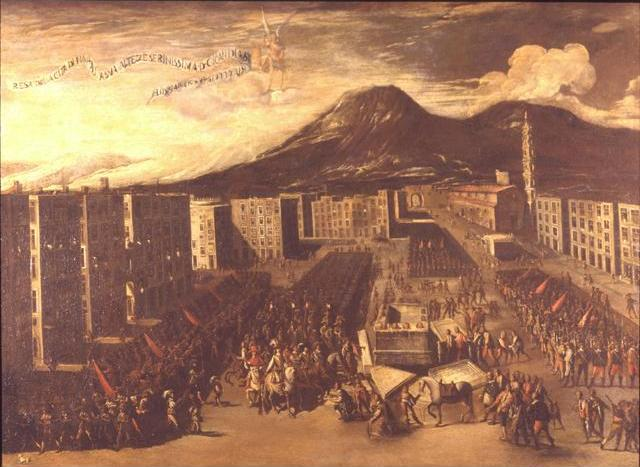
Surrender of Naples to Don Juan José de Austria in 1648

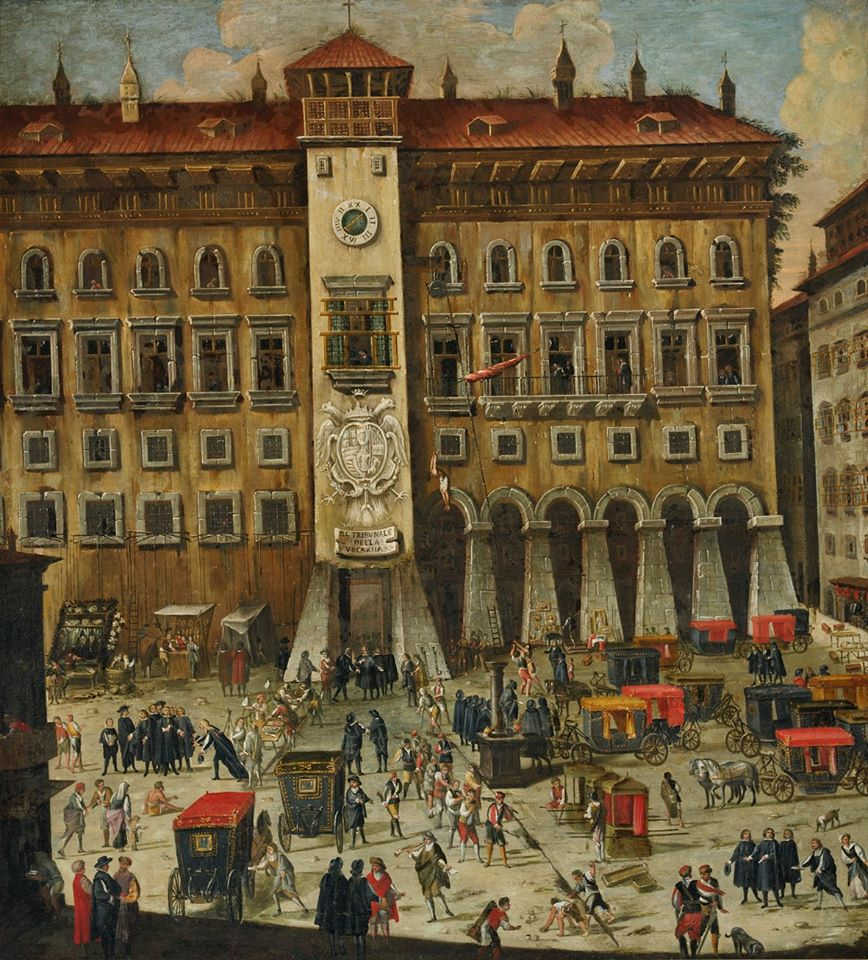
Tribunal della Vicaria at Castel Capuana (attributed to Coppola
