= Romanza (Sephardic music) =

Music genre

The romanza or romanca is a variant of the medieval Spanish musical romance or ballad which is one of the two main genres of Sephardic music. The text consists of 16-syllable verses, each one divided in the middle into a pair of isometric hemistiches of 8 syllables by a cesura.
