= Carmine Castle =

Castle in Naples, Italy

- Castello del Carmine
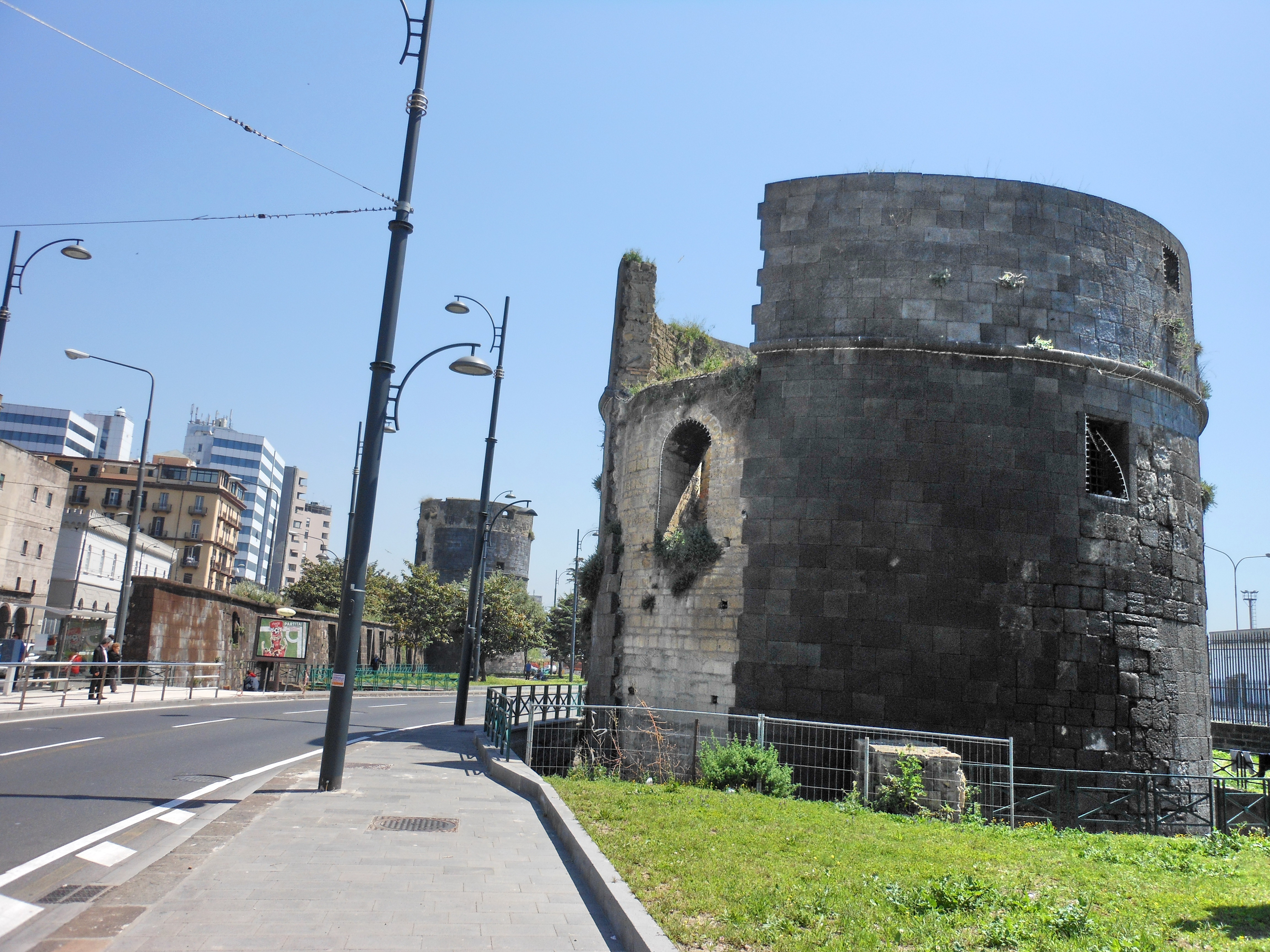
- The remnants of the Castello del Carmine in Naples

Site information
- Type: Castle
- Owner: The commune of Naples
- Open to the public: no
- Condition: demolished

Location
- Coordinates: 40°50′46″N 14°16′07″E

Site history
- Built: 14th century – 18th century
- Materials: Tuff with piperno reinforcements
- Demolished: 1906
- Events: Key fortress during the battles of the Parthenopean Republic in 1799

The Carmine Castle (Italian: Castello del Carmine) was a castle in Naples, Italy. It was one of the fortifications built by the Spaniards under viceroy Pedro Álvarez de Toledo in the mid-16th century as part of the Spanish plans to surround the city with walls and forts. It stood at what was then the south-east corner of the walled city, that wall then turning in to the north. The fortress had great strategic value in the military history of the city up to and including the defense of the Neapolitan Republic of 1799 against the returning royalist forces of King Ferdinand IV. The castle was partially demolished in 1900 as part of Naples' great urban renewal to make room for a road along the sea. Two towers and fragmentary ruins still stand as historic markers.
