= Rodrigo Ponce de León, 4th Duke of Arcos =

Spanish noble statesman

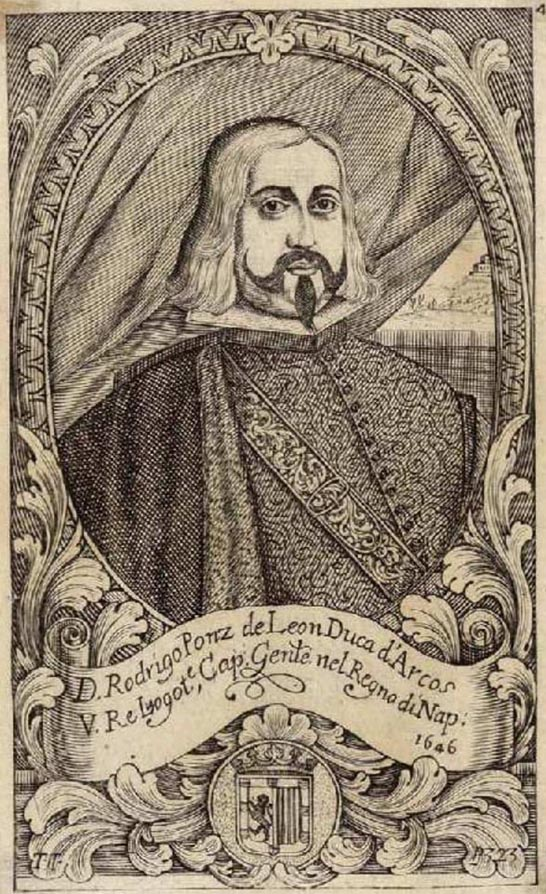
Rodrigo Ponce de León, 4th Duke of Arcos

Rodrigo Ponce de León y Álvarez de Toledo, 4th Duke of Arcos, (2 January 1602 – 1658) was a Grandee of Spain and a Knight of the Order of the Golden Fleece. He served as Viceroy of Valencia and of Naples.

== Biography ==
He was the son of Luis Ponce de León y Zúñiga (1573–1605), 5th Marquis of Zahara, son of the 3rd Duke of Arcos and of Victoria de Álvarez de Toledo y Colonna. His younger brother was Luis de Guzmán Ponce de Leon, Governor of the Duchy of Milan.
He married Ana Francisca de Aragón y Córdoba, daughter of Enrique de Aragón, Duke of Segorbe, with whom he had three sons.

As Viceroy of Naples, the Duke of Arcos suppressed a revolt by inhabitants of the city of Naples led by Masaniello but was soon faced with another revolt against Spanish rule, which resulted in the proclamation of the short-lived Neapolitan Republic.

Government offices
Preceded by Francisco de Borja, Duque de Gandia	Viceroy of Valencia; 1642–1645	Succeeded by Duarte Fernández, Count of Oropesa
Preceded by Juan Alfonso Enríquez de Cabrera y Colonna, count of Modica, 1600 - 1647	Viceroy of Naples; 1646–1648	Succeeded by John of Austria the Younger
Spanish nobility
Preceded by Rodrigo Ponce de León, 3rd Duke of Arcos	Duke of Arcos; 1630–1658	Succeeded by Francisco Ponce de León, 5th Duke of Arcos
Preceded by Luis Ponce de León, 5th Marquis of Zahara	Marquis of Zahara; 1605–1632	Succeeded by Francisco Ponce de León, 5th Duke of Arcos
