= Giulio Genoino =

Italian priest; key figure in the Neapolitan Revolt of 1647

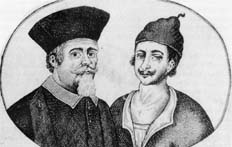
- Giulio Genoino and Masaniello in a picture of the 18th century
- Born: 1567; Cava de' Tirreni
- Died: January 1648 (aged 80–81); Mahón
- Occupation: Catholic priest, lawyer, Journalist, utopian

Giulio Genoino (born c. 1565 in Cava de' Tirreni), the 'mind of Masaniello', was a key figure in the 7 July 1647 popular insurrection against Spanish authority in the Kingdom of Naples.

== Biography ==
A priest, lawyer, and academic, Genoino had for three decades attempted to influence constitutional change to involve the Third Estate in the government of the city. However, he was accused of spreading sedition and instigating riots against local nobility during unrest in 1585. In May 1619, he was appointed electo with the support of Viceroy of Naples Pedro Téllez-Girón, Duke of Osuna, who shared his support for the common people and his opposition to the Neapolitan nobility. With the end of Osuna's mandate, Genoino was forced to exile himself from the city.

After periods of imprisonment and exile, and then in his 80s, he returned to Naples and began advising the fisherman and smuggler Tommaso Aniello—later known as Masaniello—a popular figure among the city's populace. Genoino was the real power behind the popular movement, and supplied the directionless and illiterate Masaniello with advice and a coherent policy. Following the uprising of 7 July, and the assassination of Masaniello on 16 July, the Viceroy attempted to restore order by handing governance of the city to Genoino. He was unable to resist the most extreme demands of the populace. Following a second revolution in August, Genoino was exiled and the Neapolitan Republic proclaimed.
