= John Joseph of Austria =

Spanish general and political figure (1629–1679)

Don John Joseph of Austria
- Juan José de Austria
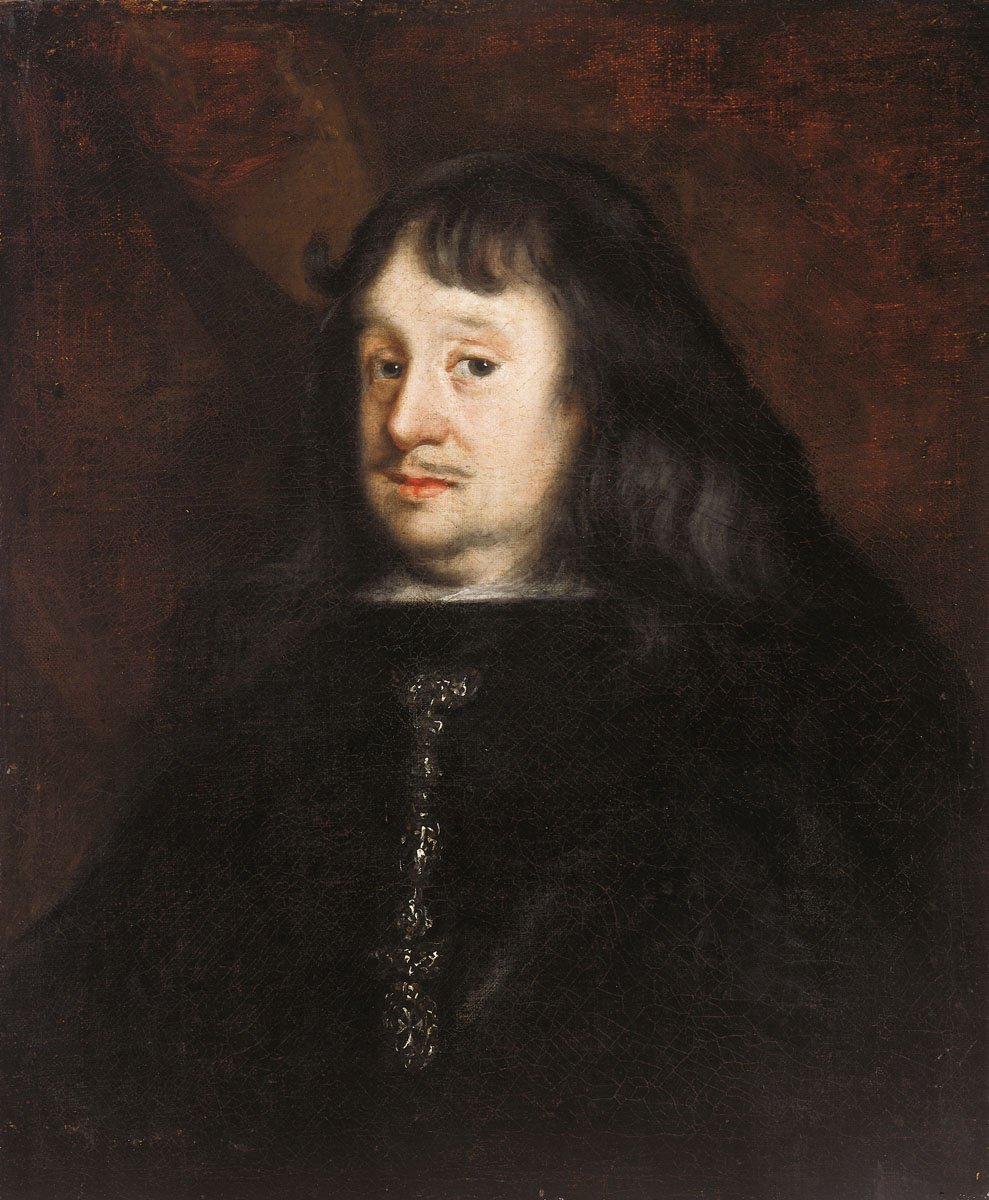

Chief Minister of Spain
- In office 23 January 1677 – 17 September 1679
- Monarch: Charles II
- Preceded by: Fernando de Valenzuela
- Succeeded by: Juan Francisco de la Cerda, 8th Duke of Medinaceli

Viceroy of Aragon
- In office 25 February 1669 – 1678
- Monarch: Charles II
- Preceded by: Pedro Pablo Jiménez de Urrea
- Succeeded by: Lorenzo Onofre Colonna

Governor of Extremadura
- In office 1661–1664
- Monarch: Philip IV
- Preceded by: Francisco de Tutavilla y del Rufo, Duque de San Germán
- Succeeded by: Luis de Benavides Carrillo, Marquis of Caracena

Governor-General of the Spanish Netherlands
- In office 11 May 1656 – May 1659
- Monarch: Philip IV
- Valido: Luis de Haro
- Preceded by: Leopold Wilhelm of Austria
- Succeeded by: Luis de Benavides Carrillo

Viceroy of Catalonia
- In office 23 January 1653 – 4 March 1656
- Monarch: Philip IV
- Preceded by: Francisco de Orozco, 2nd Marquis of Mortara
- Succeeded by: Francisco de Orozco

Viceroy of Sicily
- In office 27 December 1648 – 1651
- Monarch: Philip IV
- Preceded by: Luis Francisco Núñez de Guzmán (as President of the Kingdom)
- Succeeded by: Melchor Centelles de Borgia (as interim)

Viceroy of Naples
- In office 19 January – 2 March 1648
- Monarch: Philip IV
- Preceded by: Rodrigo Ponce de León
- Succeeded by: Íñigo Vélez de Guevara, 8th Count of Oñate

Personal details
- Born: 7 April 1629 Madrid, Habsburg Spain
- Died: 17 September 1679 (aged 50) Madrid, Habsburg Spain
- Resting place: Pantheon of the Infants
- Domestic partner: Rosa Azzolino
- Relations: Maria Theresa, Margaret Theresa (sisters); Charles II; Baltasar Charles; Philip Prospero (brothers)
- Children: Margaret de Austria; Catherine; Ana María Juana Ambrosia Vicenta
- Parent(s): Philip IV of Spain; María Calderón
- Occupation: Military officer and politician

Military service
- Allegiance: (Spain) Spanish Empire
- Branch/service: Tercios
- Years of service: 1645–1679
- Rank: General
- Battles/wars: Franco-Spanish War (1635–1659): Siege of Barcelona (1651); Battle of Valenciennes (1656); Battle of the Dunes (1658); Portuguese Restoration War: Battle of Ameixial (1663); Battle of Castelo Rodrigo

John Joseph of Austria (Spanish: Don Juan José de Austria; 7 April 1629 – 17 September 1679), also called John the Younger was a Spanish general and political figure. He was the only illegitimate son of Philip IV of Spain to be acknowledged by the King and trained for military command and political administration.

Don John advanced the causes of the Spanish Crown militarily and diplomatically during the century's crisis, recovering control of Naples, Sicily and Catalonia from local revolts, although failing to advance from only initial victories against France and England in his stint as governor of the Spanish Netherlands from 1656 to 1659. He then failed to quell the revolt of Portugal, which separated from Spain.

After his military career, he returned to the court, where his opposition his father's widow, Queen Mariana of Austria, led to a 1677 palace coup through which he exiled Mariana and took control of the monarchy over his young half-brother Charles II of Spain. Don John worked to secure Charles II's international position against the ambitions of Louis XIV of France, although his labour was left unfinished with his death in 1679.

== Early life ==
Coat of arms of John of Austria the Younger

His mother was María "La Calderona" Calderón, a popular actress, who was forced into a convent shortly after his birth. He was raised in León by a woman of modest circumstances who likely did not know his parentage, though he received "a careful education" at Ocaña (Kingdom of Toledo). In 1642, the King recognized him officially as his son, creating him a prince (Serenity) and John began his life's career as a military representative of his father's interests.

== Military career ==
Don John was sent in 1647 to Naples, then in the throes of the popular rising first led by Masaniello, with a naval squadron and a military force, to support the viceroy. He ordered his land and sea forces to blockade the rebel held city while Rodrigo Ponce de León, 4th Duke of Arcos inserted agents. Don John waited until the exhaustion of the insurgents and the follies of their French leader, Henry II, Duke of Guise allowed him to move in and crush the remains of the revolt and drive out the, by then, despised French.

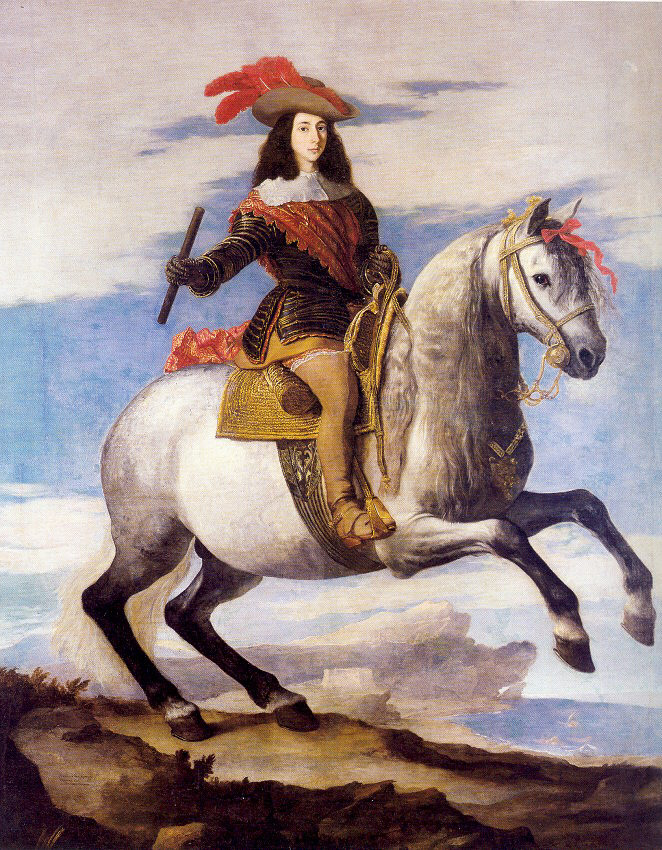
The young Don John as general of the Spanish army by Jusepe de Ribera

He was next sent as viceroy to Sicily, whence he was recalled in 1651 to complete the pacification of the Principality of Catalonia, which had been in revolt since 1640. On the way to Catalonia to assume his position, he captured the French galleon Lion Couronné, with a squadron of galleys he had under his command. The high-handedness of the French, whom the Catalans had called in to help their revolt, had produced a reaction, and many switched their loyalties back to the Spanish King. By the time Don John assumed command, most of Catalonia had been recovered and he had not much more to do than to preside over the final siege of Barcelona and the convention which terminated the revolt in October 1652.

On both occasions, he played the peacemaker, and this sympathetic part, combined with his own pleasant manners, engaging personality, and a handsome person with bright eyes made him a popular royal favourite. In 1656, he was sent to command in Flanders, then in revolt against his own sovereign. At the storming of the French camp at Battle of Valenciennes in 1656, Don Juan Jose displayed great personal courage at the head of a brilliantly executed cavalry charge that caught the French totally by surprise. When, however, he took a part in the leadership of the army at the Battle of the Dunes, fought against the French under Turenne and the British forces sent by Oliver Cromwell, he was decisively defeated and failed to raise the Siege of Dunkirk, in spite of the efforts of Louis, Grand Condé, whose invaluable advice he neglected, and the stubborn fight put up by his own troops.

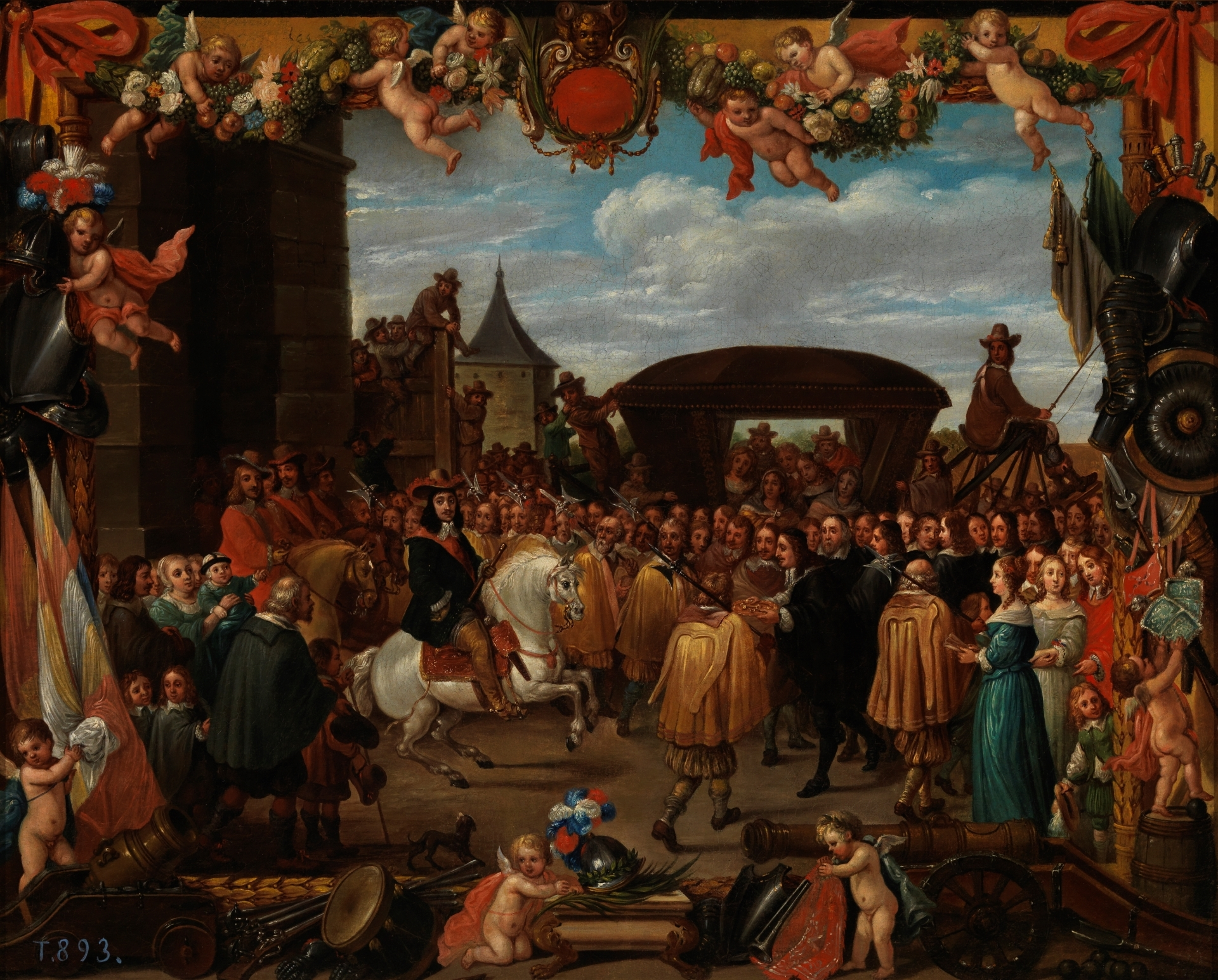
Triumphal entry of Don John into the Southern Netherlands, attributed to David Teniers III

During 1661 and 1662, he fought against the Portuguese in Extremadura. The Spanish troops were ill-supplied and irregularly paid and in a rugged, hostile country. Morale was poor and they were untrustworthy but they were superior in numbers and some successes were gained. If Don John had not suffered from the indolence which Edward Hyde, 1st Earl of Clarendon considered his chief defect, the Portuguese might have been hard-pressed. John's forces overran the greater part of southern Portugal, but in 1663, with the Portuguese forces reinforced by a body of English troops, and put under the command of the Huguenot Frederick Schomberg, 1st Duke of Schomberg, Don John was completely beaten at Ameixial.

Even so, he might not have lost the confidence of his father, if Queen Mariana, mother of the sickly Prince of Asturias Charles, the only surviving legitimate son of the King, had not regarded him with distrust and dislike. Don John was removed from command and sent to his estate at Consuegra.

== Opposition to Queen Mariana of Spain ==
After the death of Philip IV in 1665, Don John became the recognized leader of the opposition to the government of Philip's widow, the regent. She and her favourite, the German Jesuit Juan Everardo Nithard, seized and put to death one of his most trusted servants, Don Jose Malladas.

Don John, in return, put himself at the head of a rising of Aragon and Catalonia, which led to the expulsion of Nithard on 25 February 1669. Don John was, however, forced to content himself with the viceroyalty of Aragon. In 1677, the queen mother aroused universal opposition by her favour for Fernando de Valenzuela. Don John was able to drive her from court and establish himself as prime minister. Great hopes were entertained for his administration, but it proved disappointing and short; Don John died, perhaps by poison, on 17 September 1679.

== Popish Plot ==
His name featured prominently in the Popish Plot fabricated by the notorious informer Titus Oates in England in 1678. Oates unwisely claimed to have met Don John in Madrid; when questioned closely by Charles II of England, who had met Don John in Brussels in 1656, it became clear that Oates had no idea what he looked like, confirming the King's suspicion that the Plot was an invention.

== Ancestry ==
Ancestors of John Joseph of Austria

8. Philip II of Spain
4. Philip III of Spain
9. Anna of Austria (1549-1580)
2. Philip IV of Spain
10. Charles II, Archduke of Inner Austria
5. Margaret of Austria
11. Maria Anna of Bavaria (1551-1608)
1. John of Austria the Younger
3. María Calderón
