= Duke of Arcos =

Hereditary title in the Peerage of Spain

Dukedom of Arcos
- Creation date: 20 January 1493
- Created by: Isabella I
- Peerage: Peerage of Spain
- First holder: Rodrigo Ponce de León, 1st Duke of Arcos
- Present holder: María Cristina de Ulloa y Ponce de León, 18th Duchess of Arcos

Duke of Arcos (Spanish: Duque de Arcos) is an hereditary title in the Peerage of Spain, granted by Isabella I in 1493 to Rodrigo Ponce de León, then 4th Count of Arcos. The dukedom is among the first 25 titles which reached the rank of Grandee of Spain 1st Class, in 1520. Nowadays however, all Grandees are of the same class.

The title makes reference to the town of Arcos de la Frontera in Cádiz.

The 4th Duke of Arcos was a character in the opera called Salvator Rosa (1874) by Antônio Carlos Gomes.

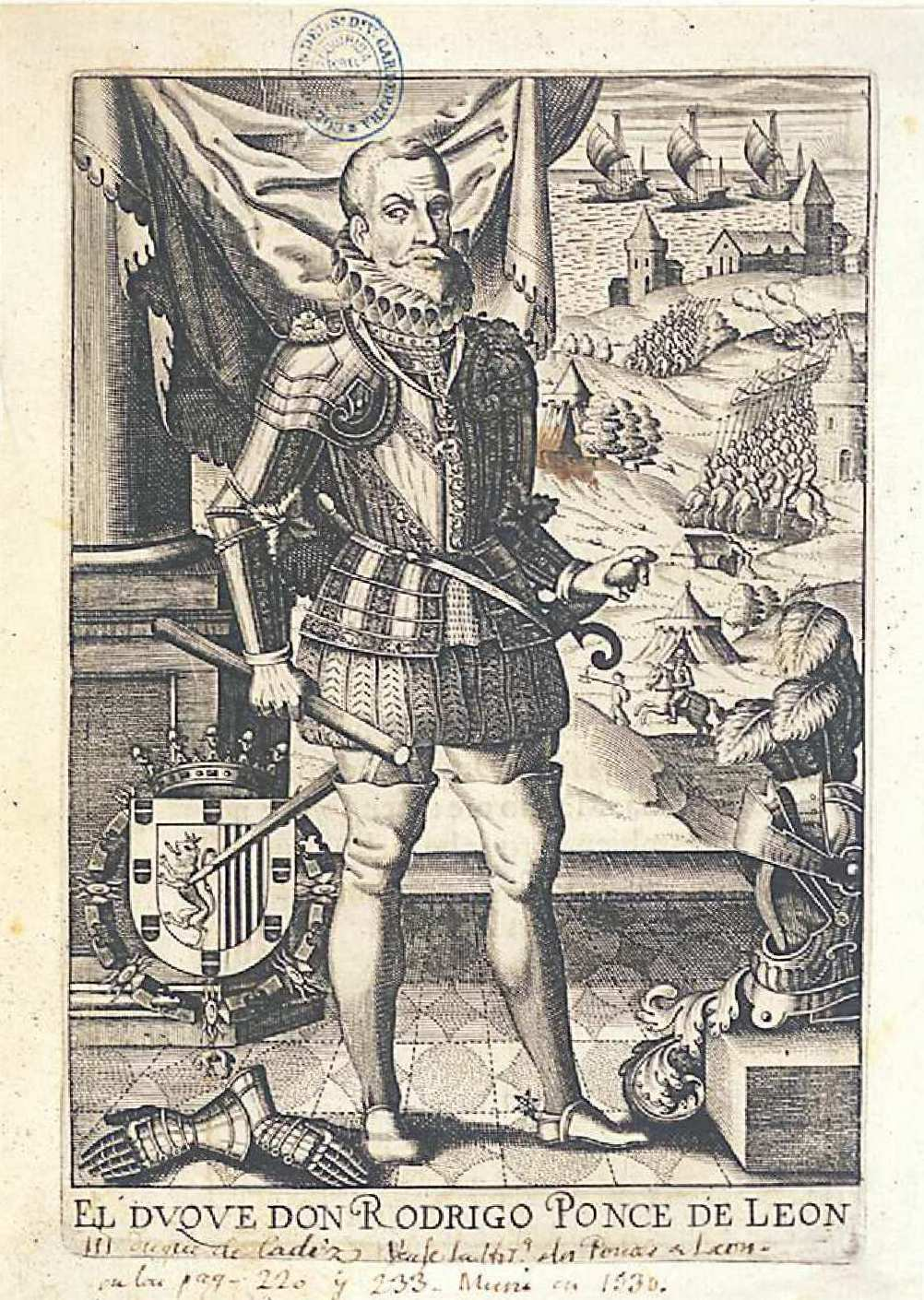
1620 Lithograph of the 1st Duke of Arcos, Biblioteca Nacional

== Counts of Arcos (1431) ==
- Pedro Ponce de León, 1st Count of Arcos
- Juan Pérez Ponce de León, 2nd Count of Arcos
- Rodrigo Ponce de León, 3rd Count of Arcos
- Francisca Ponce de León, 4th Countess of Arcos:
- Rodrigo Ponce de León, 5th Count of Arcos (1488–1493). 1st Duke of Arcos (since 1493)

== Dukes of Arcos (1493) ==
- Rodrigo Ponce de León, 1st Duke of Arcos (1493–1530)
- Luis Ponce de León, 2nd Duke of Arcos (1512–1573)
- Rodrigo Ponce de León, 3rd Duke of Arcos (1534–1630)
- Rodrigo Ponce de León, 4th Duke of Arcos (1602–1658)
- Francisco Ponce de León, 5th Duke of Arcos (1632–1673)
- Manuel Ponce de León, 6th Duke of Arcos (1633–1693)
- Joaquín Ponce de León, 7th Duke of Arcos (1665–1729)
- Joaquín Ponce de León y Spínola, 8th Duke of Arcos (1718–1743)
- Manuel Ponce de León, 9th Duke of Arcos (1720–1744)
- Francisco Ponce de León, 10th Duke of Arcos (1723–1763)
- Antonio Ponce de León, 11th Duke of Arcos (1726–1780)
- María Josefa Pimentel, 12th Duchess of Arcos (1750–1835)
- Pedro Téllez-Girón, 13th Duke of Arcos (1810–1844)
- Mariano Téllez-Girón, 14th Duke of Arcos (1814–1882)
- José Brunetti, 15th Duke of Arcos (1839–1928)
- Ángela María Téllez-Girón, 16th Duchess of Arcos (b. 1925)
- Ángela María de Solís-Beaumont, 17th Duchess of Arcos (1950-2016)
- Cristina de Ulloa y Solís-Beaumont, 18th Duchess of Arcos (b.1980)

== See also ==
- List of dukes in the peerage of Spain
- List of current grandees of Spain
