= Charles FitzCharles, 1st Earl of Plymouth =

Illegitimate son of Charles II of England

The Right Honourable The Earl of Plymouth
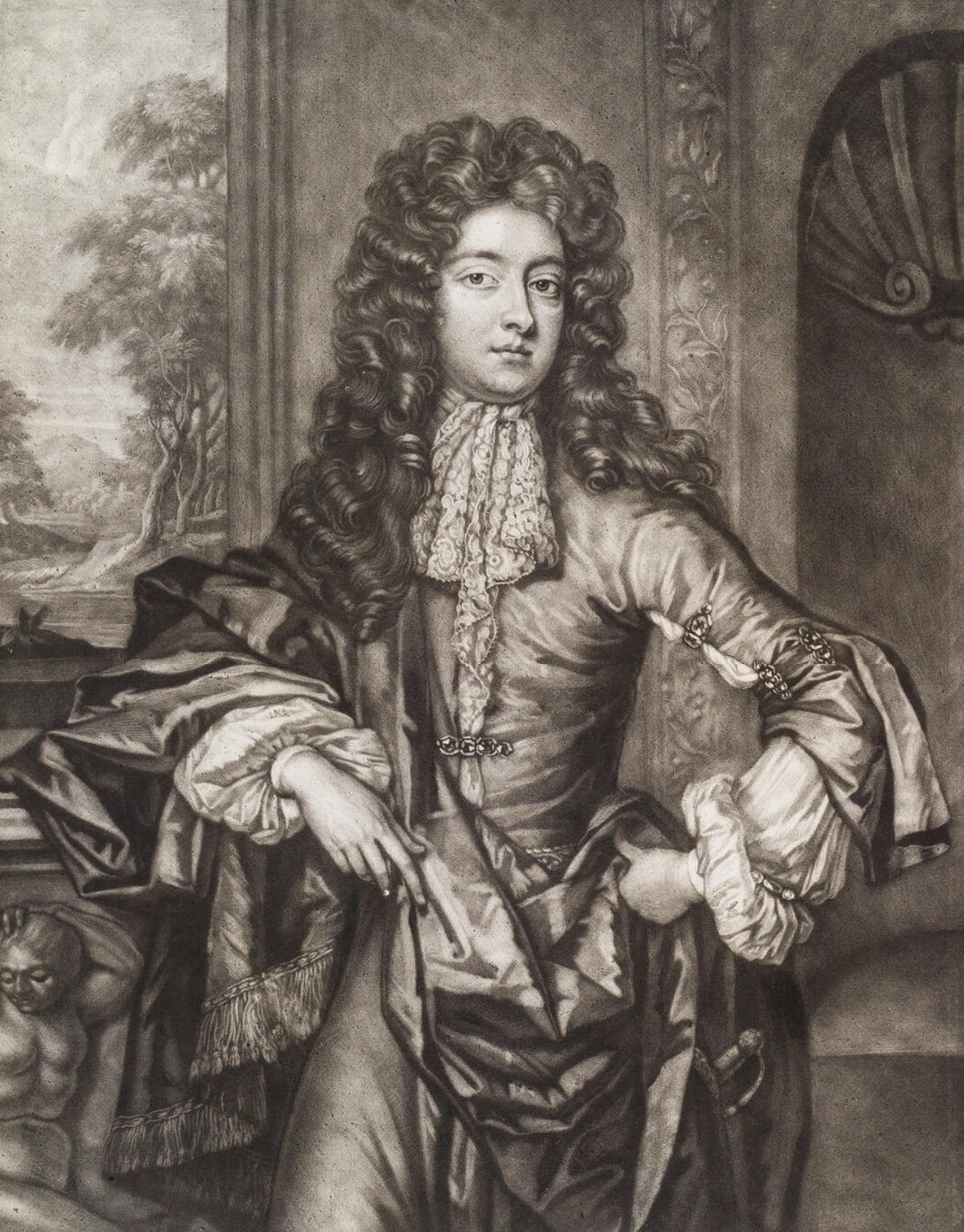
- Portrait by John Smith, c. 1689
- Born: c. 1657; Westminster, England
- Died: 17 October 1680 (aged 23); Colony of Tangier
- Burial place: Westminster Abbey
- Spouse: Lady Bridget Osborne
- Parents: Charles II of England; Catherine Pegge

Arms of Charles FitzCharles, 1st Earl of Plymouth: The royal arms of King Charles II overall a baton sinister vair

Charles FitzCharles, 1st Earl of Plymouth (c. 1657 – 17 October 1680), was the illegitimate son of King Charles II of England and Catherine Pegge. He had a sister, Catherine, who is believed to have become a nun. His mother went on to marry Sir Edward Greene of Samford in Essex, and had one child, Justinia Greene. His subsidiary titles were Viscount Totness and Baron Dartmouth.

Plymouth died while serving as part of the Tangier Garrison.

== Life ==
Charles FitzCharles was born in or about 1657. He was the illegitimate son of Charles II of England, by Catherine Pegge, daughter of Thomas Pegge of Yeldersley, Derbyshire. Charles II had the affair with Catherine (or Katherine) Pegge whilst he was abroad in exile. Charles the younger was allowed to use the Royal arms with a "baton sinister, Vaire ... and was bred to the sea". He was educated abroad, probably in Spain and he was known by the nickname of "Don Carlos".

Sir William Dugdale wrote, giving much testimony of his singular accomplishments:

In the time of his youth, he was elevated to the peerage, 28 July 1675, as Baron of Dartmouth, Viscount Totness, and Earl of Plymouth, to the end he might be the more encouraged to persist in the paths of virtue, and thereby be the better fitted for the managery of great affairs when he should attain to riper years.

He married on 19 September 1678 at St Mary's Church, Wimbledon, Surrey, Lady Bridget Osborne, third daughter of Thomas Osborne, 1st Duke of Leeds, Lord High Treasurer.

He was a friend of the dramatic poet, Thomas Otway, for whom he procured a cornet's commission in a regiment of horse serving in Flanders. Later when his friend, John Sheffield, 1st Duke of Buckingham and Normanby in consequence of his attachment to Queen Anne, then Princess of Denmark, was sent to the Colony of Tangier, it was reported that the Duke was purposely despatched in a leaky vessel in order to get rid of him. Nevertheless, the Earl of Plymouth, notwithstanding he was sensible of the danger, insisted on accompanying him.

== Death ==
The Sultan Moulay Ismail of Morocco had made an unsuccessful attempt to seize the town of Tangier in 1679, but ended up imposing a crippling blockade. The King's Own Royal Regiment was formed on 13 July 1680 as the 2nd Tangier, or Earl of Plymouth's Regiment of Foot, with Charles as the founding Colonel. Charles died of dysentery without issue on 17 October 1680, aged 23, and the English were ultimately forced to withdraw, ending their presence in Tangier. The title of Earl of Plymouth became extinct, but it was recreated two years later for Thomas Hickman-Windsor, 7th Baron Windsor (1627–1687).

Plymouth's body was returned to England and he was buried on 18 January 1681 in Westminster Abbey. His wife, the Countess, remarried in 1706, Philip Bisse, Bishop of Hereford, and she died on 9 May 1718. Bridget left the Bishop a widower and he erected a handsome tablet in her honour in Hereford Cathedral.

Military offices
Preceded by Thomas Butler, 6th Earl of Ossory	Governor of Tangier; 1680–1680	Succeeded by Sir Edward Sackville
Preceded by Regiment raised	Colonel of the 2nd Tangier Regiment; 1680	Succeeded by Percy Kirke
Peerage of England
New creation	Earl of Plymouth; 1675–1680	Extinct
