= Catherine Pegge =

Mistress of Charles II of England

- Born: c. 1635
- Known for: Mistress of Charles II of England
- Spouse: Sir Edward Greene (m. 1660; died 1676)
- Children: Justinia Greene; Illegitimate: Charles FitzCharles, 1st Earl of Plymouth; Catherine FitzCharles
- Parents: Thomas Pegge; Catherine Kniveton

Catherine Pegge (born c. 1635) was a long-term mistress of Charles II of England. She had two children by him, Charles FitzCharles, 1st Earl of Plymouth, and Catherine FitzCharles.

Pegge Family Arms.

== Background ==
Catherine was the daughter of Thomas Pegge of Yeldersley, Ashbourne, Derbyshire, and his wife, Catherine Kniveton, daughter of Sir Gilbert Kniveton, Baronet, and wife. Thomas and his family were exiled to Bruges during the English Civil War following his capture serving under the Royalist Colonel General Henry Hastings, 1st Baron Loughborough.

The Yeldersley branch descended from Thomas Pegge.

== Royal mistress ==
It was during her family's exile in Bruges that Catherine's liaison with Charles II began, resulting in the birth of her son in 1657. Catherine had two children by Charles II:

- Charles FitzCharles, 1st Earl of Plymouth
- Catherine FitzCharles

There are allegedly two portraits of Catherine Pegge by Sir Peter Lely, the whereabouts of which are unknown. She was said to have great beauty.

== Marriage ==
Catherine married Sir Edward Greene of Sampford in Essex, Baronet, on 26 July 1660. The couple had a daughter, Justinia Greene (1667–1717), one of "the English Benedictine Ladies" of Pontoise, France. Sir Edward Greene died at Flanders in 1676 and was interred at Sampford, Essex.
