= Listed buildings in Yeldersley =

Yeldersley is a civil parish in the Derbyshire Dales district of Derbyshire, England. The parish contains 14 listed buildings that are recorded in the National Heritage List for England. All the listed buildings are designated at Grade II, the lowest of the three grades, which is applied to "buildings of national importance and special interest". The parish is almost entirely rural, with no substantial settlements, and the listed buildings consist of houses, cottages and associated structures, farmhouses and farm buildings, and a milepost.

== Buildings ==
Name and location	Photograph	Date	Notes
Keeper's Cottage; 52.99076°N 1.68801°W	—	17th century (possible)	The cottage, which was remodelled in the 19th century, is rendered, with sandstone dressings and a thatched roof. There is a single storey with an attic. The doorway has a bracketed stone hood, and the windows are casements with hood moulds.
Mill Dam Farmhouse and cottage 53.00375°N 1.67013°W	—	17th century	The building, which was later refashioned, is in red brick with a tile roof. It is partly in two storeys, and partly in a single storey with an attic. The house has a blocked central doorway, a later doorway inserted to the left, and sliding sash windows. The cottage has a doorway with a segmental-arched head, blocked with a window inserted, to its left is a casement window with a segmental arch, and above is an eyebrow dormer with a sliding sash window.
Thatched Cottage; 52.99821°N 1.70108°W	—	17th century	The cottage has a timber framed core, it is largely encased in brick, and it has a thatched roof. There is a single storey and two bays. On the front is an off-centre doorway and a blocked doorway, two casement windows, and a blocked eyebrow dormer. In the west gable end is a cruck truss.
Old Hall Farmhouse and barn 53.00152°N 1.67380°W	—	Mid 18th century	The farmhouse and attached barn are in red brick, the house pebbledashed, and they have a continuous tile roof with stone coped gables and moulded kneelers. There are two storeys, and the house has three bays, the middle bay gabled. In the centre is a gabled porch, the windows are casements and in the gable is a half-dormer. On the gable end are windows, including a semicircular window in the gable, all with moulded keystones. The openings in the barn on the left have segmental heads, including a cart entrance, a doorway and windows.
Osmaston Park Farmhouse; 52.98998°N 1.68695°W	—	Mid 18th century	The farmhouse is in red brick, partly rendered, with stone dressings, a dentilled eaves band, and a tile roof with rounded stone coped gables and moulded kneelers. There are two storeys and an attic, a symmetrical front of three bays, and a rear outshut. The central doorway and the windows, which are casements, have cambered brick lintels and stone keystones.
Barn southwest of Yeldersley Old Hall; 53.00133°N 1.67426°W	—	Mid 18th century	The barn, which has been converted for residential use, is in red brick with stone dressings, a moulded eaves cornice, and a tile roof with stone coped gables and moulded kneelers. There are two storeys and six bays. The west front contains sash windows with flat heads, brick voussoirs and stone keystones, and there is a blocked doorway with a segmental head. The openings in the south gable end are blocked, including a circular window in the gable, and on the east front the windows have segmental heads.
Barn, The Firs Farm; 53.00363°N 1.68233°W	—	Late 18th century	The barn is mainly in brick, the lower part in stone, and has tile roofs. It is in one and two storeys, and has an L-shaped plan, with a north range over 200 feet (61 m) long. On the north front are two later outshuts with catslide roofs, openings with segmental heads, and tiers of slit vents.
Yeldersley Hall; 52.99321°N 1.68969°W		c. 1800	A country house that was extended in about 1910. It is in brick, mainly rendered, with stone dressings, a floor band, a moulded cornice, a shallow parapet, and hipped Welsh slate roofs. There are two storeys and an L-shaped plan. The southeast front has twelve bays, the left five bays projecting, with a central doorway, and sash windows with wedge lintels and keystones. At the rear is a three-storey north wing with segmental-headed casement windows. The entrance porch and a bay window were added in about 1910.
Milepost; 52.98890°N 1.68601°W		Early 19th century	The milepost is on the west side of Painter's Lane (A52 road). It is in cast iron with a triangular plan, and has a sloping upper part, rising to a back plate with a curved top. On the top are inscribed the distances to London and Buxton, below which is the name of the township. On the sides are the distances to Ashbourne and Derby, and details of the manufacturer.
Stable block, Yeldersley Hall; 52.99353°N 1.68960°W	—	Early 19th century	The stable block is in red brick with tile roofs, two storeys, and three ranges around a courtyard. The main range has a central projecting bay with a string course, and a pedimented gable containing a clock. The openings have segmental or semicircular heads, and there are four dormers with mansard roofs containing casements. The left range contains a dormer, and windows and a carriage arch with segmental heads, and in the right range are garages with lofts above.
The Lodge, Yeldersley Hall; 52.99302°N 1.69136°W	—	c. 1830–40	The lodge at the entrance to the drive is in sandstone with a moulded eaves cornice, and a hipped slate roof. There is a single storey and three bays. The doorway has a flat bracketed hood, and the windows are sashes set in recesses extending to the ground.
Yeldersley Hollies and outbuilding 52.99083°N 1.65764°W	—	1840	The farmhouse and attached outbuilding are in red brick, and have a tile roof with stone coped gables and moulded kneelers, and two storeys. The house to the east has a dentilled cornice, and a symmetrical front of three bays, the middle bay projecting and gabled. On the front are decorative panels, and a porch with a Tudor arched opening and a chamfered surround, above which is a date plaque. The windows are casements with chamfered surrounds and iron frames. The outbuilding contains a doorway and segmental-arched windows.
East Lodge and gate piers, Osmaston Manor; 52.98721°N 1.68326°W		c. 1848	The lodge, designed by H. I. Stevens, is in limestone with gritstone dressings, a floor band, and a stone slate roof with a deep overhang on wooden brackets. There are two storeys and a T-shaped plan, with a front of two bays, the left bay projecting. The windows are recessed, chamfered and mullioned. Attached to the southeast is a wall containing gate piers with moulded caps.
Dog Kennels, Yeldersley Hall; 52.99378°N 1.68906°W	—	Early 20th century	The dog kennels are in red brick with a tile roof, and have a single storey with an overloft. There is a gabled central bay, flanked by two bays on each side. The central bay contains a doorway with a dovecote above, and in each outer bay is a round-arched kennel opening with imposts and a keystone, and a rectangular window above. In front of the kennels are open pens enclosed by low walls with railings.
