= Charles II of England =

King of England, Scotland, and Ireland from 1660 to 1685

Charles II
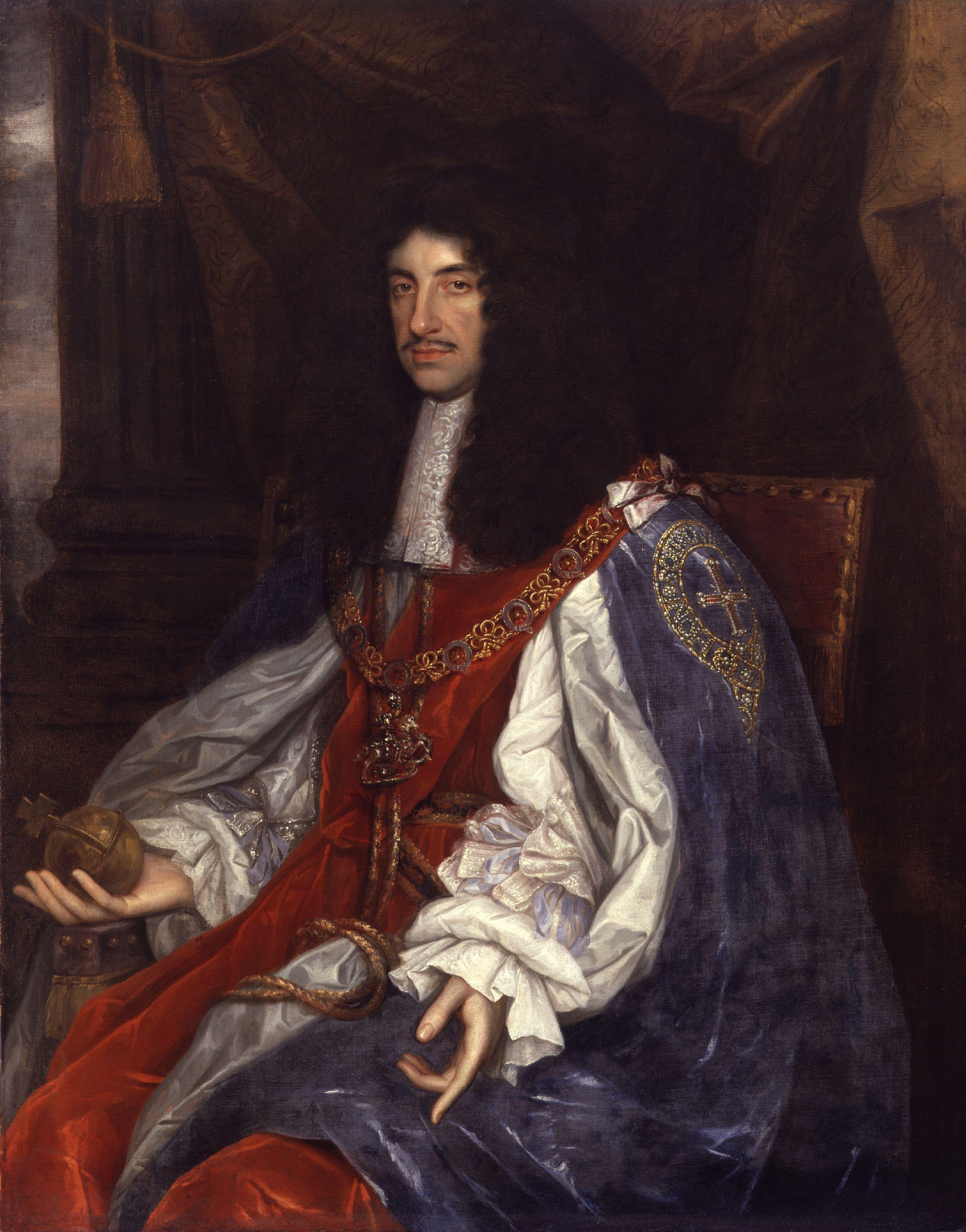
- Portrait, c. 1660–1665

King of England, Scotland, and Ireland
- Reign: 29 May 1660 (Note: The traditional date of the Restoration marking the first assembly of King and Parliament together since the abolition of the English monarchy in 1649. The English Parliament recognised Charles as king by unanimous vote on 2 May 1660, and he was proclaimed king in London on 8 May, although royalists had recognised him as such since the execution of his father on 30 January 1649. During Charles's reign all legal documents stating a regnal year did so as if his reign began at his father's death.) – 6 February 1685
- Coronation: 23 April 1661
- Predecessor: Charles I (de jure); Council of State (de facto)
- Successor: James II & VII

King of Scotland
- Reign: 30 January 1649 – 3 September 1651 (Note: From the death of his father to his defeat at the Battle of Worcester)
- Coronation: 1 January 1651
- Predecessor: Charles I
- Successor: Military government
- Born: 29 May 1630 (N.S.: 8 June 1630); St James's Palace, Westminster, England
- Died: 6 February 1685 (aged 54) (N.S.: 16 February 1685); Whitehall Palace, Westminster, England
- Burial: 14 February 1685; Westminster Abbey, England
- Spouse: Catherine of Braganza (m. 1662)
- Illegitimate children Detail: James Scott, Duke of Monmouth; Charlotte Paston, Countess of Yarmouth; Charles FitzCharles, 1st Earl of Plymouth; Catherine FitzCharles; Charles FitzRoy, 2nd Duke of Cleveland; Henry FitzRoy, 1st Duke of Grafton; Charlotte Lee, Countess of Lichfield; George FitzRoy, Duke of Northumberland; Charles Beauclerk, 1st Duke of St Albans; James Beauclerk, Lord Beauclerk; Charles Lennox, 1st Duke of Richmond; Mary Tudor, Countess of Derwentwater
- House: Stuart
- Father: Charles I of England
- Mother: Henrietta Maria of France

Charles II (29 May 1630 – 6 February 1685) (Note: All dates in this article unless otherwise noted are given in the Julian calendar with the start of year adjusted to 1 January (see Old Style and New Style dates).) was King of Scotland from 1649 until 1651 and King of England, Scotland, and Ireland from the 1660 Restoration of the monarchy until his death in 1685.

Charles II was the oldest surviving child of Charles I of England, Scotland and Ireland and Henrietta Maria of France. After Charles I's execution at Whitehall on 30 January 1649, at the climax of the English Civil War, the Parliament of Scotland proclaimed Charles II king on 5 February 1649. However, England entered the period known as the English Interregnum or the English Commonwealth with a republican government eventually led by Oliver Cromwell. Cromwell defeated Charles II at the Battle of Worcester on 3 September 1651, and Charles fled to mainland Europe. Cromwell became Lord Protector of England, Scotland and Ireland. Charles spent the next nine years in exile in France, the Dutch Republic and the Spanish Netherlands. A political crisis after Cromwell's death in 1658 resulted in the restoration of the monarchy in 1660, and Charles was invited to return to Britain. On 29 May 1660, his 30th birthday, he was received in London to public acclaim.

Charles's English Parliament enacted the Clarendon Code, to shore up the position of the re-established Church of England. Charles acquiesced to these new laws even though he favoured a policy of religious tolerance. The major foreign policy issue of his early reign was the Second Anglo-Dutch War. In 1670, he entered into the Treaty of Dover, an alliance with his cousin, King Louis XIV of France. Louis agreed to aid him in the Third Anglo-Dutch War and pay him a pension, and Charles secretly promised to convert to Catholicism at an unspecified future date. Charles attempted to introduce religious freedom for Catholics and Protestant dissenters with his 1672 Royal Declaration of Indulgence, but the English Parliament forced him to withdraw it. In 1679, Titus Oates's fabrication of a supposed Popish Plot sparked the Exclusion Crisis when it was revealed that Charles's brother and heir presumptive, James, Duke of York, had become a Catholic. The crisis saw the birth of the pro-exclusion Whig and anti-exclusion Tory parties. Charles sided with the Tories and, after the discovery of the Rye House Plot to murder Charles and James in 1683, some Whig leaders were executed or forced into exile. Charles dissolved the English Parliament in 1681 and ruled alone until his death in 1685.

A patron of the arts and sciences, Charles became known for his affability and friendliness, and for allowing his subjects easy access to his person. But he also showed an almost impenetrable reserve, especially concerning his political agendas. His court gained a reputation for moral laxity. Charles's marriage to Catherine of Braganza produced no surviving children, but the king acknowledged at least 12 illegitimate children by various mistresses. He was succeeded by his brother James.

== Early life, civil war and exile ==
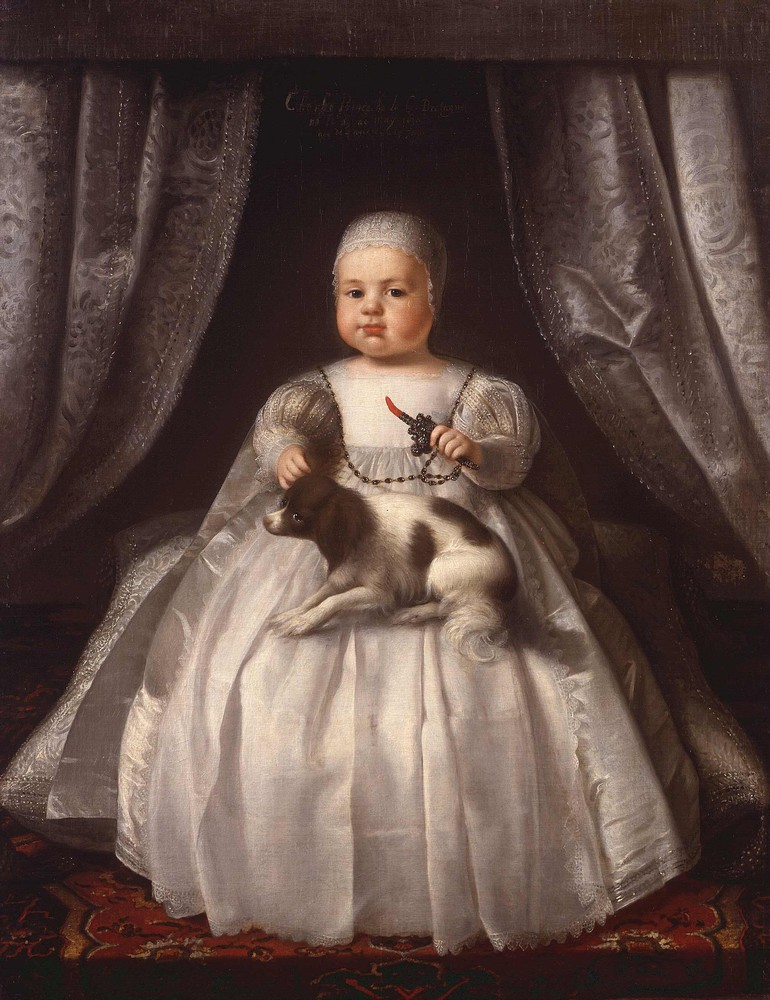
Charles as an infant in 1630, painting attributed to Justus van Egmont

Charles was born on 29 May 1630 at St James's Palace. He was the eldest surviving son of Charles I, king of England, Scotland and Ireland, and his wife Henrietta Maria of France, sister of King Louis XIII. Charles was their second child (the first being a son born about a year before, who had died within a day). He was baptised on 27 June in the Chapel Royal by William Laud, a future archbishop of Canterbury, and during his infancy was supervised by the Protestant Countess of Dorset. His godparents included his maternal uncle Louis XIII and maternal grandmother, Marie de' Medici, the Dowager Queen of France, both of whom were Catholics. At birth, Charles automatically became Duke of Cornwall and Duke of Rothesay, and the possessor of several other associated titles. At or around his eighth birthday, he was designated Prince of Wales, though he was never formally invested.

In August 1642, the long-running dispute between Charles I and Parliament culminated in the outbreak of the First English Civil War. In October, Prince Charles and his younger brother James were present at the Battle of Edgehill and spent the next two years based in the Royalist capital of Oxford. In January 1645, Charles was given his own Council and made titular head of Royalist forces in the West Country. By spring 1646, most of the region had been occupied by Parliamentarian forces and Charles went into exile to avoid capture. From Falmouth, he went first to the Isles of Scilly, then to Jersey, and finally to France, where his mother was already living under the protection of his first cousin, the eight-year-old Louis XIV. Charles I surrendered into captivity in May 1646.

During the Second English Civil War in 1648, Charles moved to The Hague, where his sister Mary and his brother-in-law William II, Prince of Orange, seemed more likely to provide substantial aid to the Royalist cause than his mother's French relations. Although part of the Parliamentarian fleet defected, it did not reach Scotland in time to join up with the Royalist Engager army led by the Duke of Hamilton before it was defeated at Preston by the New Model Army.

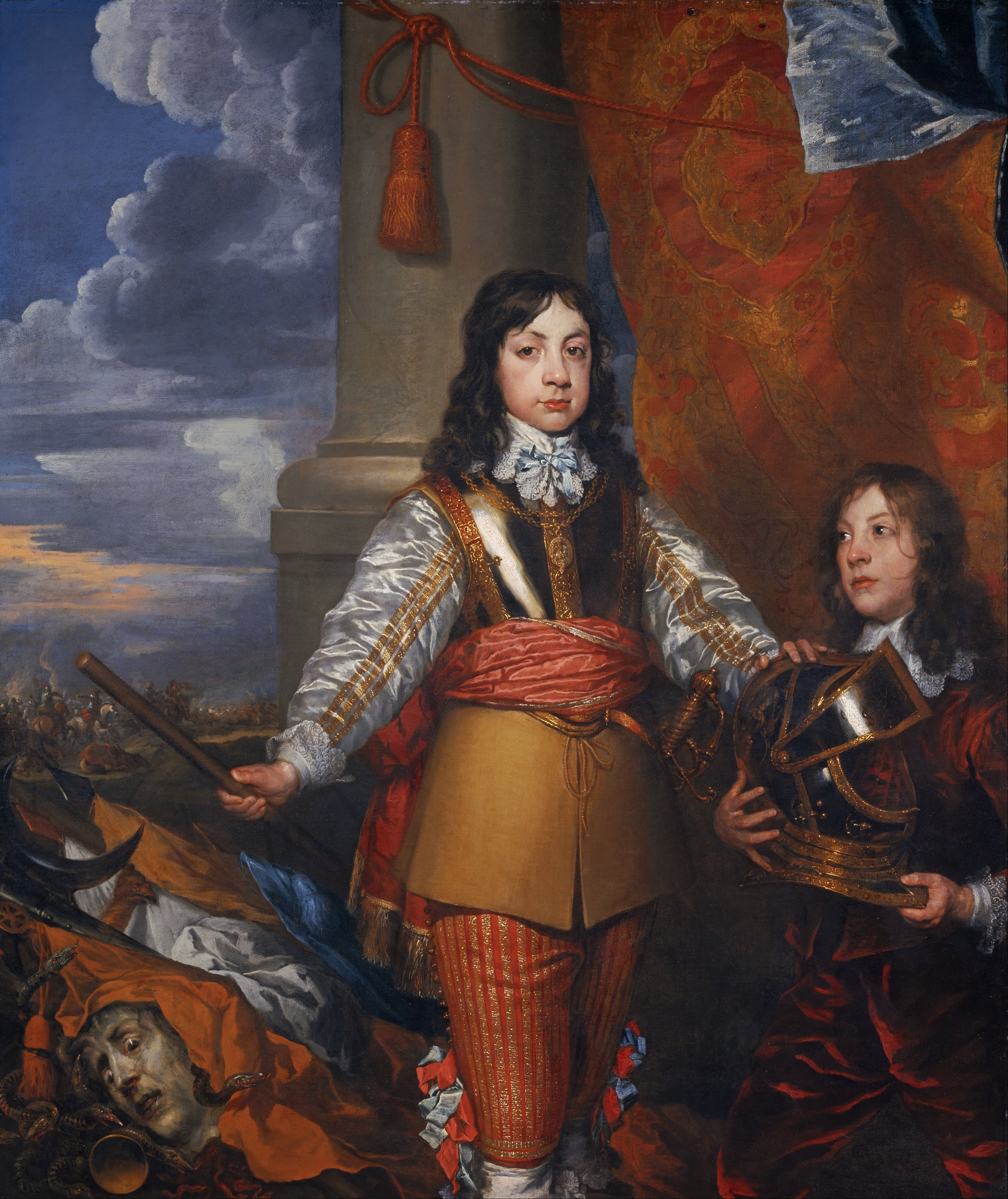
Portrait by William Dobson, c. 1642 or 1643

At The Hague, Charles had a brief affair with Lucy Walter, who later falsely claimed that they had secretly married. Her son, James Crofts (afterwards Duke of Monmouth and Duke of Buccleuch), was one of Charles's many illegitimate children who became prominent in British society. Despite his son's diplomatic efforts to save him, Charles I was executed in January 1649, and England became a republic. On 5 February, the Covenanter Parliament of Scotland proclaimed Charles II as "King of Great Britain, France and Ireland" at the Mercat Cross, Edinburgh, but refused to allow him to enter Scotland unless he agreed to establish Presbyterianism as the state religion in all three of his kingdoms.

When negotiations with the Scots stalled, Charles authorised Lord Montrose to land in the Orkney Islands with a small army to threaten the Scots with invasion, in the hope of forcing an agreement more to his liking. Montrose feared that Charles would accept a compromise, and so chose to invade mainland Scotland anyway. He was captured and executed. Charles reluctantly promised that he would abide by the terms of a treaty agreed between him and the Scots Parliament at Breda, and support the Solemn League and Covenant, which authorised Presbyterian church governance across Britain. Upon his arrival in Scotland on 23 June 1650, he formally agreed to the Covenant; his abandonment of Episcopal church governance, although winning him support in Scotland, left him unpopular in England. Charles himself soon came to despise the "villainy" and "hypocrisy" of the Covenanters. Charles was provided with a Scottish court, and the record of his food and household expenses at Falkland Palace and Perth survives.

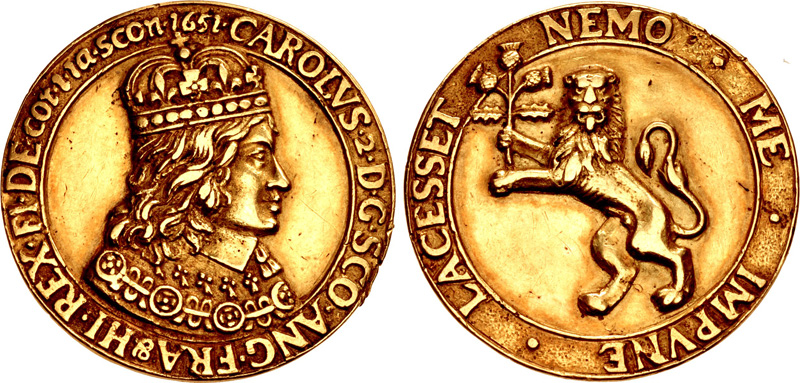
Cast gold coronation medal of Charles II, dated 1651

Charles's alliance with the Scots led to the Anglo-Scottish War of 1650 to 1652. On 3 September 1650, the Covenanters were defeated at Dunbar by a much smaller force commanded by Oliver Cromwell. The Scots were divided between moderate Engagers and the more radical Kirk Party, who even fought each other. Disillusioned by these divisions, Charles rode north to join an Engager force in October, an event which became known as "the Start", but within two days members of the Kirk Party had recovered him. Nevertheless, the Scots remained Charles's best hope of restoration, and he was crowned King of Scotland at Scone Abbey on 1 January 1651. With Cromwell's forces threatening Charles's position in Scotland, it was decided to mount an attack on England, but many of their most experienced soldiers had been excluded on religious grounds by the Kirk Party, whose leaders also refused to participate, among them Lord Argyll. Opposition to what was primarily a Scottish army meant few English Royalists joined as it moved south, and the invasion ended in defeat at the Battle of Worcester on 3 September 1651. Charles managed to escape and landed in Normandy six weeks later on 16 October, even though there was a reward of £1,000 on his head, anyone caught helping him was at risk of being put to death, and he was difficult to disguise, being over 6 ft (1.8 m), which was unusually tall for the time. (Note: One thousand pounds was a vast sum at the time, greater than an average workman's lifetime earnings.)

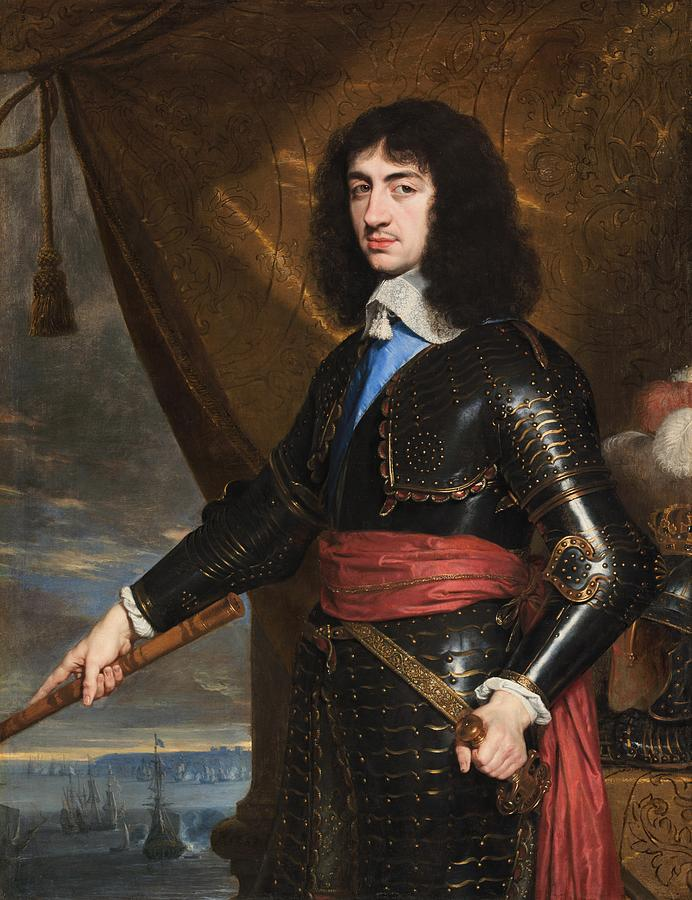
Charles in exile, painted by Philippe de Champaigne, c. 1653

Under the Instrument of Government passed by Parliament, Cromwell was appointed Lord Protector of England, Scotland and Ireland in 1653, effectively placing the British Isles under military rule. Charles lived a life of leisure at Saint-Germain-en-Laye near Paris, living on a grant from Louis XIV of 600 livres a month. Charles could not obtain sufficient finance or support to mount a serious challenge to Cromwell's government. Despite the Stuart family connections through Henrietta Maria and the Princess of Orange, France and the Dutch Republic allied themselves with Cromwell's government from 1654, forcing Charles to leave France and turn to Spain for aid, which at that time ruled the Southern Netherlands.

Charles made the Treaty of Brussels with Spain in 1656. This gathered Spanish support for a restoration in return for Charles's contribution to the war against France. Charles raised a ragtag army from his exiled subjects; this small, underpaid, poorly equipped and ill-disciplined force formed the nucleus of the post-Restoration army. The Commonwealth made the Treaty of Paris with France in 1657 to join them in war against Spain in the Netherlands. Royalist supporters in the Spanish force were led by Charles's younger brother James, Duke of York. At the Battle of the Dunes in 1658, as part of the larger Spanish force, Charles's army of around 2,000 clashed with Commonwealth troops fighting with the French. By the end of the battle Charles's force was about 1,000 and with Dunkirk given to the English the prospect of a Royalist expedition to England was dashed.

== Restoration ==
After Oliver Cromwell's death in 1658, Charles's initial chances of regaining the Crown seemed slim; Cromwell was succeeded as Lord Protector by his son Richard but the new Lord Protector had little experience of either military or civil administration. In 1659, the Rump Parliament was recalled, and Richard Cromwell resigned. During the civil and military unrest that followed, George Monck, the Governor of Scotland, was concerned that the nation would descend into anarchy. Monck and his army marched into the City of London, and forced the Rump Parliament to readmit members of the Long Parliament who had been excluded in December 1648, during Pride's Purge. Parliament dissolved itself, and there was a general election for the first time in almost 20 years. The outgoing Parliament defined the electoral qualifications intending to bring about the return of a Presbyterian majority.

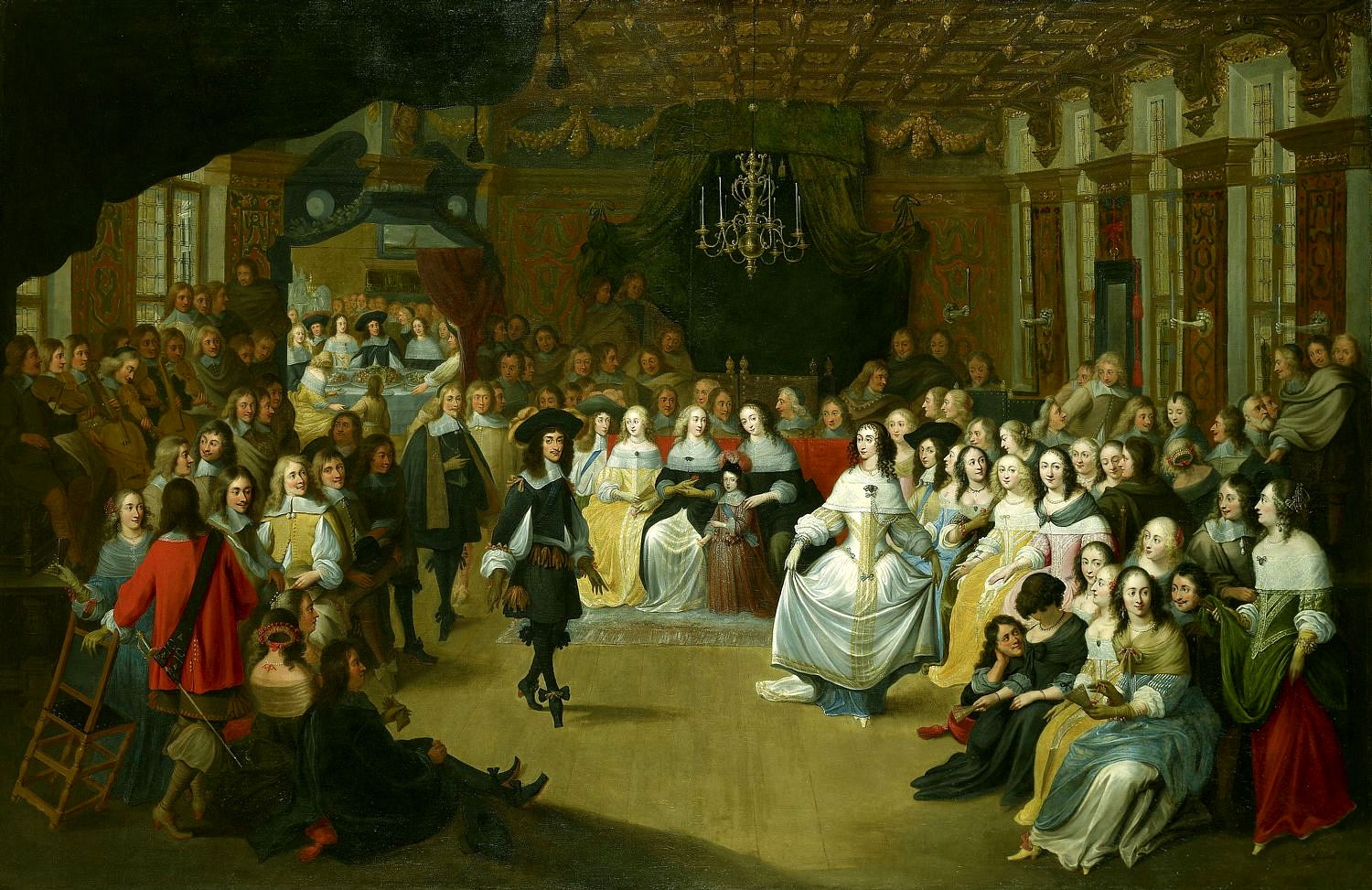
Ball given to Charles at The Hague on his departure to England

The restrictions against royalist candidates and voters were widely ignored, and the elections resulted in a House of Commons that was fairly evenly divided on political grounds between Royalists and Parliamentarians and on religious grounds between Anglicans and Presbyterians. The so-called Convention Parliament assembled on 25 April 1660, and soon afterwards welcomed the Declaration of Breda, in which Charles promised lenience and tolerance. There would be liberty of conscience, and Anglican church policy would not be harsh. He would not exile past enemies nor confiscate their wealth. There would be pardons for nearly all his opponents except the regicides. Above all, Charles promised to rule in cooperation with Parliament. The English Parliament resolved to proclaim Charles king and invite him to return, a message that reached Charles at Breda on 8 May 1660. In Ireland, a convention had been called earlier in the year and had already declared for Charles. On 14 May, he was proclaimed king in Dublin.

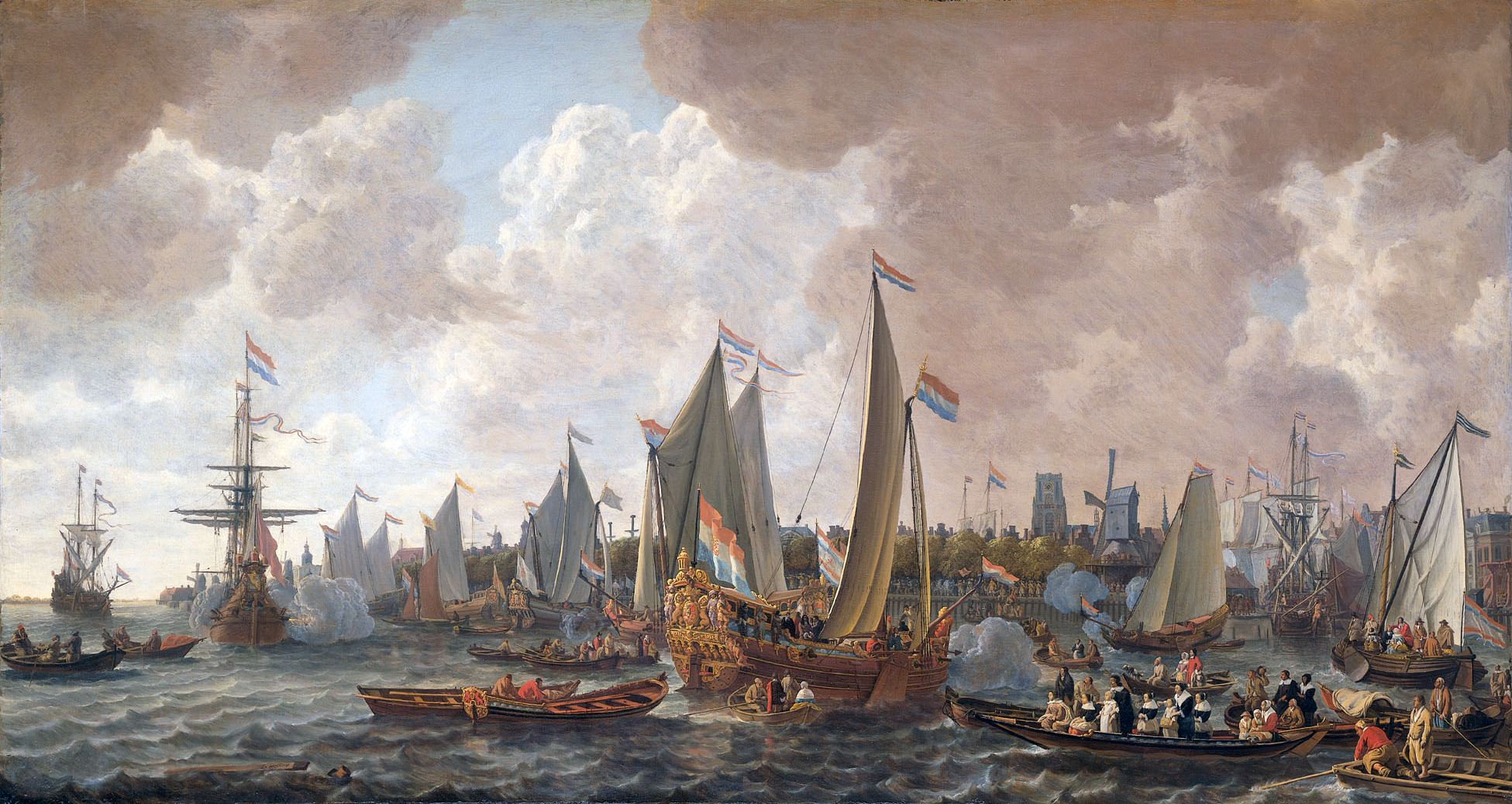
Charles sailed from his exile in the Netherlands to his restoration in England in May 1660. Painting by Lieve Verschuier.

Charles set out for England from Scheveningen, arrived in Dover on 25 May 1660 and reached London on 29 May, his 30th birthday. Although Charles and Parliament granted amnesty to nearly all of Cromwell's supporters in the Act of Indemnity and Oblivion, 50 people were specifically excluded. In the end nine of the regicides were executed: they were hanged, drawn and quartered, whereas others were given life imprisonment or excluded from office for life. The bodies of Oliver Cromwell, Henry Ireton and John Bradshaw were subjected to posthumous decapitations.

The English Parliament granted Charles an annual income to run the government of £1.2 million, generated largely from customs and excise duties. The grant, however, proved to be insufficient for most of Charles's reign. For the most part, the actual revenue was much lower, which led to attempts to economise at court by reducing the size and expenses of the royal household and raising money through unpopular innovations such as the hearth tax.

In the latter half of 1660, Charles's joy at the Restoration was tempered by the deaths of his siblings Henry and Mary of smallpox. At around the same time, Anne Hyde, the daughter of Lord Chancellor Edward Hyde, revealed that she was pregnant by Charles's brother James, whom she had secretly married. Edward Hyde, who had not known of either the marriage or the pregnancy, was created Earl of Clarendon and his position as Charles's favourite minister was strengthened.

=== Clarendon Code ===
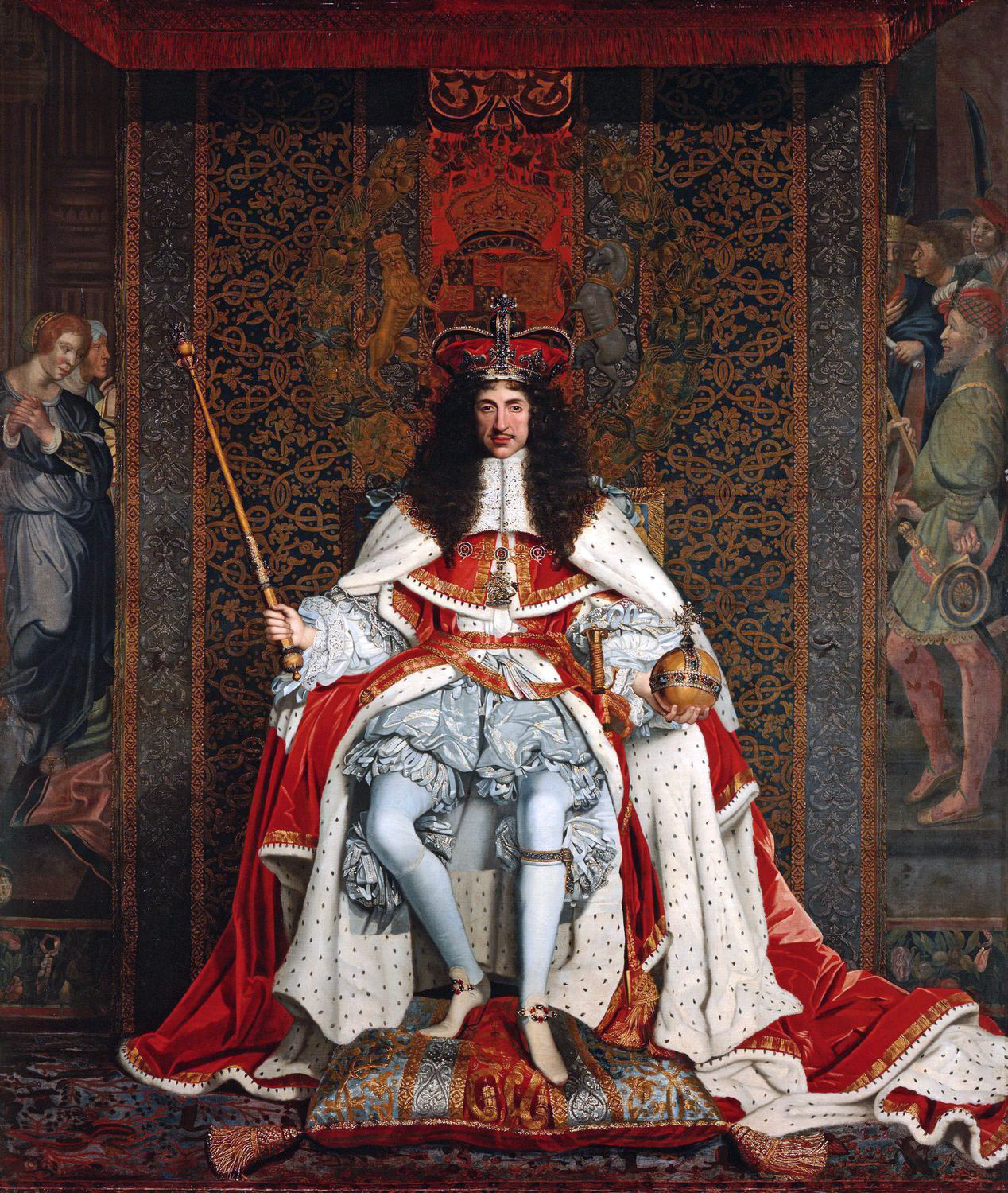
Coronation portrait: Charles was crowned at Westminster Abbey on 23 April 1661.

The Convention Parliament was dissolved in December 1660, and, shortly after Charles's English coronation, the second English Parliament of the reign assembled. Dubbed the Cavalier Parliament, it was overwhelmingly Royalist and Anglican. It sought to discourage non-conformity to the Church of England and passed several acts to secure Anglican dominance. The Corporation Act 1661 required municipal officeholders to swear allegiance; the Act of Uniformity 1662 made the use of the 1662 Book of Common Prayer compulsory; the Conventicle Act 1664 prohibited religious assemblies of more than five people, except under the auspices of the Church of England; and the Five Mile Act 1665 prohibited expelled non-conforming clergymen from coming within five miles (8 km) of a parish from which they had been banished. The Conventicle and Five Mile Acts remained in effect for the remainder of Charles's reign. The Acts became known as the Clarendon Code, after Lord Clarendon, even though he was not directly responsible for them and even spoke against the Five Mile Act.

The Restoration was accompanied by social change. Puritanism lost its momentum. Theatres reopened after having been closed during the protectorship of Oliver Cromwell, and bawdy "Restoration comedy" became a recognisable genre. Theatre licences granted by Charles required that female parts be played by "their natural performers", rather than by boys as was often the practice before; and Restoration literature celebrated or reacted to the restored court, which included libertines such as Lord Rochester. Of Charles II, Rochester supposedly said:

We have a pretty, witty king,
Whose word no man relies on,
He never said a foolish thing,
And never did a wise one

To which Charles is reputed to have replied "that the matter was easily accounted for: For that his discourse was his own, his actions were the ministry's".

=== Great Plague and Great Fire ===
In 1665, the Great Plague of London began, peaking in September with up to 7,000 deaths per week. Charles, his family, and the court fled London in July to Salisbury; Parliament met in Oxford. Plague cases ebbed over the winter, and Charles returned to London in February 1666.

After a long spell of hot and dry weather through mid-1666, the Great Fire of London started on 2 September 1666 in Pudding Lane. Fanned by strong winds and fed by wood and fuel stockpiled for winter, the fire destroyed about 13,200 houses and 87 churches, including St Paul's Cathedral. Charles and his brother James joined and directed the firefighting effort. The public blamed Catholic conspirators for the fire.

== Foreign policy and marriage ==
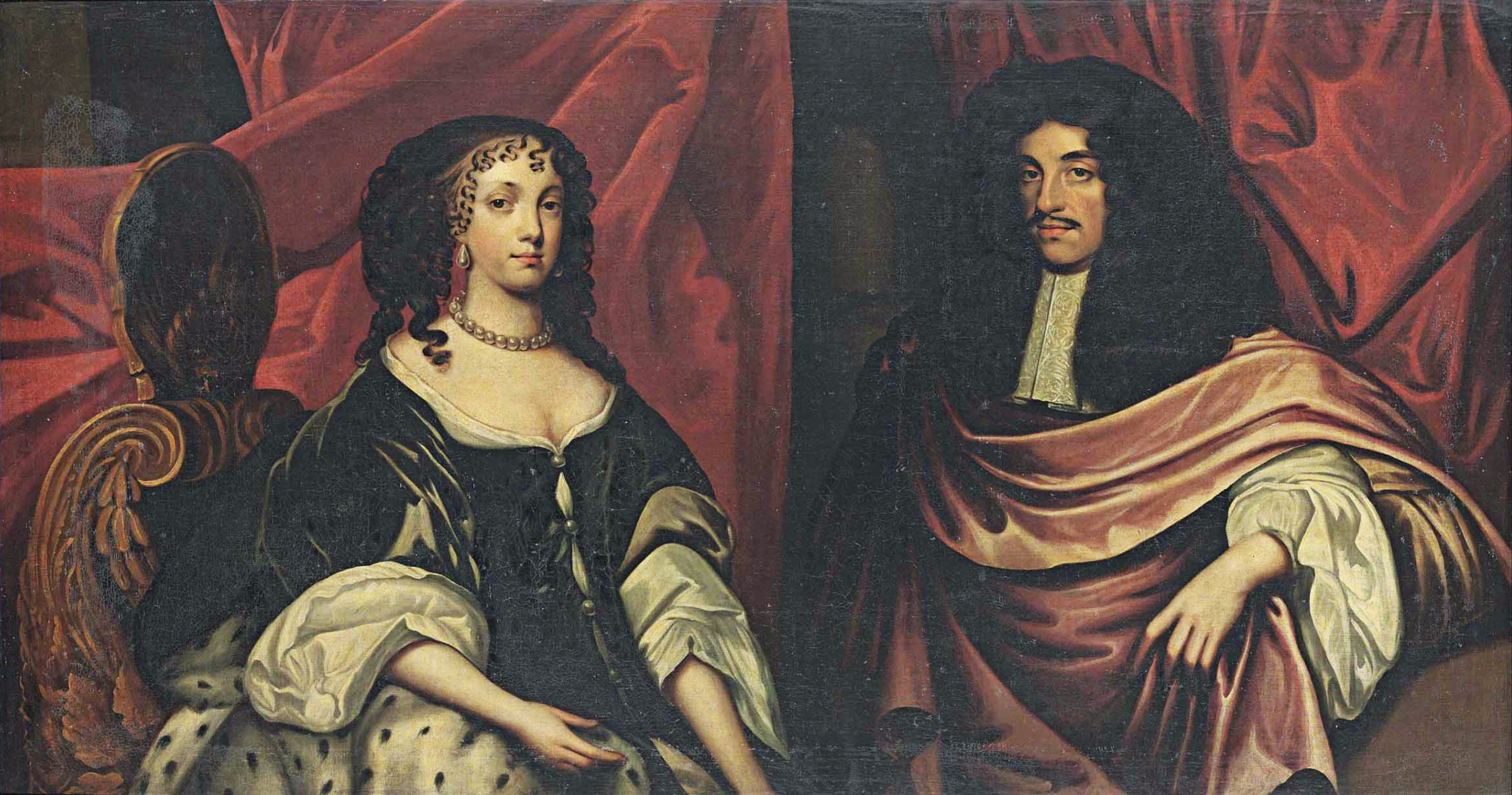
Charles and Catherine

Since 1640, Portugal had been fighting a war against Spain to restore its independence after a dynastic union of 60 years between the crowns of Spain and Portugal. Portugal had been helped by France, but in the Treaty of the Pyrenees in 1659 Portugal was abandoned by its French ally. Negotiations with Portugal for Charles's marriage to Catherine of Braganza began during his father's reign. Upon the restoration, Queen Luísa of Portugal, acting as regent, reopened negotiations with England that resulted in an alliance. On 23 June 1661, a marriage treaty was signed; England acquired Catherine's dowry of the port of Tangier in North Africa, the Seven Islands of Bombay in India (which had a major influence on the development of the British Empire), valuable trading privileges in Brazil and the East Indies, religious and commercial freedom in Portugal, and two million Portuguese crowns (equivalent to £300,000 then (Note: Equivalent to between £42.7 million (real cost) and £12.7 billion (economic share) as of 2021.)). Portugal obtained military and naval support against Spain and liberty of worship for Catherine.

Since Philip IV of Spain was an enemy of the Braganzas and was against a marriage between Catherine and any powerful European monarch, the Spanish government proposed other European princesses as possible brides for Charles, instead of Catherine, making clear that there were no available Spanish princesses and offering to provide a dowry. Their suggestions included: Princess Anna Sophie of Denmark, the eldest daughter of the Danish monarch; Princess Maria of Orange-Nassau, the youngest of the Dutch princesses of the House of Orange; and, as a Catholic alternative, the youngest sister of the Duke of Parma, Caterina Farnese, who was said to be very beautiful. In February 1661 the earl of Bristol travelled to Parma to inspect Farnese, but she refused to marry the English monarch, because she wanted to become a nun. Another Catholic alternative that was suggested was Eleonore Gonzaga, Empress Dowager of the Holy Roman Empire, although this was an unlikely match. Hedwig Eleonora of Holstein-Gottorp, Queen Dowager of Sweden, was also suggested as a bride for Charles. At the same time, the first minister of France, Cardinal Mazarin, offered a dowry of millions if Charles II married his niece, Hortense Mancini. Nevertheless, Charles dismissed the princesses offered by the Spanish and French governments, and chose to marry Catherine of Braganza because of her huge dowry. Catherine journeyed from Portugal to Portsmouth on 13–14 May 1662, but was not visited by Charles there until 20 May. The next day the couple were married at Portsmouth in two ceremonies—a Catholic one conducted in secret, followed by a public Anglican service.

The same year, in an unpopular move, Charles sold Dunkirk to King Louis XIV of France for about £375,000. The channel port, although a valuable strategic outpost, was a drain on Charles's limited finances, as it cost the Treasury £321,000 per year.

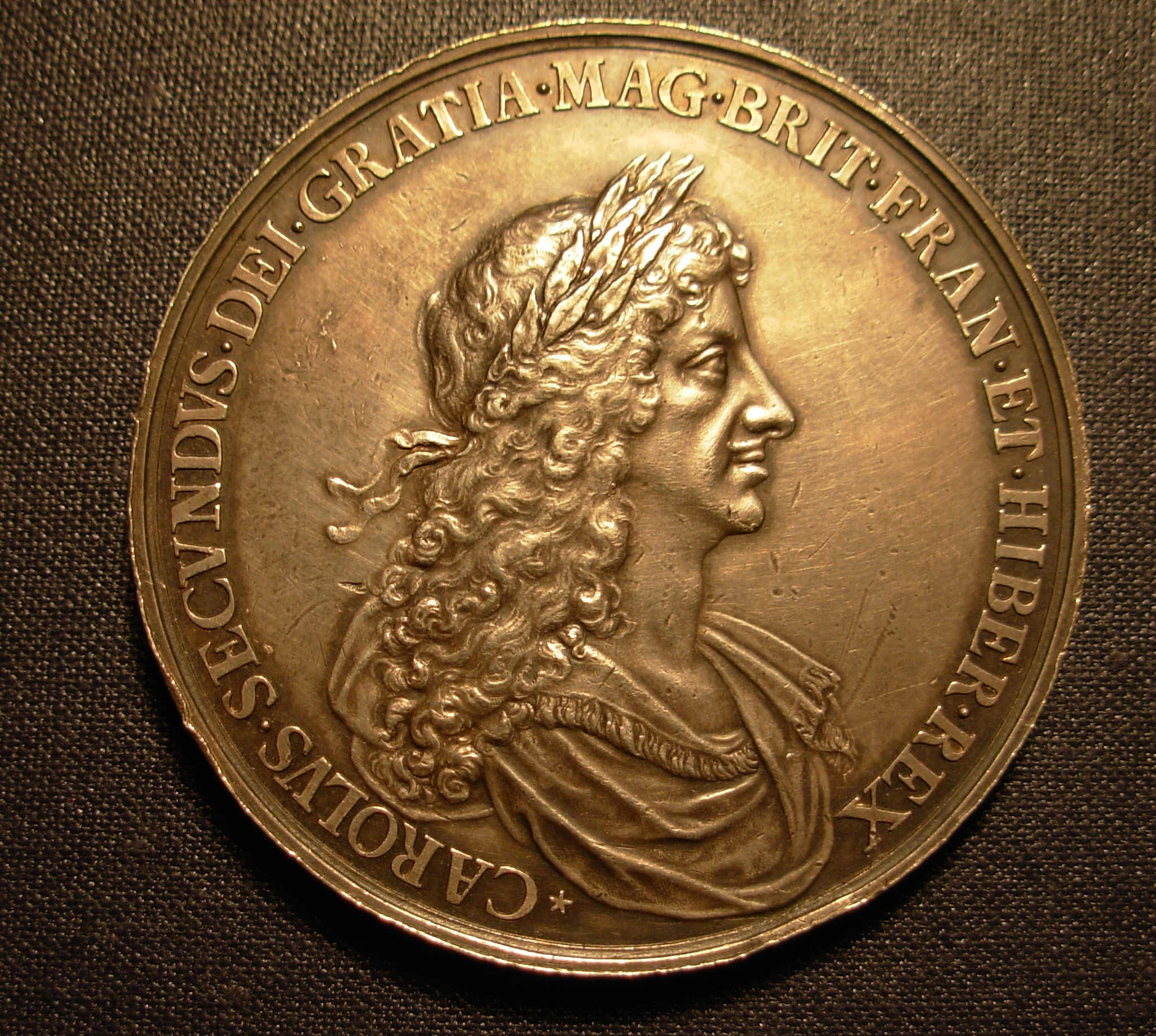
Charles II in profile on a medal struck in 1667 by John Roettiers to commemorate the Second Dutch War

Before Charles's restoration, the Navigation Acts of 1650 had hurt Dutch trade by giving English vessels a monopoly, and had started the First Dutch War (1652–1654). To lay foundations for a new beginning, envoys of the States General appeared in November 1660 with the Dutch Gift. The Second Dutch War (1665–1667) was started by English attempts to muscle in on Dutch possessions in Africa and North America. The conflict began well for the English, with the capture of New Amsterdam (renamed New York in honour of Charles's brother James, Duke of York) and a victory at the Battle of Lowestoft, but in 1667 the Dutch launched a surprise attack on England (the Raid on the Medway) when they sailed up the River Thames to where a major part of the English fleet was docked. Almost all of the ships were sunk except for the flagship, Royal Charles, which was taken back to the Netherlands as a prize. (Note: The ship's transom is on display at the Rijksmuseum in Amsterdam.) The Second Dutch War ended with the signing of the Treaty of Breda.

As a result of the Second Dutch War, Charles dismissed Lord Clarendon, whom he used as a scapegoat for the war. Clarendon fled to France when impeached for high treason (which carried the penalty of death). Power passed to five politicians known collectively by a whimsical acronym as the Cabal—the Baron Clifford, Earl of Arlington, Duke of Buckingham, Baron Ashley (afterwards Earl of Shaftesbury) and Duke of Lauderdale. In fact, the Cabal rarely acted in concert, and the court was often divided between two factions led by Arlington and Buckingham, with Arlington the more successful.

In 1668, England allied itself with Sweden and with its former enemy the Netherlands to oppose Louis XIV in the War of Devolution. Louis made peace with the Triple Alliance, but he continued to maintain his aggressive intentions towards the Netherlands. In 1670, Charles, seeking to solve his financial troubles, agreed to the Treaty of Dover, under which Louis would pay him £160,000 each year. In exchange, Charles agreed to supply Louis with troops and to announce his conversion to Catholicism "as soon as the welfare of his kingdom will permit". Louis was to provide him with 6,000 troops to suppress those who opposed the conversion. Charles endeavoured to ensure that the Treaty—especially the conversion clause—remained secret. It remains unclear whether Charles ever seriously intended to convert.

Meanwhile, by a series of five charters, Charles granted the East India Company the rights to autonomous government of its territorial acquisitions, to mint money, to command fortresses and troops, to form alliances, to make war and peace, and to exercise both civil and criminal jurisdiction over its possessions in the Indies. Earlier in 1668 he leased the islands of Bombay to the company for a nominal sum of £10 paid in gold. The Portuguese territories that Catherine brought with her as a dowry proved too expensive to maintain; Tangier was abandoned in 1684. In 1670, Charles granted control of the entire Hudson Bay drainage basin to the Hudson's Bay Company by royal charter, and named the territory Rupert's Land, after his cousin Prince Rupert of the Rhine, the company's first governor.

The Stop of the Exchequer of 1672 had lasting consequences for English public finance. By suspending payments on debts owed to the goldsmith-bankers, Charles II destroyed what little confidence remained in royal financial credit. Several of London's leading goldsmith-bankers, including Edward Backwell and Robert Viner, were ruined, and those who survived were reluctant to lend further to the Crown. The episode was widely perceived as a betrayal of commercial trust; Walter Bagehot later described it as "one of those monstrous frauds" that "ruined the goldsmiths and the credit of the Stuart government, which would never recover it".

== Conflict with Parliament ==
Although previously favourable to the Crown, the Cavalier Parliament was alienated by the king's wars and religious policies during the 1670s. In 1672, Charles issued the Royal Declaration of Indulgence, in which he purported to suspend all penal laws against Catholics and other religious dissenters. In the same year, he openly supported Catholic France and started the Third Anglo-Dutch War.

The Cavalier Parliament opposed the Declaration of Indulgence on constitutional grounds by claiming that the king had no right to arbitrarily suspend laws passed by Parliament. Charles withdrew the Declaration, and also agreed to the Test Act, which not only required public officials to receive the sacrament under the forms prescribed by the Church of England, but also later forced them to denounce transubstantiation and the Catholic Mass as "superstitious and idolatrous". Clifford, who had converted to Catholicism, resigned rather than take the oath, and died shortly after, possibly from suicide. By 1674, England had gained nothing from the Anglo-Dutch War, and the Cavalier Parliament refused to provide further funds, forcing Charles to make peace. The power of the Cabal waned, and that of Clifford's replacement Lord Danby grew.

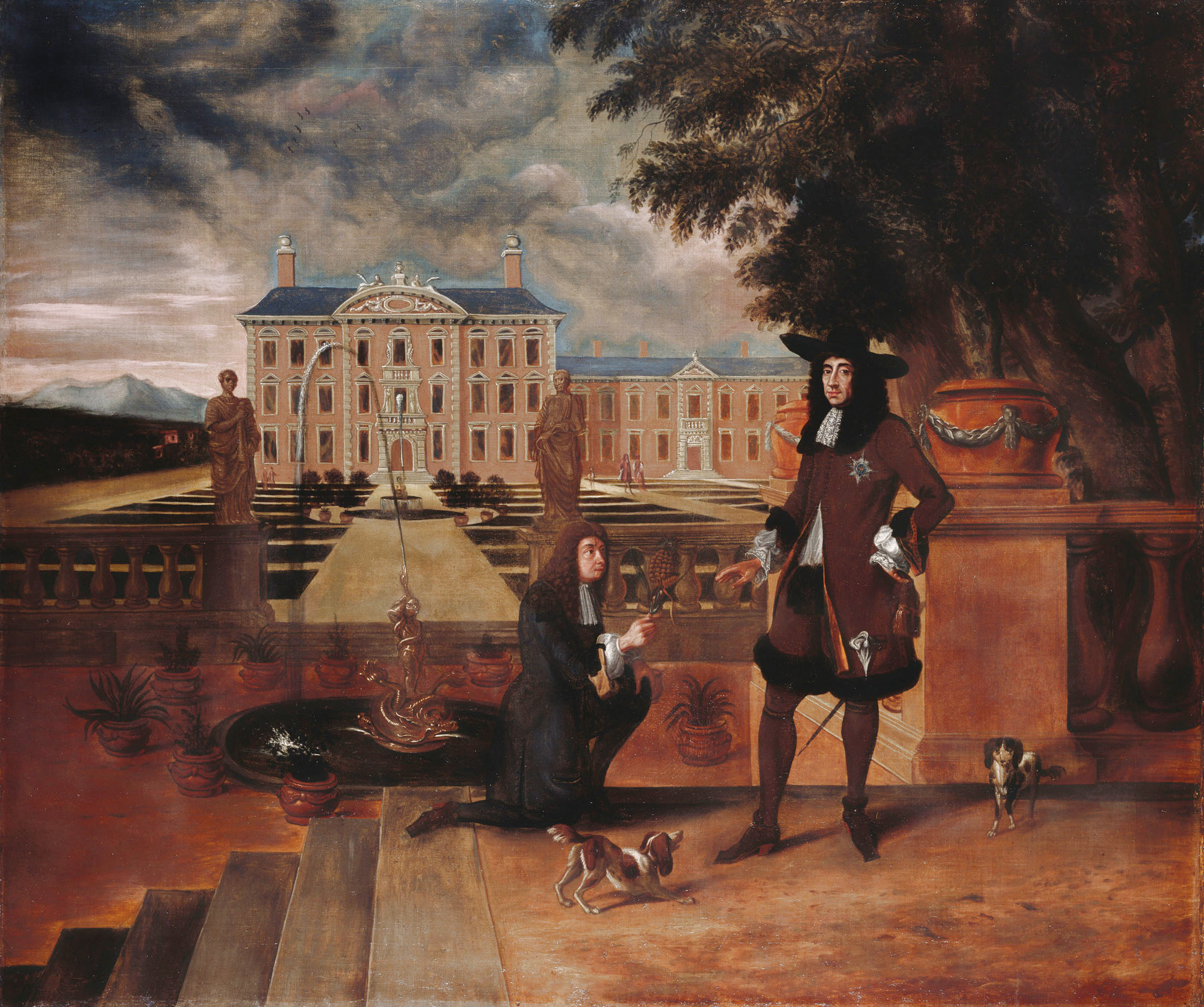
Charles II Presented with the First Pineapple Grown in England by Hendrick Danckerts, c. 1675–1680

Queen Catherine was unable to produce an heir; her four pregnancies had ended in miscarriages and stillbirths in 1662, February 1666, May 1668, and June 1669. Charles's heir presumptive was therefore his unpopular Catholic brother, James, Duke of York. Partly to assuage public fears that the royal family was too Catholic, Charles agreed that James's daughter Mary should marry the Protestant William of Orange. In 1678, Titus Oates, who had been alternately an Anglican and Jesuit priest, falsely warned of a "Popish Plot" to assassinate the king, even accusing the queen of complicity. Charles did not believe the allegations, but ordered his chief minister Lord Danby to investigate. While Danby seems to have been rightly sceptical of Oates's claims, the Cavalier Parliament took them seriously. The people were seized with an anti-Catholic hysteria; judges and juries across the land condemned the supposed conspirators; numerous innocent individuals were executed.

Later in 1678, the House of Commons impeached Danby for high treason. Although much of the nation had sought war with Catholic France, Charles had secretly negotiated with Louis XIV, trying to reach an agreement under which England would remain neutral in return for money. Danby had publicly professed that he was hostile to France, but had reservedly agreed to abide by Charles's wishes. The House of Commons did not view him as a reluctant participant in the scandal, instead believing that he was the author of the policy. To save Danby from the impeachment trial, Charles dissolved the Cavalier Parliament in January 1679.

The new English Parliament, which met in March of the same year, was quite hostile to Charles. Many members feared that he had intended to use the standing army to suppress dissent or impose Catholicism. However, with insufficient funds voted by Parliament, Charles was forced to gradually disband his troops. Having lost the support of Parliament, Danby resigned his post of Lord High Treasurer, but received a pardon from the king. In defiance of the royal will, the House of Commons declared that the dissolution of Parliament did not interrupt impeachment proceedings, and that the pardon was therefore invalid. When the House of Lords attempted to impose the punishment of exile—which the Commons thought too mild—the impeachment became stalled between the two Houses. As he had been required to do so many times during his reign, Charles bowed to his opponents' wishes, committing Danby to the Tower of London, in which he was held for another five years.

== Science ==
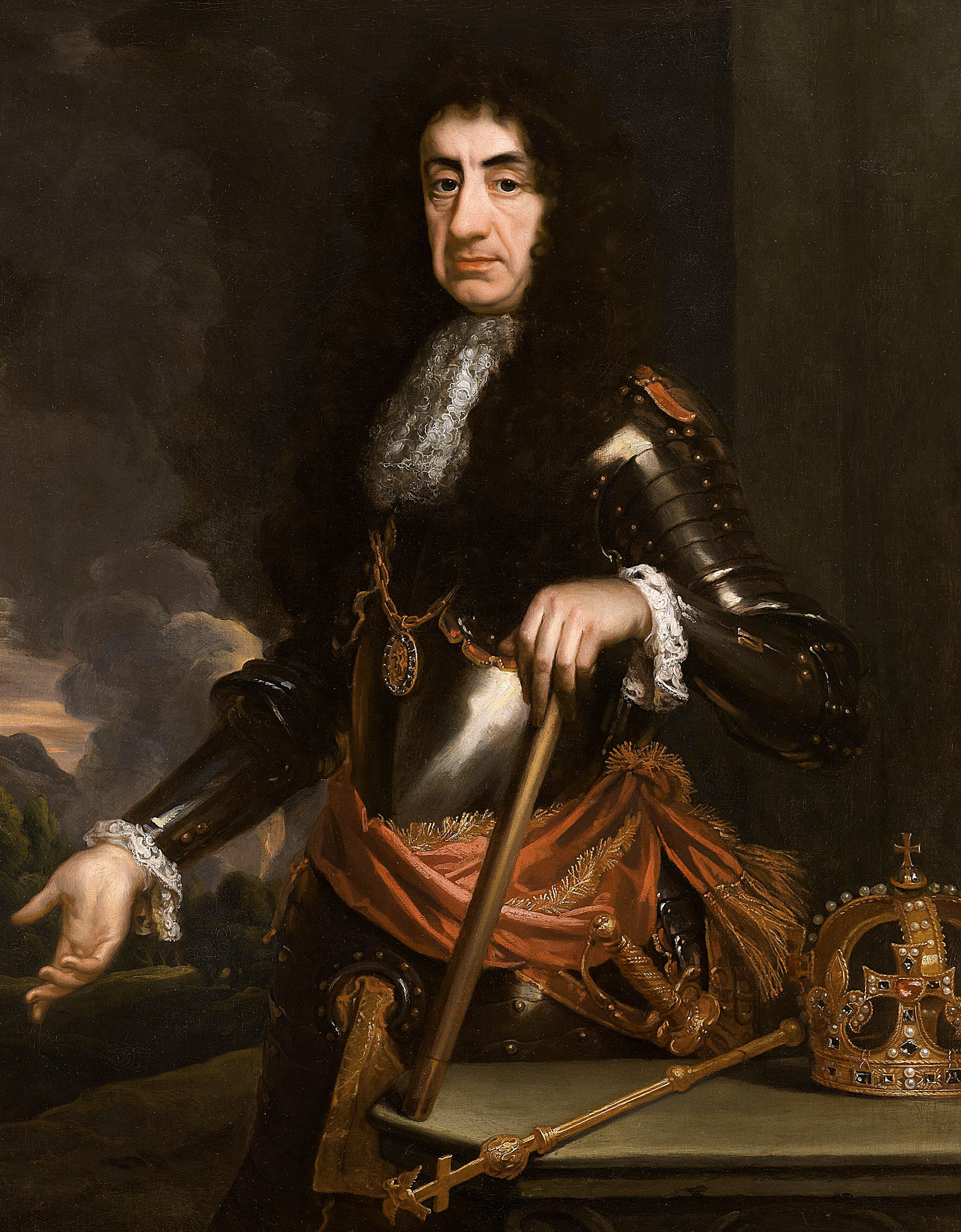
Portrait by John Riley, c. 1683–1684

In Charles's early childhood, William Cavendish, Earl of Newcastle, was governor of the royal household and Brian Duppa, the Dean of Christ Church, Oxford, was his tutor. Neither man thought that the study of science subjects was appropriate for a future king, and Newcastle even advised against studying any subject too seriously. However, as Charles grew older, the surgeon William Harvey was appointed his tutor. Harvey was famous for his work on human blood circulation, and had already held the position of physician to Charles I. His studies were to influence Charles II's attitude towards science. As the king's chief physician, Harvey accompanied Charles I to the Battle of Edgehill and, although some details are uncertain, he had charge of Prince Charles and the Duke of York in the morning. But the two boys were back with the king for the start of battle. Later in the afternoon, as their father grew concerned for their safety, the princes left the battlefield with Sir W. Howard and his pensioners.

During his exile, in France, Charles continued his education, including physics, chemistry and mathematics. His tutors included the cleric John Earle, well known for his satirical book Microcosmographie, with whom he studied Latin and Greek, and Thomas Hobbes, the philosopher and author of Leviathan, with whom he studied mathematics. In France, Charles assisted his childhood friend, George Villiers, 2nd Duke of Buckingham, with his experiments in chemistry and alchemy, with the Earl convinced he was close to producing the philosopher's stone. Although some of Charles's studies abroad may have helped to pass the time, upon returning to England, he was already knowledgeable in the mathematics of navigation, and was a competent chemist. Such was his knowledge of naval architecture that he was able to participate in technical discussions on the subject with Samuel Pepys, William Petty and John Evelyn.

New discoveries and concepts fascinated Charles, not only in science and medicine, but also in botany and gardening. Sorbier, a French traveller visiting the English court, was astonished by the extent of the king's knowledge. The king freely indulged in his many interests, including astronomy. In October 1660, he visited Gresham College to see new telescopes developed by astronomer Sir Paul Neile. Charles was so impressed by what he saw that he ordered his own 36' telescope, which he had installed in the Privy Garden at Whitehall. He would invite friends and acquaintances to view the heavens through his new telescope. Evelyn describes his May 1661 visit to the Garden, with several other scientists, to view Saturn's rings. Charles also had a laboratory installed in Whitehall, within easy access to his bedroom.

From the beginning of his reign, Charles appointed experts to assist him in his scientific pursuits. These included: Timothy Clarke, a celebrated anatomist, who performed some dissections for the king; Robert Morison as his chief botanist (Charles had his own botanical garden); Edmund Dickinson, a chemist and alchemist tasked with carrying out experiments in the king's laboratory; Sir Thomas Williams, skilled in compounding and inventing medicines, sometimes prepared in the royal presence; and Nicasius le Febure (or Nicolas LeFevre), who was invited to England as royal professor of chemistry and apothecary to the king's household. Evelyn visited his laboratory with the king.

In addition to his many other interests, the king was fascinated by clock mechanisms, and had clocks distributed around Whitehall, including seven in his bedroom. Robert Bruce (later Earl of Ailesbury), a Gentleman of the Bedchamber, complained that the continual noise of chiming clocks disturbed his sleep whenever he needed to stay close by to the king. Charles had a sundial installed in the Privy Garden, by which he could set his personal pocket watch. (For a while, the king personally recorded the performance of the latest spring-balance watch, presented to him by Robert Hooke.)

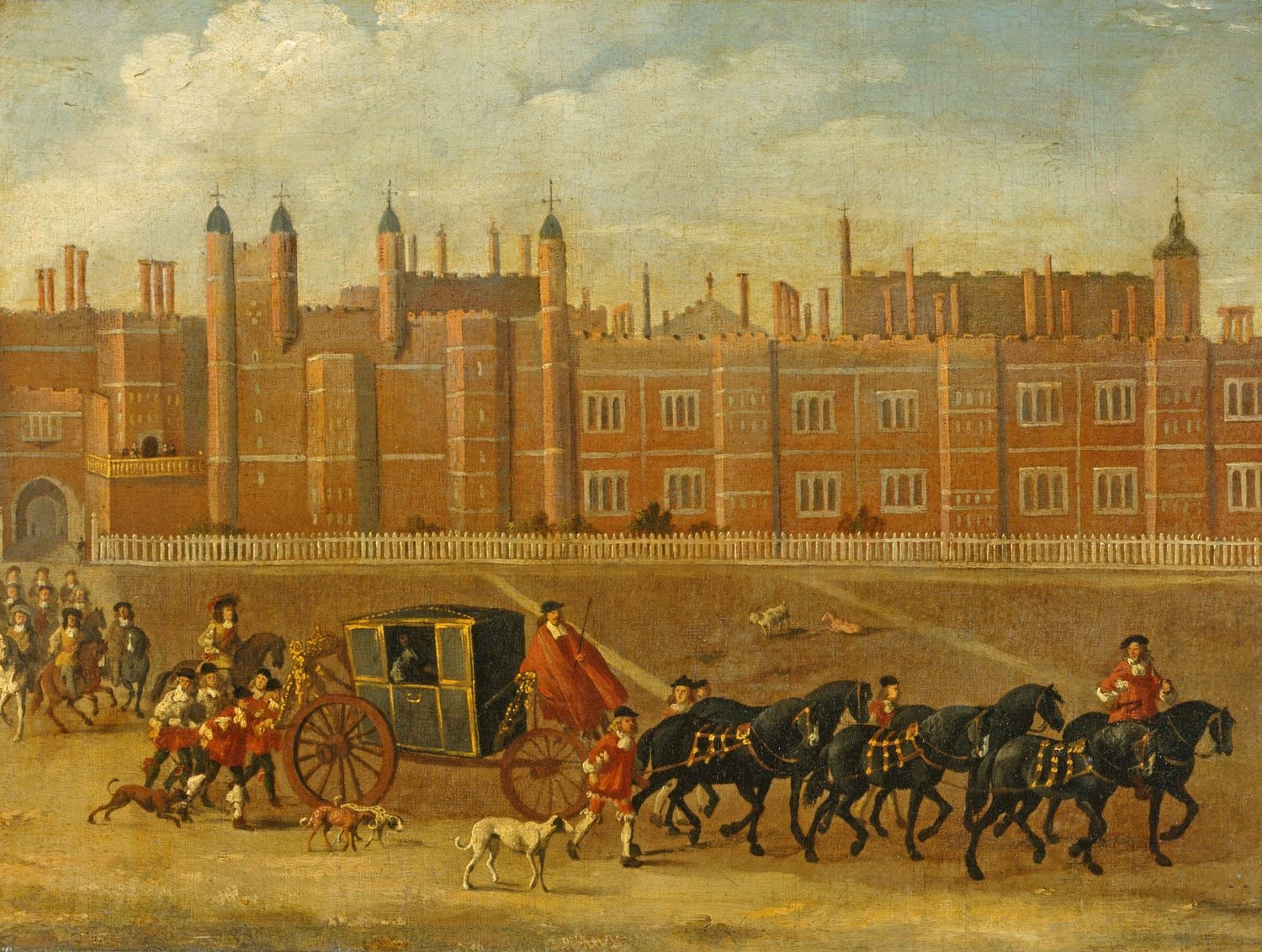
Charles leaving Hampton Court Palace

In 1662, Charles granted a royal charter to the formal society of scientists and others established in 1660 to give a more academic and learned approach to science, and to conduct experiments in physics and mathematics. Sir Robert Moray, a member of Charles's court, played an important part in this, and became the first president of this new Royal Society. Moray was an important go-between for Charles and the Society, over the years, and his standing with the king was so high that he was given access to the royal laboratory to perform his own experiments.

Charles never attended a Society meeting, but remained aware of activities there from his discussions with Society members, especially Moray. In addition, Robert Boyle gave him a private viewing of the Boyle/Hooke air-pump, which was used at many of the Wednesday meetings. Charles however preferred experiments with an immediate practical outcome, and laughed at Society members' efforts to "weigh air". He seemed unable to grasp the significance of basic laws of physics being established at that time, including Boyle's law and Hooke's law, the concept of atmospheric pressure and the barometer, and the importance of air to support life.

Although Charles lost interest in the activities of the society, he continued to support scientific and commercial endeavours, founding the Mathematical School at Christ's Hospital in 1673. Following concerns over French advances in astronomy, he founded the Royal Observatory at Greenwich, two years later. Maintaining his interest in chemistry, he regularly visited his private laboratory, and observed occasional dissections there. Pepys noted in his diary that on the morning of Friday, 15 January 1669, while Pepys walked to Whitehall, the king invited him to his chemistry laboratory. Pepys confessed to finding what he saw there beyond him.

Charles developed painful gout in later life which limited the daily walks that he took regularly when younger. He now channelled his keenness to his laboratory, devoting himself to experiments for hours, sometimes helped by Moray. Charles was particularly interested in alchemy, which he had first encountered many years earlier during his exile with the Duke of Buckingham. Charles resumed experiments with mercury, spending whole mornings attempting to distill it. Heating mercury in an open crucible releases toxic mercury vapour, which may have contributed to his later ill health.

== Navy ==
Charles had a great interest in naval affairs. (Note: The navy of the time consumed about a third of England's tax revenue in peacetime. That rose to about 50% in time of war. The dockyards were the biggest industrial complexes in the country.) He regularly attended meetings of the Admiralty Board and was the most frequent participant between January 1674 and April 1679. Samuel Pepys described the management of the navy, between 1673 and 1679, as being "wholly performed by the immediate direction of" the king, with the advice of the Duke of York (the future James II). Decisions made by the king alone and those made by the Admiralty Board can be differentiated in Pepys's minutes by his terminology. This makes clear that decisions on deployment of warships and on appointment of their commissioned officers were almost exclusively made by Charles. Surviving Royal records on the navy contain sailing orders and instructions not recorded in the Admiralty minutes, confirming this conclusion.

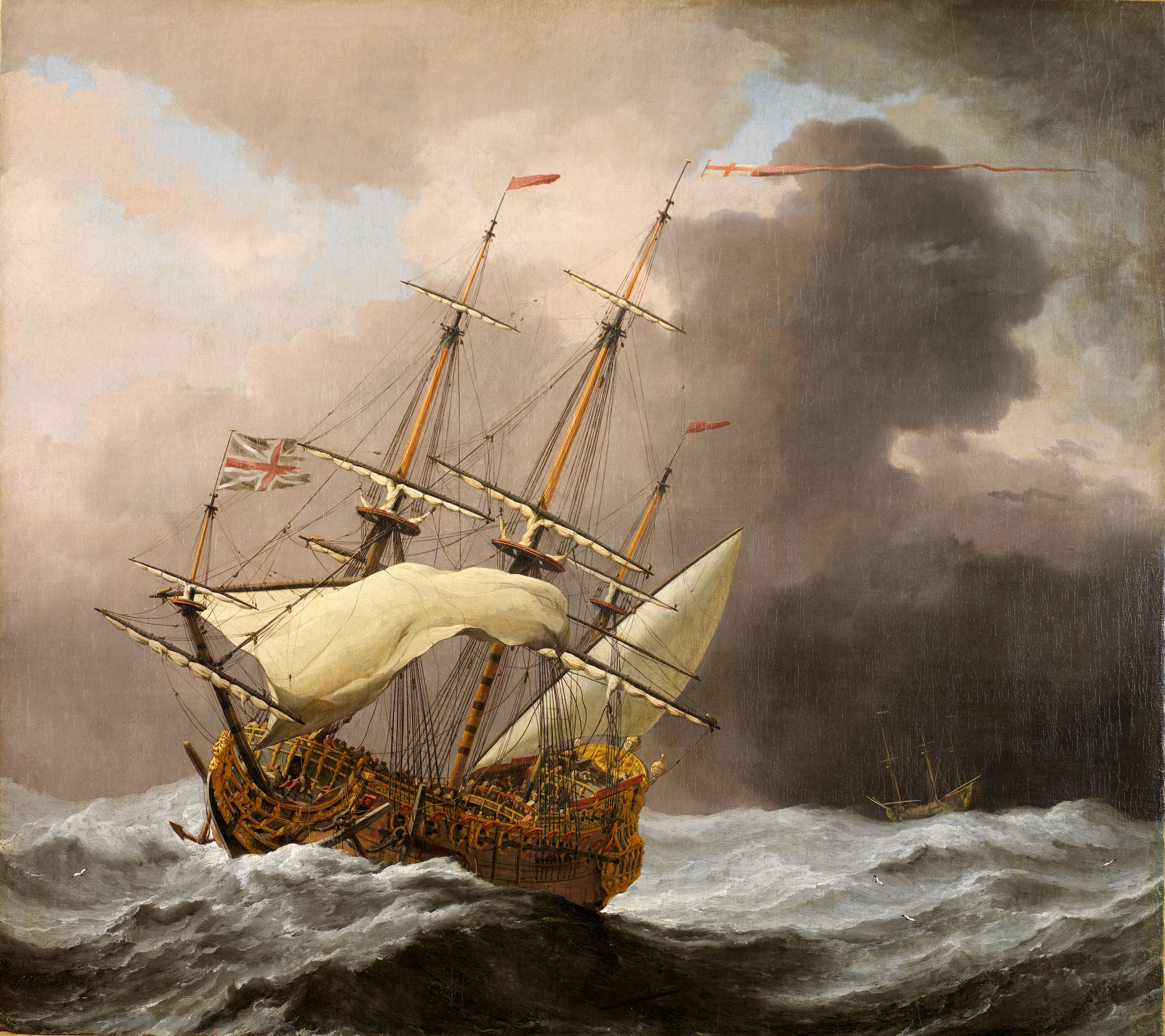
HMS Hampton Court, a third-rate in the thirty ship programme

Charles voluntarily took on more mundane management tasks, and signed all captains' and lieutenants' commissions. His signature was, for example, on the warrant for Thomas Shish as master shipwright at Sheerness, with Charles having the final choice, 6 months later, of appointing Shish to the same position in the Woolwich Dockyard. He was present at most important ship launches and many minor ones. Charles alone chose all new ships' names, so the name usually travelled to each launching ceremony in the king's head.

Following the political crisis of 1678, the Admiralty Board demanded, in January 1679, they regain control of some functions carried out by the King. Before Charles ultimately conceded, he appointed 88 warrant officers on 10 May for new ships built under the thirty ship programme, (Note: The thirty ship programme was authorised by parliament on 23 February 1677. It was to address the realisation that the English navy was smaller than that of either the French or the Dutch. One first-rate of 1,400 tons, nine second-rates, each of 1,100 tons, and 20 third-rates, each of not less than 900 tons, were approved.) before the Board took over such appointments. Thereafter, he used the royal prerogative to get his way on any decisions with which he disagreed. An example of Charles's continuing control of operational naval matters is his support for Arthur Herbert as commander-in-chief in the Mediterranean from 1679 to 1683. Herbert was widely disliked, and the Admiralty Board and Pepys (who were not normally allies) asked for his dismissal. The King consistently resisted, with the benefit that Herbert's tactic of relying on convoys to protect British ships was shown to have the best result.

Further political problems had, by 1682, left the Admiralty Board split along political lines, reducing its ability to function. (Pepys was no longer in post.) Charles took advantage of this, creating the "Irish Squadron", a naval force under his direct administration, with orders going through the Secretary of State, rather than the Admiralty. The squadron was immediately used to supply the English colony in Tangier. Charles gave detailed orders for these ships, with the Secretary of State merely passing them on.

Charles had a good understanding of naval architecture and took decisions on the plans for new ships. For instance, among his interventions in the thirty ship programme, he pointed out that with the French as a likely enemy in future wars, English warships would need to spend longer at sea than when fighting the Dutch. (Note: If France were the opponent, naval campaigns could be expected to range from the Channel to the Mediterranean. Combat against the Dutch would likely be in the southern part of the North Sea and the eastern end of the Channel.) Consequently, Charles insisted on the third-rates being built larger than the minimum size laid down by parliament. This increased the capacity of stores, but also made the ships more seaworthy and better gun platforms. He guaranteed to pay the extra costs from his own funds, but with the ships built, he then reneged on this promise. Charles also instructed that ships in the programme should be launched as soon as the hulls were ready, with remaining work to be done afloat. This freed up docks and slipways for the next ship, speeding the ambitious construction timetable.

Not all Charles's efforts in naval architecture were successful. When launched, the experimental HMS Royal Katherine needed immediate remedial work (Note: The process involved was girdling, the addition of an extra layer of planking below the waterline to provide extra breadth to the hull and therefore make the ship more stable.) to correct instability. Charles supported a suggestion by Pepys that the draught of ships in the thirty ship programme could be reduced. This was strongly resisted by the shipwrights, and the King ultimately deferred to their expert opinion.

Charles learnt to sail after fleeing the Royalist defeat in the Civil War. Taking refuge in Jersey in 1646, he was provided with a pinnace for his amusement. He regularly took the helm and was under the tuition of Royalist naval officers who had similarly left England. After the Restoration, Charles had a number of Royal Yachts and frequently sailed them.

== Later years ==
Charles faced a political storm over his brother James, a Catholic, being next in line to the throne. The prospect of a Catholic monarch was vehemently opposed by the 1st Earl of Shaftesbury (a former member of the Cabal, which had fallen apart in 1673). Lord Shaftesbury's power base was strengthened when the House of Commons of 1679 introduced the Exclusion Bill, which sought to exclude the Duke of York from the line of succession. Some even sought to confer the Crown on the Protestant Duke of Monmouth, the eldest of Charles's illegitimate children. The Abhorrers—those who thought the Exclusion Bill was abhorrent—were named Tories (after a term for dispossessed Irish Catholic bandits), while the Petitioners—those who supported a petitioning campaign in favour of the Exclusion Bill—were called Whigs (after a term for rebellious Scottish Presbyterians).

=== Absolute monarch ===
Fearing that the Exclusion Bill would be passed, and bolstered by some acquittals in the continuing Plot trials, which seemed to him to indicate a more favourable public mood towards Catholicism, Charles dissolved the English Parliament, for a second time that year, in mid-1679. Charles's hopes for a more moderate Parliament were not fulfilled; within a few months he had dissolved Parliament yet again, after it sought to pass the Exclusion Bill. When a new Parliament assembled at Oxford in March 1681, Charles dissolved it for a fourth time after just a few days. During the 1680s, however, popular support for the Exclusion Bill ebbed, and Charles experienced a nationwide surge of loyalty. Lord Shaftesbury was prosecuted (albeit unsuccessfully) for treason in 1681 and later fled to Holland, where he died. For the remainder of his reign, Charles ruled without Parliament.

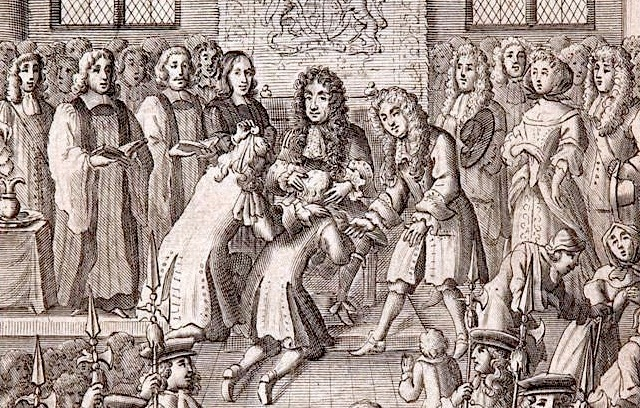
Charles performing the royal touch; engraving by Robert White, 1684

Charles's opposition to the Exclusion Bill angered some Protestants. Protestant conspirators formulated the Rye House Plot, a plan to murder him and the Duke of York as they returned to London after horse races in Newmarket. A great fire, however, destroyed Charles's lodgings at Newmarket, which forced him to leave the races early, thus inadvertently avoiding the planned attack. News of the failed plot was leaked. Protestant politicians such as the Earl of Essex, Algernon Sydney, Lord Russell and the Duke of Monmouth were implicated in the plot. Essex slit his own throat while imprisoned in the Tower of London; Sydney and Russell were executed for high treason on very flimsy evidence; and the Duke of Monmouth went into exile at the court of William of Orange. Lord Danby and the surviving Catholic lords held in the Tower were released and the king's Catholic brother, James, acquired greater influence at court. Titus Oates was convicted and imprisoned for defamation.

Thus through the last years of Charles's reign, his approach towards his opponents changed, and he was compared by Whigs to the contemporary Louis XIV of France, with his form of government in those years termed "slavery". Many of them were prosecuted and their estates seized, with Charles replacing judges and sheriffs at will and packing juries to achieve conviction. To destroy opposition in London, Charles first disenfranchised many Whigs in the 1682 municipal elections, and in 1683 the London charter was forfeited. In retrospect, the use of the judicial system by Charles (and later his brother and heir James) as a tool against opposition helped establish the idea of separation of powers between the judiciary and the Crown in Whig thought.

=== Death ===
Charles suffered a sudden apoplectic fit on the morning of 2 February 1685, and died four days later at the Palace of Whitehall, at 11:45 am, aged 54. The suddenness of his illness and death led to suspicion of poison in the minds of many, including one of the royal doctors, but a more modern medical analysis has held that the symptoms of his final illness are similar to those of uraemia, a clinical syndrome due to kidney dysfunction. Charles had a laboratory among his many interests where, prior to his illness, he had been experimenting with mercury. Mercuric poisoning can produce irreversible kidney damage, but the case for that being a cause of his death is unproven. In the days between his collapse and his death, Charles endured a variety of torturous treatments, including bloodletting, purging and cupping, in the hope of effecting a recovery, which may have exacerbated his uraemia through dehydration, rather than helping to alleviate it.

On his deathbed, Charles asked his brother, James, to look after his mistresses: "be well to Portsmouth, and let not poor Nelly starve". He told his courtiers, "I am sorry, gentlemen, for being such a time a-dying", and expressed regret at his treatment of his wife. On the last evening of his life he was received into the Catholic Church, in the presence of Father John Huddleston, though the extent to which he was fully conscious or committed, and with whom the idea originated, is unclear. He was buried in Westminster Abbey "without any manner of pomp" on 14 February.

Charles was succeeded by his brother James II and VII.

== Legacy ==
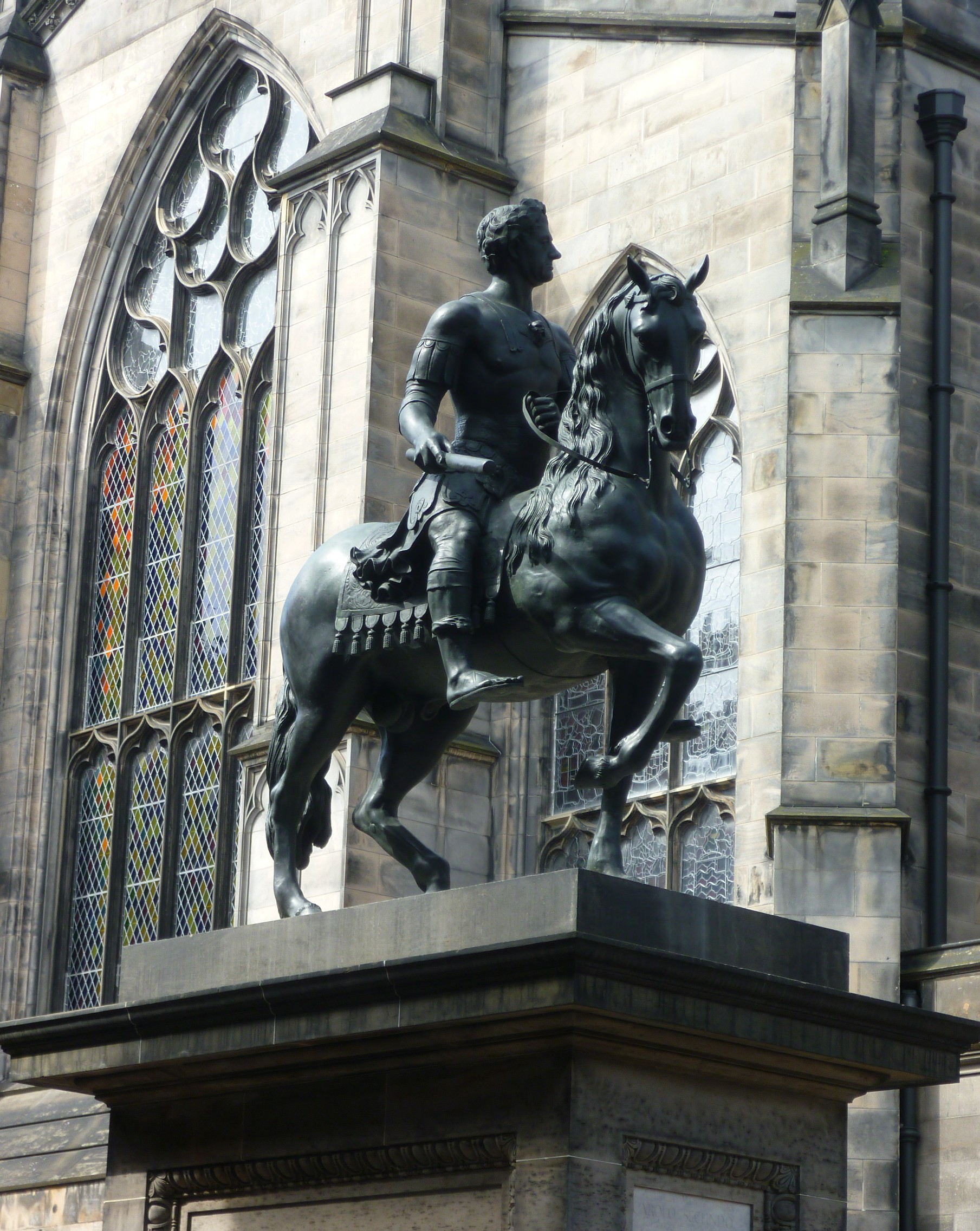
Statue of Charles II as a Roman Caesar, erected 1685, Parliament Square, Edinburgh

His encouragement of theatre, horse racing, and traditional celebrations included the revival of public Christmas festivities after the Puritan rule of Oliver Cromwell during the English Interregnum. His reputation for hedonism led later commentators to nickname him the "Merry Monarch" and for his reign to be described as a "Golden Age". However, his biographer Antonia Fraser has written that "Merry Monarch" was not appropriate, as Charles was, at heart, marked by melancholy.

Charles delighted and bored listeners with tales of his escape after his defeat at the Battle of Worcester for many years. Numerous accounts of his adventures were published, particularly in the immediate aftermath of the Restoration. Though not averse to his escape being ascribed to divine providence, Charles himself seems to have delighted most in his ability to sustain his disguise as a man of ordinary origins, and to move unrecognised through his realm. Ironic and cynical, Charles took pleasure in stories that demonstrated the undetectable nature of any inherent majesty he possessed.

Charles had no legitimate children, but acknowledged at least twelve by seven mistresses, including five by Barbara Villiers, Lady Castlemaine, for whom the Dukedom of Cleveland was created. His other mistresses included Moll Davis, Nell Gwyn, Elizabeth Killigrew, Catherine Pegge, Lucy Walter and Louise de Kérouaille, Duchess of Portsmouth. As a result, in his lifetime he was often nicknamed "Old Rowley", the name of his favourite racehorse, notable as a stallion.

Charles's subjects resented paying taxes that were spent on his mistresses and their children, many of whom received dukedoms or earldoms. The present Dukes of Buccleuch, Richmond, Grafton and St Albans descend from Charles in unbroken male line. Charles II is an ancestor of both King Charles III's wives, Diana Spencer (Note: Diana was descended from two of Charles II's illegitimate sons: the Dukes of Grafton and Richmond.) and Camilla Shand. Charles and Diana's son, William, Prince of Wales, is likely to be the first British monarch descended from Charles II.

Charles's eldest son, the Duke of Monmouth, led a rebellion against James II, but was defeated at the Battle of Sedgemoor on 6 July 1685, captured and executed. James was eventually dethroned in 1688, in the course of the Glorious Revolution.

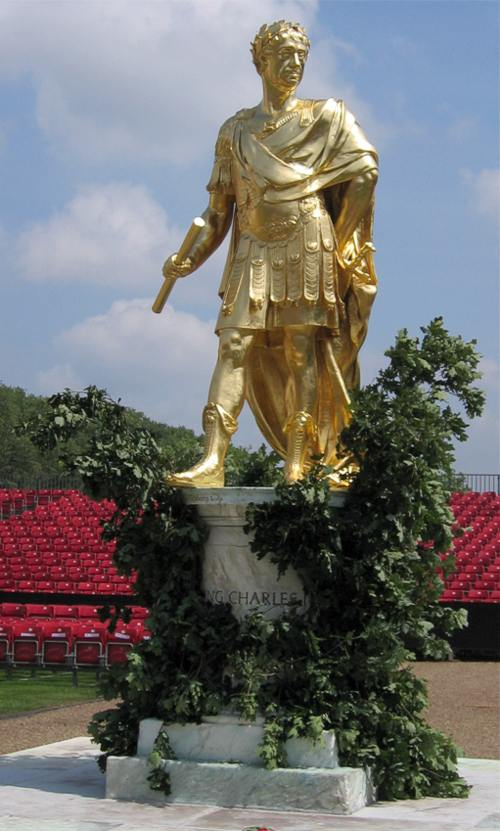
Statue of Charles II (c. 1682) in ancient Roman dress by Grinling Gibbons at the Royal Hospital Chelsea

In the words of his contemporary John Evelyn, "a prince of many virtues and many great imperfections, debonair, easy of access, not bloody or cruel". John Wilmot, 2nd Earl of Rochester, wrote of Charles:

Restless he rolls from whore to whore
A merry monarch, scandalous and poor.

Looking back on Charles's reign, Tories tended to view it as a time of benevolent monarchy whereas Whigs perceived it as a terrible despotism. Professor Ronald Hutton summarises a polarised historiography:

For the past hundred years, books on Charles II have been sharply divided into two categories. Academic historians have concentrated mainly on his activities as a statesman and emphasised his duplicity, self-indulgence, poor judgement and lack of an aptitude for business or for stable and trustworthy government. Non-academic authors have concentrated mainly on his social and cultural world, emphasising his charm, affability, worldliness, tolerance, turning him into one of the most popular of all English monarchs in novels, plays and films.

Hutton says Charles was a popular king in his own day and a "legendary figure" in British history.

Other kings had inspired more respect, but perhaps only Henry VIII had endeared himself to the popular imagination as much as this one. He was the playboy monarch, naughty but nice, the hero of all who prized urbanity, tolerance, good humour, and the pursuit of pleasure above the more earnest, sober, or material virtues.

The anniversary of the Restoration (which was also Charles's birthday)—29 May—was recognised in England until the mid-nineteenth century as Oak Apple Day, after the Royal Oak in which Charles hid during his escape from the forces of Oliver Cromwell. Traditional celebrations involved the wearing of oak leaves but these have now died out. Charles II is depicted extensively in art, literature and media. Charleston, South Carolina, and South Kingstown, Rhode Island, are named after him. King Charles's Island and Charles Island are previous names of both Floreana Island and Española Island in the Galapagos Archipelago, both in his honour.

== Titles, styles, honours and arms ==
=== Titles and styles ===
The official style of Charles II as king (after 1649) was "Charles the Second, by the Grace of God, King of England, Scotland, France and Ireland, Defender of the Faith, etc." The claim to France was only nominal, and had been asserted by every English monarch since Edward III, regardless of the amount of French territory actually controlled.

=== Honours ===
- KG: Knight of the Garter, 21 May 1638

=== Arms ===
Charles's coat of arms as Prince of Wales was the royal arms (which he later inherited), differenced by a label of three points Argent. His arms as monarch were: Quarterly, I and IV Grandquarterly, Azure three fleurs-de-lis Or (for France) and Gules three lions passant guardant in pale Or (for England); II Or a lion rampant within a double tressure flory-counter-flory Gules (for Scotland); III Azure a harp Or stringed Argent (for Ireland).

Coats of arms of Charles II of England

Coat of arms as Prince of Wales

Coat of arms of Charles II as king (outside Scotland)

Coat of arms of Charles II used as king in Scotland

== Issue ==
By Lucy Walter (c. 1630 – 1658):

- James Crofts, later Scott (1649–1685), created Duke of Monmouth (1663) in England and Duke of Buccleuch (1663) in Scotland. Monmouth was born nine months after Walter and Charles II first met, and was acknowledged as his son by Charles II, but James II suggested that he was the son of another of her lovers, Colonel Robert Sidney, rather than Charles. Lucy Walter had a daughter, Mary Crofts, born after James in 1651, but Charles II was not the father, since he and Walter parted in September 1649.

By Elizabeth Killigrew (1622–1680), daughter of Sir Robert Killigrew and wife of Francis Boyle, 1st Viscount Shannon:

- Charlotte Jemima Henrietta Maria FitzRoy (1650–1684), married firstly James Howard and secondly William Paston, 2nd Earl of Yarmouth

By Catherine Pegge:

- Charles FitzCharles (1657–1680), known as "Don Carlo", created Earl of Plymouth (1675)
- Catherine FitzCharles (born 1658; she either died young or became a nun at Dunkirk)

By Barbara Villiers (1641–1709), wife of Roger Palmer, 1st Earl of Castlemaine, and created Duchess of Cleveland in her own right:

- Lady Anne Palmer (Fitzroy) (1661–1722), married Thomas Lennard, 1st Earl of Sussex. She may have been the daughter of Roger Palmer, but Charles accepted her.
- Charles Fitzroy (1662–1730), created Duke of Southampton (1675), became 2nd Duke of Cleveland (1709)
- Henry Fitzroy (1663–1690), created Earl of Euston (1672), Duke of Grafton (1675)
- Charlotte Fitzroy (1664–1717), married Edward Lee, 1st Earl of Lichfield
- George Fitzroy (1665–1716), created Earl of Northumberland (1674), Duke of Northumberland (1678)
- Barbara (Benedicta) Fitzroy (1672–1737) – She was probably the child of John Churchill, later Duke of Marlborough, who was another of Cleveland's many lovers, and was never acknowledged by Charles as his own daughter.

By Nell Gwyn (1650–1687):

- Charles Beauclerk (1670–1726), created Earl of Burford (1676), then Duke of St Albans (1684)
- James, Lord Beauclerk (1671–1680 or 1681)

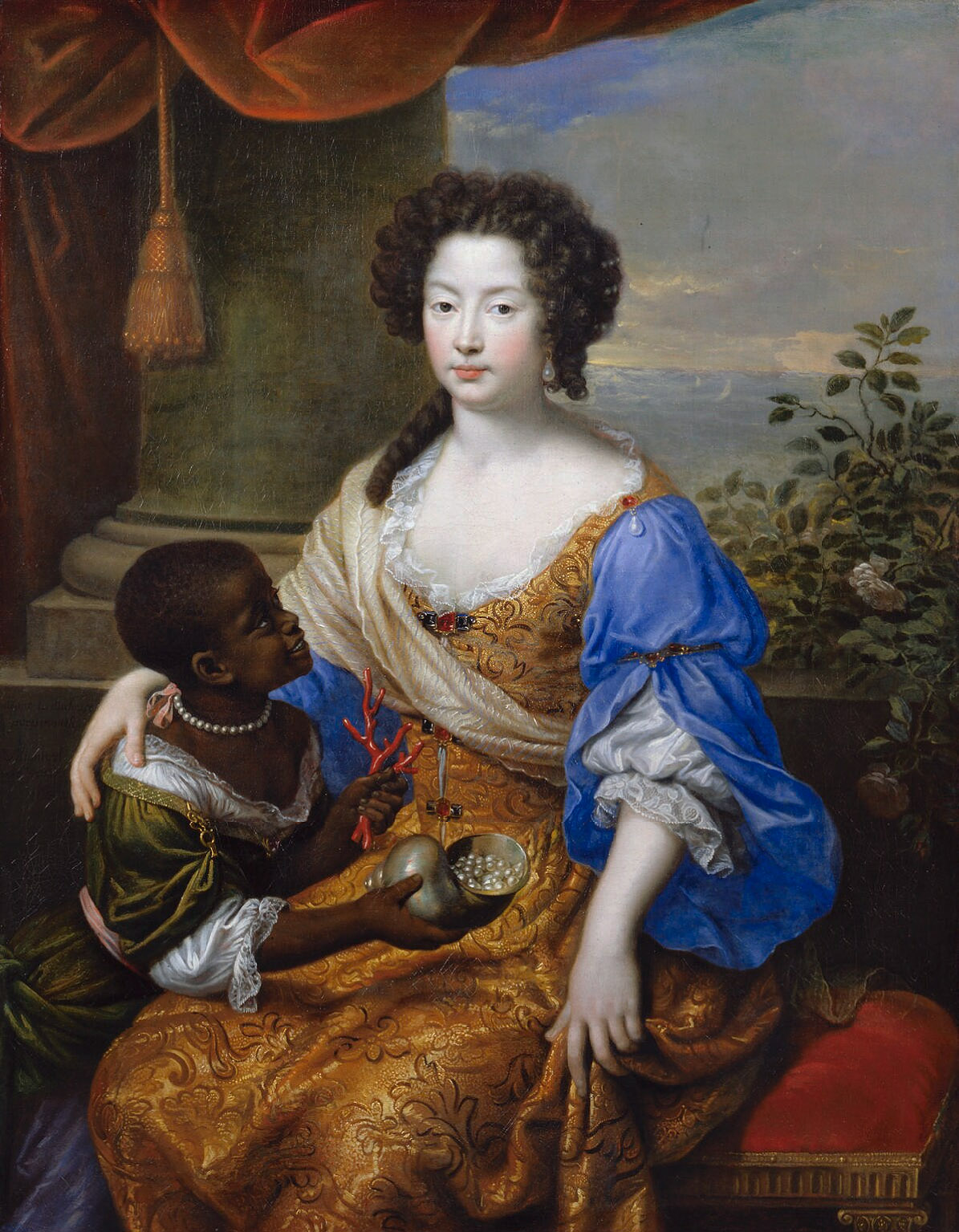
Louise de Kérouaille with unknown attendant, painted in France by Pierre Mignard, 1682

By Louise Renée de Penancoët de Kérouaille (1649–1734), created Duchess of Portsmouth in her own right (1673):

- Charles Lennox (1672–1723), created Duke of Richmond (1675) in England and Duke of Lennox (1675) in Scotland.

By Mary 'Moll' Davis, courtesan and actress of repute:

- Lady Mary Tudor (1673–1726), married Edward Radclyffe, 2nd Earl of Derwentwater; after Edward's death, she married Henry Graham (of Levens), and upon his death she married James Rooke.

Other probable mistresses include:

- Christabella Wyndham
- Hortense Mancini, Duchess of Mazarin
- Winifred Wells – one of Queen Catherine's Maids of Honour
- Jane Roberts – the daughter of a clergyman
- Mrs Knight – a famous singer
- Elizabeth, Countess of Falmouth – the widow of Charles Berkeley, 1st Earl of Falmouth
- Elizabeth Fitzgerald, Countess of Kildare

Letters claiming that Marguerite or Margaret de Carteret bore Charles a son named James de la Cloche in 1646 are dismissed by historians as forgeries.

== Genealogical tables ==
The House of Stuart and their relations

James I of England; 1566–1625	Anne of Denmark; 1574–1619	Henry IV of France; 1553–1610	Marie de' Medici; 1575–1642
Elizabeth; 1596–1662	Charles I of England; 1600–1649	Henrietta Maria of France; 1609–1669	Louis XIII of France; 1601–1643
Rupert of the Rhine; 1619–1682	Sophia of Hanover; 1630–1714	Charles II of England; 1630–1685	Mary; 1631–1660	William II of Orange; 1626–1650	Anne Hyde; 1637–1671	James II of England; 1633–1701	Mary of Modena; 1658–1718	Henrietta; 1644–1670	Philip I of Orléans; 1640–1701	Louis XIV of France; 1638–1715
George I of Great Britain; 1660–1727	William III of England; 1650–1702	Mary II of England; 1662–1694	Anne of Great Britain; 1665–1714	James Francis Edward Stuart; 1688–1766	Marie Louise of Orléans; 1662–1689	Anne Marie of Orléans; 1669–1728

Charles II of England's children

King Charles II; 1630–1685	Queen Catherine; 1638–1705 m. 1662
with Lucy Walter c. 1630–1658	with Elizabeth Killigrew; 1622–1680	with Catherine Pegge b. c. 1635	with Barbara Palmer; 1640–1739; Duchess of Cleveland	with Nell Gwyn; 1650–1687	with Louise de Kérouaille; 1649–1734; Duchess of Portsmouth, Baroness Petersfield, Countess of Fareham	with Moll Davis c. 1648–1708
James Scott; 1649–1685; Duke of Monmouth; Duke of Buccleuch	Charlotte Paston; 1650–1684	Charles FitzCharles; 1657–1680; Earl of Plymouth	(possibly); Anne Palmer (Fitzroy); 1661–1722	Henry FitzRoy; 1663–1690; Duke of Grafton	George FitzRoy; 1665–1716; Duke of Northumberland	Charles Beauclerk; 1670–1726; Earl of Burford; Duke of St Albans	Charles Lennox; 1672–1723; Duke of Richmond; Duke of Lennox	Mary Tudor; 1673-1726
Catherine FitzCharles; 1658–1759?	Charles FitzRoy; 1662–1730; Duke of Cleveland; Duke of Southampton	Charlotte Fitzroy; 1664–1717	(possibly); Barbara FitzRoy; 1672–1737	James, Lord Beauclerk; 1671–1680

== Notes ==
Charles II of England House of Stuart Born: 29 May 1630 Died: 6 February 1685
Regnal titles
Preceded by Charles I	King of Scotland; 1649–1651	Vacant Military government
Vacant English Interregnum Title last held by Charles I	King of England and Ireland; 1660–1685	Succeeded by James II & VII
Vacant Military government	King of Scotland; 1660–1685	Succeeded by James II & VII
British royalty
Vacant Title last held by Charles I	Duke of Cornwall; Duke of Rothesay; 1630–1649	Vacant Title next held by James Francis Edward
Vacant Title last held by Charles I	Prince of Wales; 1638–1649	Vacant Title next held by James Francis Edward
