= Winifred Wells =

Winifred Wells (born circa 1642 - floruit 1692), was a courtier at the Stuart Restoration court as a Maid of Honour to Queen consort Catherine of Braganza. She was also one of the many mistresses of King Charles II of England. Samuel Pepys refers to her as the King's mistress in his diary, and she also features in Philibert de Gramont's famous Mémoirs.

== At the royal court ==
Wells was born about 1642 as the youngest daughter of Gilbert Wells of Twyford, Hampshire. The Wells family members were staunch Royalists during the English Civil War. She came to court early in the reign of King Charles II as she was one of Queen Catherine's original Maids of Honour. She became a mistress to King Charles sometime in 1662. Winifred is referred to in Philbert de Gramont's Mémoirs in which he wrote of her:

"As her father had first served Charles I, she thought it would ill become his daughter to decline to be served by Charles II".

Wells was described by Gramont as having been a "big, splendidly handsome creature who dressed well", with the "carriage of a goddess and the physiognomy of a dreamy sheep"; however, Barbara Villiers, the King's chief mistress, compared her to a goose.

In his diary entry for 8 February 1663, Samuel Pepys reported that it was said that Wells had "dropped a child during a court ball held on 31 December 1662". The child was allegedly fathered by the King. Pepys later went on to record that it was rumoured King Charles had given her £1,500 or £2,000 on 20 February 1663.

Nine years later in September 1672, Charles made her another present of £2,150 as a marriage portion. Sometime before 14 July 1673, she married Thomas Wyndham, one of the King's equerries. Queen Catherine appointed her as a dresser, and she remained in Catherine's service until 1692, seven years after the death of King Charles.
