= Coronation of Charles II of England =

1661 coronation in England

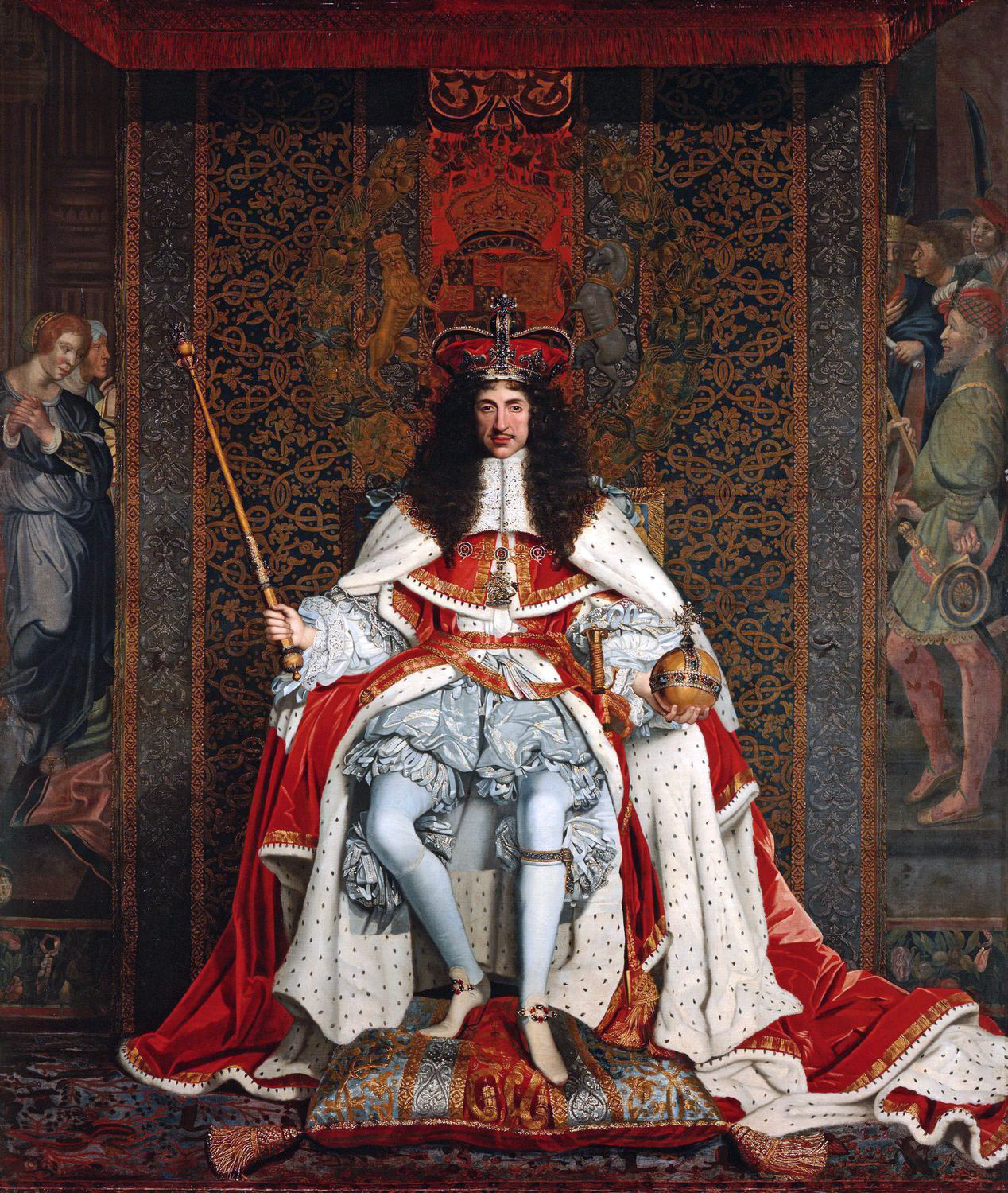
- Charles II enthroned in coronation robes
- Date: 23 April 1661; 365 years ago
- Location: Westminster Abbey, London, England
- Participants: Charles II of England; Great Officers of State; Bishops of the Church of England; Peerage of England

The coronation of Charles II as King of England and Ireland was held on 23 April 1661 (Saint George's Day) at Westminster Abbey. This was the first English coronation to take place after the execution of Charles I, and the subsequent abolition of the monarchy. It was a ceremony of many firsts, including the new regalia made for the coronation after the rule of Oliver Cromwell.

== Preparation ==
Before the coronation, new regalia had to be made for the event as most of the Crown Jewels were broken up and sold by the Protectorate. The cost was over £12,000 (equivalent to £1,944,000 in 2025, adjusted for inflation). Samuel Pepys, who attended the ceremony, detailed the service in his diary. The coronation was the last time the traditional procession from the Tower of London took place. Tiered seating was installed inside the Abbey for the first time, as the Abbey was packed with people, to the point where additional seating was needed so that all of the congregation could view, however, according to first-hand accounts, most people could still not see the ceremony.

== Procession ==
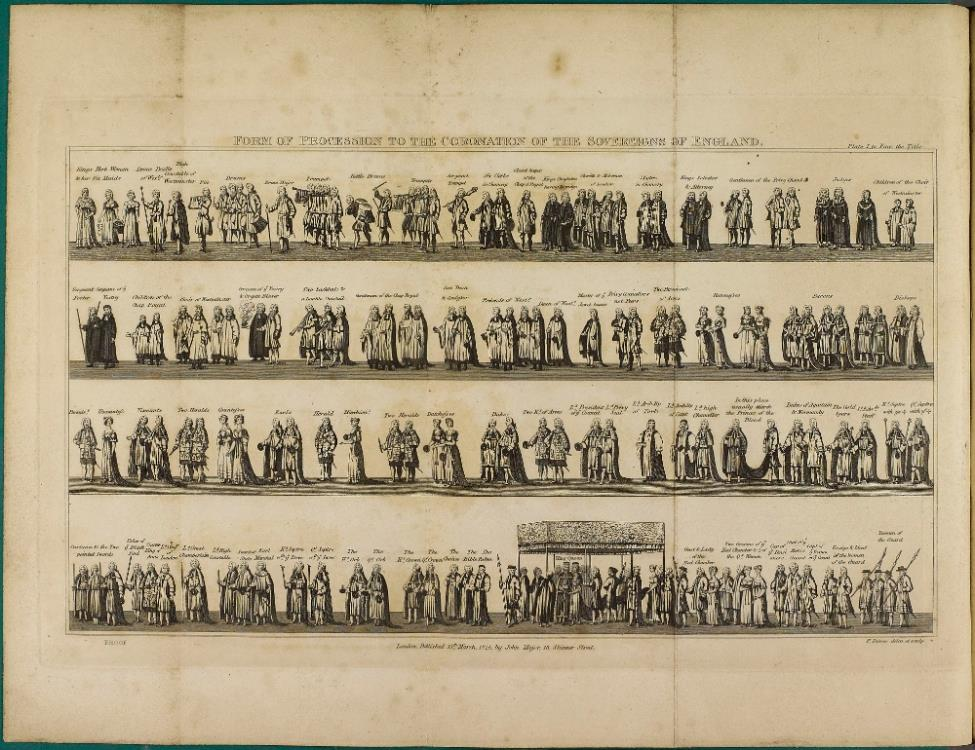
A Circumstantial Account of the Preparations for the Coronation of Charles II, by Sir Edward Walker

Charles travelled from Whitehall to the Tower of London, and finally Westminster Abbey. He had broken tradition by not spending the night before at the Tower. He arrived at the Tower in the early morning, had breakfast, and was ready to travel to Westminster around 10 o'clock.

Accompanied by his nobility, he rode out of the Tower to join the assembled company on Tower Hill and take his place in the procession. On his procession, the streets of London were lined with cheering crowds, the shops and houses hung with bright banners and carpets, and the fountains allegedly "flowing with wine".

== Service ==
Charles entered the Abbey, in his Robe of State, accompanied by the anthem I was glad, based on Psalm 122, a text that had been first used at the coronation of Charles I in 1626. As the King entered the choir, he was greeted with the acclamation; "VIVAT REX CAROLUS"

The recognition and coronation oath followed after, and then the anointing. The regalia were presented to him, including the sceptre and Sword of State being presented to him by his brother, James, Duke of York. Afterwards he was crowned with the newly remade St Edward's Crown, and a group recognition of "God save the King!" was carried out by all of the congregation, peers and clergy.

He was brought up to the Chair of Estate and enthroned, all of the peers are reported to have given their homages. An unprecedented event occurred at the coronation, the Garter King of Arms reportedly walked up the scaffolding and asked the congregation three times "that if any one could show any reason why Charles Stewart [Stuart] should not be King of England, that now he should come and speak." This was the first time that the Crown of England was put up to the legitimacy of the people.

Charles was led out of the Abbey by a procession of clergy and Knights of the Order of the Garter.

== Banquet ==
The banquet after the coronation was held at Westminster Hall and featured a large display of food, including over 70 dishes at the king's table, 7.3 tonnes of meat, and 1,600 chickens. The ceremony helped revive traditions abandoned during the Commonwealth, It involved a grand procession, and included the famous challenge by the King's Champion. New regalia and ceremonial plate, previously sold or melted down, were used for the event.

The cost was about £1,200 (equivalent to £194,000 in 2025, adjusted for inflation), with thousands of spectators and reportedly 24 violins for music. A key event was the entry of the hereditary King's Champion, who rode into the hall on horseback, threw down a gauntlet, and challenged anyone to dispute the king's right to the throne. The original text of the challenge was;

"If any person of what degree soever, high or low, shall deny or gainsay our Soveraigne Lord King Charles the Second, King of England, Scotland, France and Ireland, defender of the faith, Sonne and next heire to our Soveraigne Lord Charles the First, the last King deceased, to be right heire to the Imperiall Crowne of this Realme of England, or that bee ought not to enjoy the same; here is his champion, who sayth that he lyeth and is a false Traytor, being ready in person to combate with him, and in this quarrell will venture his life against him, on what day soever hee shall be appointed.”

After the champion issued the challenge, the king would drink from a golden cup and send it to the champion as a reward.
