= Catherine FitzCharles =

Illegitimate daughter of Charles II of England

- Born: 1658
- Died: 1759 (aged 100–101)
- Father: Charles II of England
- Mother: Catherine Pegge

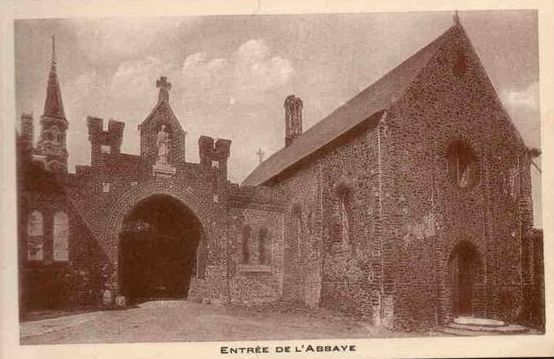
The entrance to Dunkirk Abbey

Catherine FitzCharles (1658–1759) was the illegitimate daughter of Charles II of England and his mistress Catherine Pegge. Her older brother by one year, Charles FitzCharles, was made the 1st Earl of Plymouth by his father. Little is known about Catherine's life, but she is thought to have become a Benedictine nun at Dunkirk Abbey in Dunkirk, France, like many other highborn Englishwomen during the reign of Charles II. She is believed to have resided there under the religious name, Sister Ophelia, until her death in 1759, aged 101. However, the small amount of information available about her has led some to conclude that she died in infancy or early childhood instead.
