= Yeldersley =

Hamlet in Derbyshire, England

Coordinates: 52.990°N 1.684°W

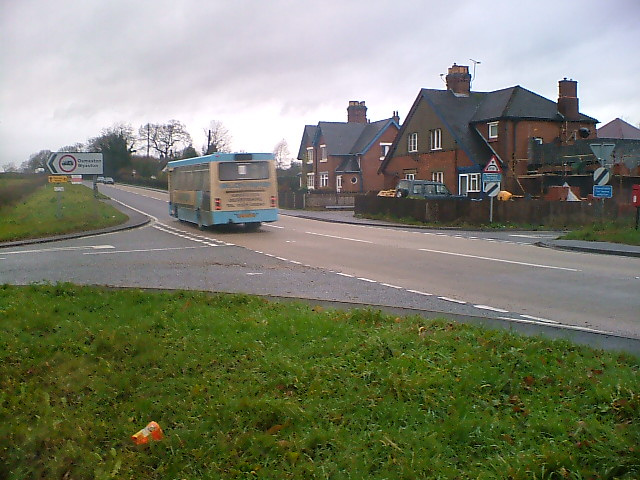
- Cross roads in Yeldersley

- Location within Derbyshire
- OS grid reference: SK213436
- District: Derbyshire Dales
- Shire county: Derbyshire
- Region: East Midlands
- Country: England
- Sovereign state: United Kingdom
- Post town: ASHBOURNE
- Postcode district: DE6
- Police: Derbyshire
- Fire: Derbyshire
- Ambulance: East Midlands

Yeldersley is a manor mentioned in the Domesday Book. It is located near Ashbourne in Derbyshire. Today there is Yeldersley Hall. This hamlet had a population of 200 in 1831. It is about 5 kilometres (3 mi) south of Ashbourne.

== Notable residents ==
Catherine Pegge was born here in the seventeenth century.

== See also ==
- Listed buildings in Yeldersley
