= Yeldersley Hall, Derbyshire =

Country house in Ashbourne, Derbyshire, England

Coordinates: 52.9937°N 1.6893°W

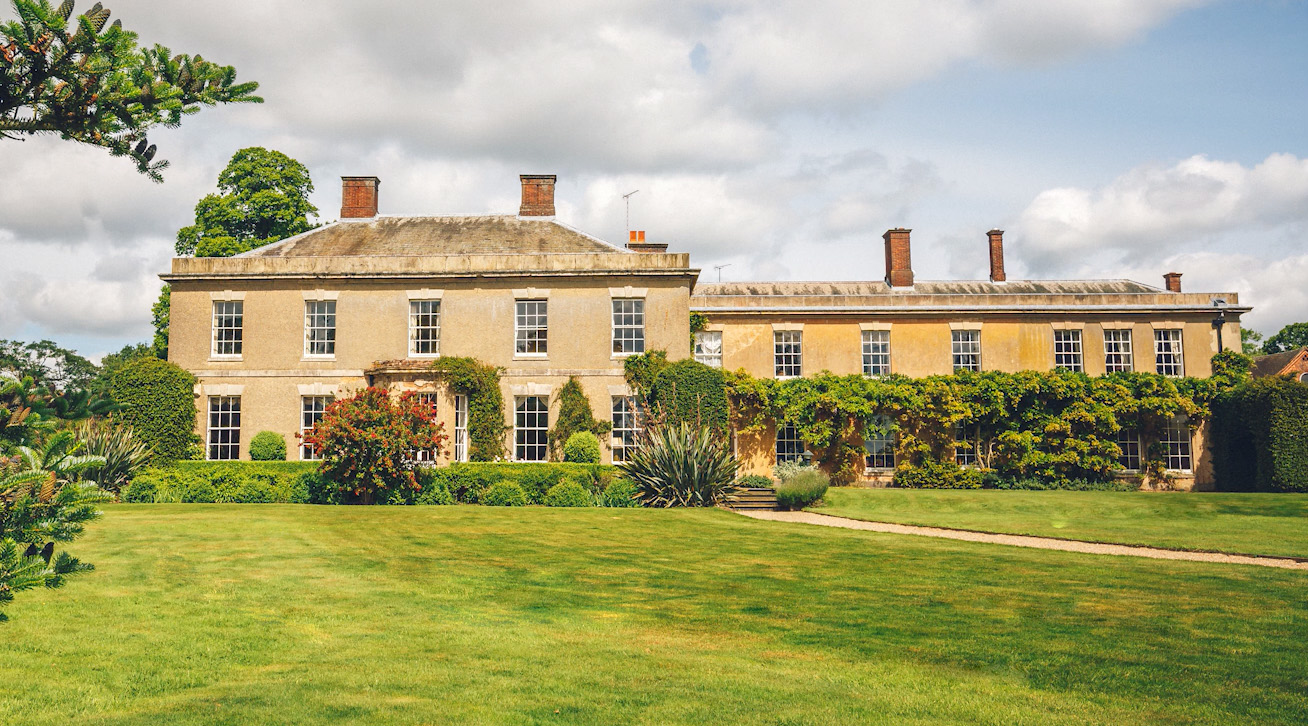
Yeldersley Hall

Yeldersley Hall is a building of historical significance in Ashbourne, Derbyshire, England and is listed on the English Heritage Register. It was built in about 1800 by a wealthy landowner and was the residence of many notable people over the next two centuries. Today it is a venue for special events, particularly weddings.

== The Evans family ==
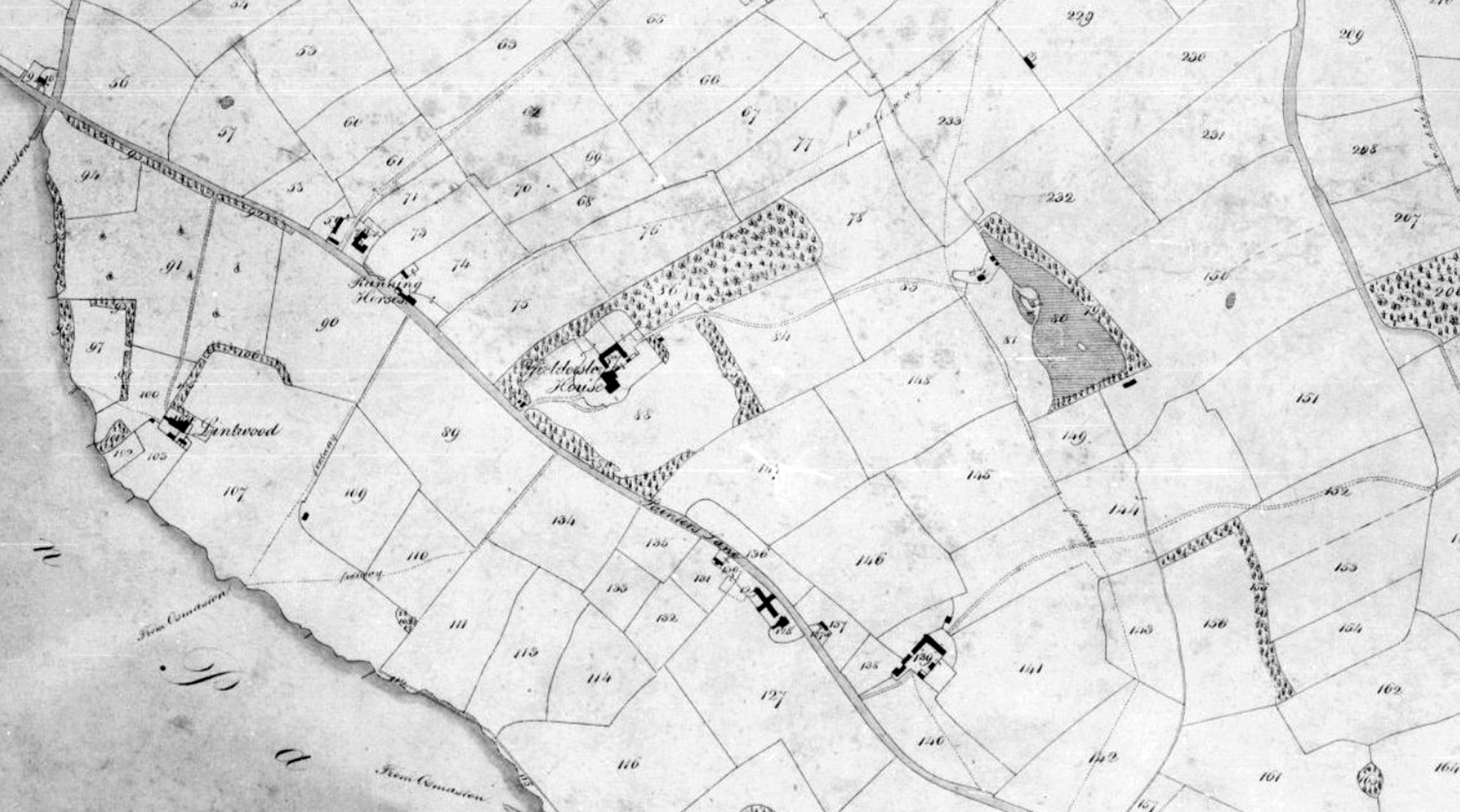
Map Yeldersley Hall 1841

Edmund Evans (1757–1824) built Yeldersley Hall in about 1800. He was the son of Thomas Evans (1723–1814) a banker and founder of Darley Abbey Mills. In 1783 he married Dorothy Coles, only child of Francis Coles of Birmingham and for some years they lived in Derby.

The couple had three children but only one, Elizabeth, survived to adulthood. She became a wealthy heiress as she inherited a large part of the Snelston Estate from her great-uncle as well as her father's property which included Yeldersley Hall when he died in 1824.

In 1813 she married John Harrison, a lawyer and so the control of Yeldersley Hall effectively passed to him after 1824 due to the legal position relating to the property of married women. He built a large house in Snelston and therefore did not live at the Hall. Instead, it was rented to wealthy tenants for many years. In 1840, Mrs Maria Butler, the widow of Ralph Butler a gentleman of Lancaster, was the tenant. By 1850 the Reverend Roger Ryland Vaughton rented the house. He is recorded in the 1851 England Census as living there with his wife Elizabeth, two daughters and three servants. He remained at the Hall until about 1861 when the house was sold to the Wright family.

== The Wright family ==
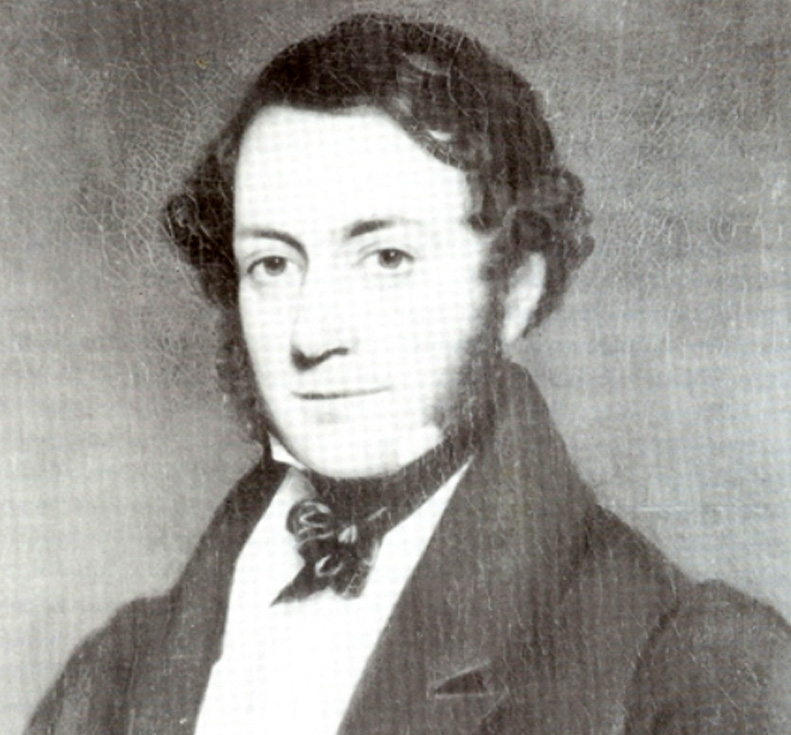
Francis Wright

Francis Wright (1806–1873) bought Yeldersley Hall in 1861 for the use of his family. Francis was born in 1806. His father was John Wright, a wealthy landowner and part owner of the Butterley Company. Francis joined the firm and under his direction it grew to the largest coal and iron firm in the East Midlands. In 1830 he had married Selina Fitzherbert (1806–1888), daughter of Sir Henry Fitzherbert, 3rd Baronet.

His father died in 1840 and left Francis a large fortune. In 1846 he commenced the construction of a huge mansion near Ashbourne called “Osmaston Manor” which became the family's main residence. The couple had six sons and six daughters, several of whom lived at Yeldesley Hall. The 1871 Census shows the eldest son John living there with his family and fourteen servants. When Francis died in 1873 his wife Selina moved into the house with her unmarried daughter Judith. It seems that Francis left Yeldersley Hall to Sarah in his will. When Sarah died in 1888, Judith continued to live at the house until her death in 1903. Judith was regarded as a great benefactor and her obituary in a local newspaper outlined her many donations to charitable institutions.

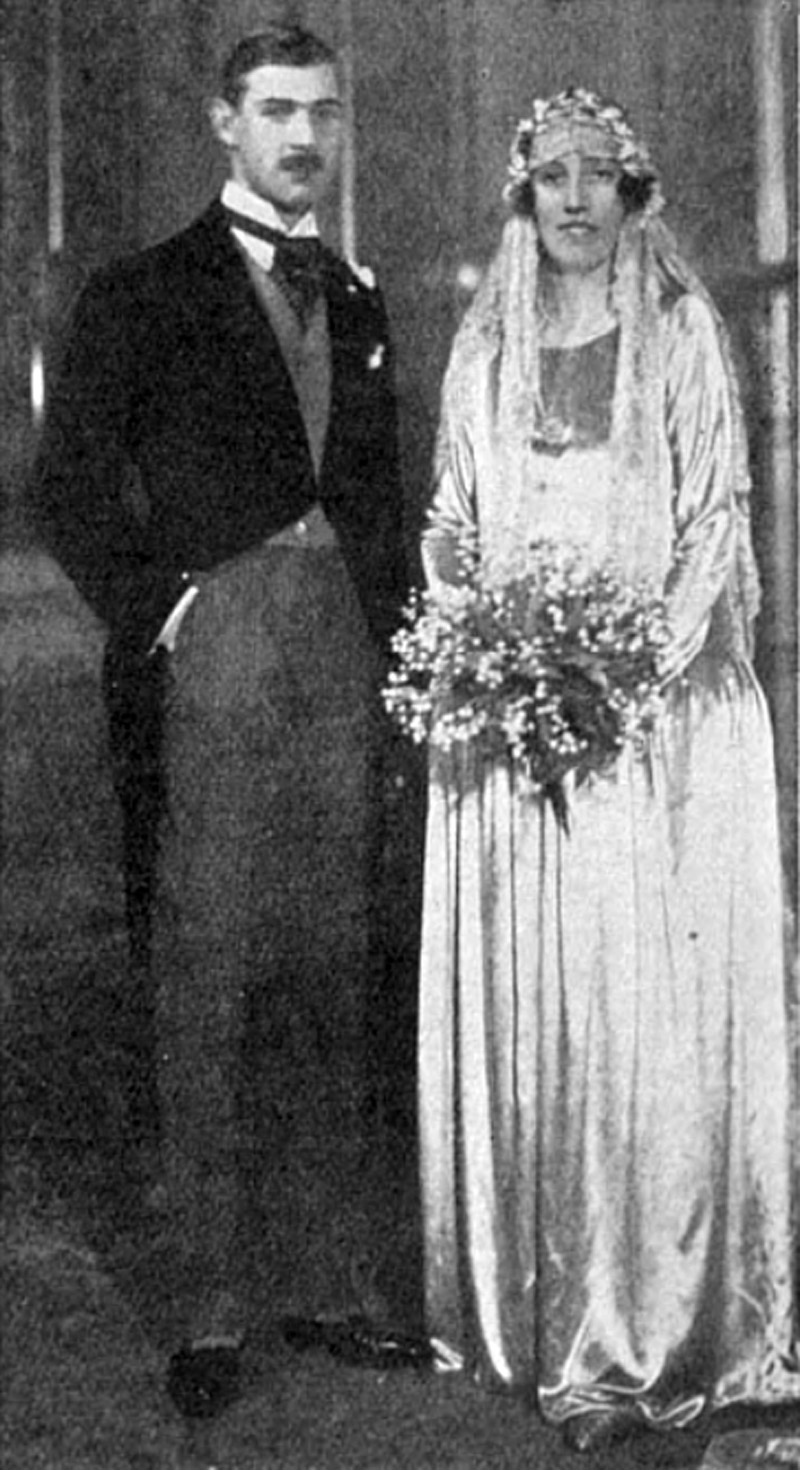
Fitzherbert Wright and Doreen Wingfield, grandparents of the Duchess of York

By 1912 Henry Fitzherbert Wright (1870–1947), the grandson of Francis Wright, was the owner of the property. Henry had been born in 1870 and was the son of Fitzherbert Wright (1841–1910). He was educated at Eton and Cambridge and became a lawyer. He later joined the family business, the Butterley Company. He was also an alderman on the Derbyshire Council for many years and a Member of Parliament. In 1894 he married Muriel Harriet Fletcher (1873–1953) and they had two sons and six daughters. They are both shown in the photograph below at Yeldersley Hall with some of their grandchildren.

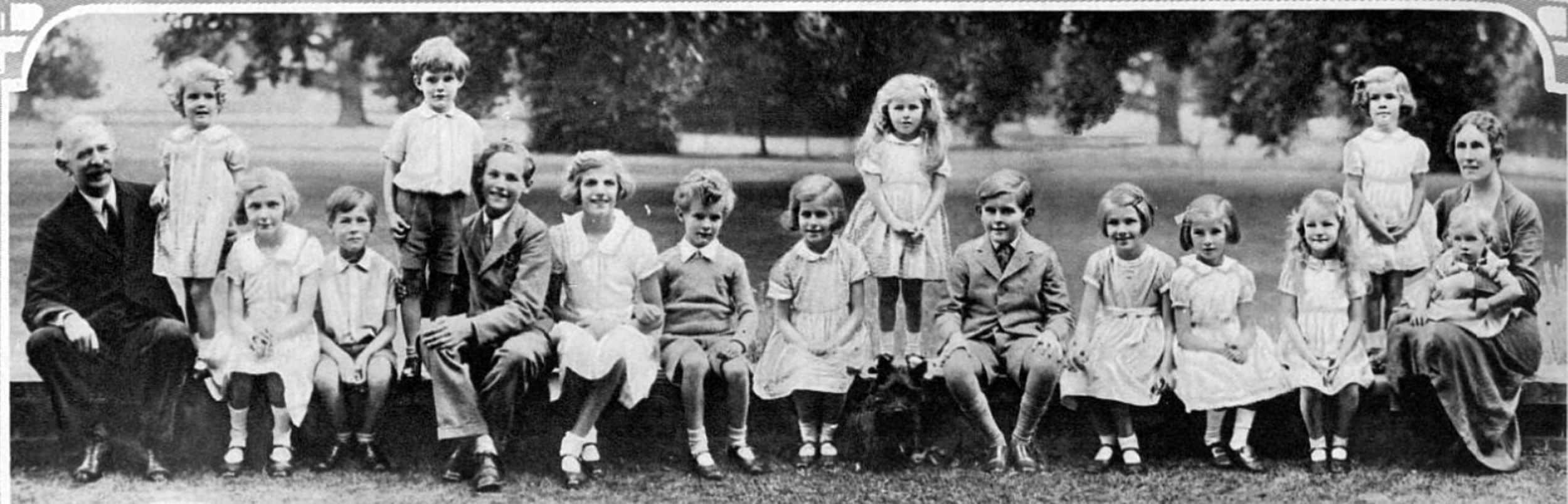
Henry Fitzherbert Wright (1870–1947), his wife and some of their grandchildren at Yeldersley Hall in 1936

Their eldest son Fitzherbert Wright (1905–1975), who spent his childhood at the Hall, was a grandfather of Sarah Ferguson. He was married in 1928 to Doreen Wingfield, the daughter of the 8th Viscount of Powerscourt. Their wedding photograph is shown. They had four children, the youngest of whom was Susan Barrantes.

Henry's youngest daughter was Muriel Joyce Wright (1909–1944) whom many have claimed is Ian Fleming's original Bond girl. The writer John Craig says:

"The Bond girl celebrated in each of the Bond films was the model of a real Fleming girlfriend Muriel Wright. Wright was a model skier and equestrian with an unconventional flair for living. Wright was engaged to Fleming for a while but it was broken off when Fleming was unable to curtail his hedonistic lifestyle."

When Henry died in 1947 Yeldersley Hall was sold to Clarence Arnold Fell, a consulting engineer. He lived there until his death in 1974.

== See also ==
- Listed buildings in Yeldersley
