= List of governors of Tangier =

This is a list of governors of Tangier during the period when it was under European control (1471–1684).

== Portuguese Tangier (1471–1661) ==
Tenure	Incumbent	Notes
28 August 1471 to 1484?	Rodrigo Afonso de Melo, 1st Count of Olivença, Governor	Took possession following the Conquest of Asilah.
1484? to 1486	Manuel de Melo, Count of Olivença, Governor	
1486 to 1489	João de Meneses, 1st Count of Tarouca, Governor	1st Term.
1487 to 1489	Fernão Martins Mascarenhas, Interim Governor	
1489 to 1490	Manuel Pessanha, Interim Governor	
1490? to 1501	Lopo Vaz de Azevedo, Governor	
1501 to 1508	João de Meneses, 1st Count of Tarouca, Governor	2nd Term.
1508 to 1521	Duarte de Menezes, Governor	1st Term.
1521 to 1522	Henrique de Meneses, Governor	
1522 to 1533	Duarte de Meneses, from Évora, Governor	
1533 to 1536	Gonçalo Mendes Sacoto, Governor	
1536 to 1539	Duarte de Menezes, Governor	2nd Term.
1539 to 1546	João de Meneses, Governor	
1546 to 1548	Francisco Botelho, Governor	
1548 to 1550	Pedro de Meneses, Governor	
1550 to 1552	João Álvares de Azevedo, Governor	
1552 to 1553	Luís de Loureiro, Governor	
1553	Fernando de Menezes, Governor	
1553 to 1554	Luís da Silva de Meneses, Governor	
1554 to 1564	Bernardim de Carvalho, Governor	
1564 to 1566	Lourenço de Távora, Governor	
15 July 1566 to 1 August 1572	João de Meneses, Governor	
1572 to 1573	Rui de Carvalho, Governor	
1573 to 1574	Diogo Lopes da Franca, Governor	
1574 to 15 August 1574	António of Portugal, Governor	
1574 to 1578	Duarte de Meneses, Viceroy of Portuguese India, Governor	
1578 to September 1578	Pedro da Silva, Governor	
7 September 1578 to 25 July 1581	Jorge de Mendonça, Governor	Last Governor nominated by the Portuguese Crown before the Iberian Union.
25 July 1581 to 1590	Francisco de Almeida, Governor	
1590 to June 1591	Belchior da França and Simão Lopes de Mendonça, Governors	
17 June 1591 to 24 August 1599	Aires de Saldanha, Governor	
24 August 1599 to 22 September 1605	António Pereira Lopes de Berredo, Governor	
22 September 1605 to March 1610	Nuno de Mendonça, Governor	
March 1610 to June 1614	Afonso de Noronha, Governor	
June 1614 to October 1614	Luís de Meneses, 2nd Count of Tarouca, Governor	
October 1614 to August 1615	Luís de Noronha, Governor	
August 1615 to 22 December 1616	João Coutinho, 5th Count of Redondo, Governor	
22 December 1616 to 1 July 1617	André Dias da França, Governor	
1 July 1617 to 1621	Pedro Manuel, Governor	
1621 to 13 March 1622	André Dias da França, Governor	
13 March 1622 to July 1624	Jorge de Mascarenhas, Marquis of Montalvão, Governor	
July 1624 to 14 May 1628	Miguel de Noronha, 4th Count of Linhares, Governor	
14 May 1628 to 18 June 1628	Galaaz Fernandes da Silveira, Governor	
18 June 1628 to 1637	Fernando de Mascarenhas, Count of Torre, Governor	
15 April 1637 to 24 August 1643	Rodrigo Lobo da Silveira, Governor	
1643 to 16 April 1645	André Dias da França, Governor	
16 April 1645 to 20 November 1649	Caetano Coutinho, Governor	
20 November 1649 to January 1653	Luís Lobo, Baron of Alvito, Governor	
January 1653 to 7 March 1656	Rodrigo de Lencastre, Governor	
7 March 1656 to 1661	Fernando de Meneses, 2nd Count of Ericeira, Governor	
1661 to 29 January 1662	Luís de Almeida, 1st Count of Avintes Governor	
23 June 1661	Awarded to Charles II by the Marriage Treaty	

== English Tangier (1661–1684) ==
Tenure	Incumbent	Notes
29 January 1662 to 9 May 1663	Henry Mordaunt, Earl of Peterborough, Governor	
10 May 1663 1663 to 4 May 1664	Andrew Rutherford, Earl of Teviot, Governor	Killed in action in the Battle of Tangier.
4 May 1664 to 1664	Sir Tobias Bridge, Acting Governor	
1664 to April 1665	John Fitzgerald, Governor	
April 1665 to 1666	John, Baron Belasyse, Governor	
1666 to 1669	Sir Henry Norwood, Governor	
1669 to 1670	John Middleton, Earl of Middleton, Governor	1st Term.
1670 to 1672	Sir Hugh Chomondeley, Acting Governor	
1672 to July 1674	John Middleton, Earl of Middleton, Governor	2nd Term.
July 1674 to March 1675	Vacant	
March 1675 to 1680	William O'Brien, 2nd Earl of Inchiquin, Governor	
1680 to 1680	Palmes Fairborne, Governor	
1680 to 1680	Thomas Butler, 6th Earl of Ossory, Appointed Governor	Died after appointment but before taking up position.
1680 to October 1680	Charles FitzCharles, 1st Earl of Plymouth, Governor	Died soon after taking up position as Governor.
October 1680 to 28 December 1681	Edward Sackville, Acting Governor	
28 December 1681 to 1683	Sir Percy Kirke, Governor	
1683 to 6 February 1684	George Legge, Admiral Lord Dartmouth, Governor	
6 February 1684	Re-incorporated into Morocco	

== See also ==
- Timeline of Tangier
- Tangier Garrison
- Tangier Regiment
- 2nd Tangier Regiment
- European enclaves in North Africa before 1830
- List of rulers of the Tangier International Zone
