= Battle of Tangier (1675) =

1675 battle between Morocco and England

Date	19 September 1675
Location	English Tangier, North Africa
Result	Moroccan victory

Belligerents
Morocco	England

Commanders and leaders
Omar bin Haddu; Hamet	Palmes Fairborne; Sir Robert Napier †; Sir Marmaduke Boynton

Strength
2,000 men	500 men

Casualties and losses
Unknown	150 killed and wounded

The Battle of Tangier in 1675 was an engagement between the Moroccans and the English garrison of Tangier, who raided the vicinity for cattle. The English raid ended in a fiasco.

== Background ==
After the Moroccan victories in 1662 and 1664, the conflict between the English and the Moors continued. Throughout 1670 and 1671, the Moors kept setting up ambushes of haymakers and those who wandered far away from the town. The Moroccans were able to deliver surprise attacks. Due to constant attack, garrison supplies and storage were waning, and an attempt to buy meat from Portugal and Spain ended in vain. The governor of Tangier, William O'Brien, 2nd Earl of Inchiquin, decided in the Council of War to fetch some cattle from outside based on reports by a Moroccan spy, Hamet, who recommended such an idea.

== Battle ==
On the night of September 19, 1675, the governor prepared a force of 500 men commanded by Major Palmes Fairborne to bring the cattle. Fairborne divided his troops into three divisions. A force of 100 men led by Sir Robert Napier served as the vanguard, and another 100 were under Sir Marmaduke Boynton. The Moroccan spy informed the Moroccan sultan's commander, Omar bin Haddu, of the upcoming force. At 9:00 PM, the English force left the town, advanced, and posted itself on a hill to the west of Anne's fort.

Fairborne then dispatched the vanguard to capture the cattle; however, it was discovered that there were none. The Moroccan spy has led the force into an ambush; hundreds of gunshots encompassed by hundreds of cavalry were attacking the English, who were confused and lost. The English cavalry had no time to organize, and the force was inexperienced. As soon as Fariborne heard the firing, he hastily retreated to Anne's fort, where Boynton was waiting; however, he was attacked by a force of 2,000 Moroccans led by Hamet.

Fairborne formed a square formation and successfully fended off Moroccan attacks until he reached the fort. Upon arriving at the fort, Boynoton was nowhere to be found. He most likely retreated back to the fort and informed the governor of the disaster. Fairborne organized his forces and marched to the hill, hoping to find any remaining survivors from the vanguard. He remained there for a quarter of an hour but was forced to retreat after a force of 1,500 Moroccans arrived to face him.

== Aftermath ==
Fairborne Division lost 10 killed and several wounded; however, the vanguard was totally lost. The disastrous raid ended in 150 casualties for the English garrison, which was already depleted. Fairborne complained to Lords Commissioners about the actions of Earl of Inchiquin, who acted on false information and that he exposed his men to the dangers. The commissioners disapproved of Inchiquin's actions and removed him from his post.

== See also ==
- Battle of Tangier (1662)
- Battle of Tangier (1664)
- Great Siege of Tangier

== Sources ==
- John Childs (2013), Army of Charles II.
- Karim Bejjit (2015), English Colonial Texts on Tangier, 1661-1684, Imperialism and the Politics of Resistance.
- John Hawkins (2023), Tangier, The Earliest Battle Honour.
