= Battle of Tangier (1662) =

1662 battle between Morocco and England

Date	3 May 1662
Location	English Tangier, North Africa
Result	Moroccan victory

Belligerents
Morocco	England

Commanders and leaders
Khadir Ghaïlan	Nathaniel Fines †

Strength
5,000 men	500 men

Casualties and losses
Unknown	300 killed

The Battle of Tangier in 1662 was the first major engagement between Moroccan forces, led by Khadir Ghaïlan, and the English garrison, led by Nathaniel Fiennes. The Moroccans routed the English force.

== Background ==
After the English arrived in January 1662, the Moroccan warlord Khadir Ghaïlan disapproved of the English occupation, considering Tangier as part of his territory. Although he did not have a sufficient army to oust the English, he initiated small ambushes and raids. On March 24, Ghailan and the Earl of Peterborough concluded a truce, providing 50 barrels of powder to the Moroccans. However, Ghailan later discovered that the English were exploiting the truce to expand their colony by seizing nearby lands and building forts. Ghailand considered this a violation of the truce and protested to the English. Receiving no response, he decided to confront them.

== Battle ==
In April 1662, Ghailand arrived in Tangier with an army of 5,000 troops, attempting to draw the garrison out of the fort for a battle. On May 3, an English force of 500 men led by Major Nathaniel Fiennes left the fort with the intention of driving the Moroccans from the city. The English successfully pushed back the Moroccans, but they pursued the retreating enemy too far from the fort and were ambushed at Jews River, west of the fort. Surrounded on three sides, the English suffered heavy losses and were forced to fight their way back to Tangier. Approximately one-third of the English force survived the battle to return to the fort; their commander, Nathaniel Fiennes, was killed. The English lacked knowledge of the Moroccan forces and their positions.

== Aftermath ==
The English suffered a serious setback, which lowered the garrison's morale. The city gates were shut, preventing any English soldiers from leaving the town. This allowed the Moroccans to seize the cattle under the walls. The English governor, Peterborough, was removed from his post and replaced by Andrew Rutherford. However, Andrew repeated the same mistake made by Nathaniel in the Battle of Tangier (1664).

== See also ==
- Battle of Tangier (1664)
- Battle of Tangier (1675)
- Great Siege of Tangier

== Sources ==
- John Childs (2013), Army of Charles II.
- Edward P Beckmann (2013), The English occupation of Tangier (1662–1684), Part 1.
- Enid M. G. Routh (1912), Tangier, England's Lost Atlantic Outpost, 1661-1684.
- G. Stanivukovic (2007), Remapping the Mediterranean World in Early Modern English Writings.
- Richard Hamilton (2019), Tangier, From the Romans to the Rolling Stones.
- David G. Chandler & Ian Frederick William Beckett (1996), The Oxford History of the British Army
