= A View of Tangier =

Painting by Hendrick Danckerts

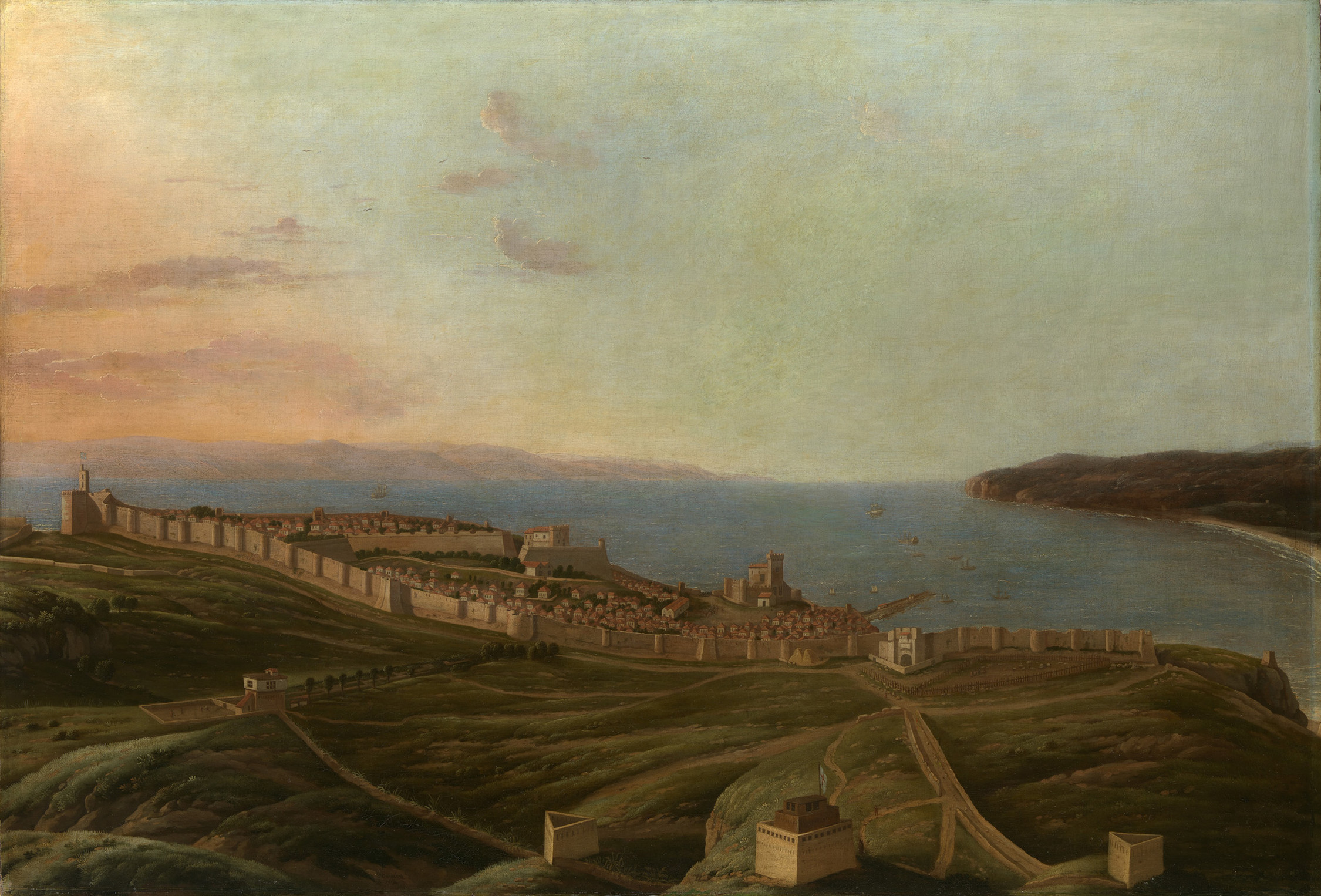
- Artist: Hendrick Danckerts
- Year: 1669
- Type: Oil on canvas, landscape painting
- Dimensions: 110 cm × 160.5 cm (43 in × 63.2 in)
- Location: Royal Collection

A View of Tangier is a 1669 landscape painting by the Dutch artist Hendrick Danckerts. It captures a view of English Tangier on the Mediterranean coast of Morocco. Charles II had acquired the exclave of Tanger from Portugal with the 1661 Marriage Treaty to Catherine of Braganza. It was defended by the Tangier Garrison and saw several major actions such as the Battle of Tangier and the Great Siege of Tangier.

It represents a topographical view of the town and the fortifications that protected it. The painting was commissioned by Charles, possible so he could discuss the defences of his possession without ever having visited it. According to Pepys the Earl of Sandwich described it "as being the truest picture that ever he saw in his life".

In 1684 the English withdrew from Tangier, deciding the cost didn't justify the benefits of the colony and demolished the fortifications seen in the painting. The picture therefore provides a historical record for the layout of the city and remains part of the Royal Collection today.

== Bibliography ==
- Blunt, Anthony. The Pictures in the Collection of Her Majesty the Queen: The Tudor, Stuart and early Georgian Pictures. Phaidon, 1963.
- Clayton, Martin. Charles II: Art & Power. Royal Collection, 2018.
- Hall, Michael. Art, Passion & Power: The Story of the Royal Collection. Ebury Publishing, 2017.
- Latham, Robert (ed.) The Illustrated Pepys: Extracts from the Diary. University of California Press, 1983.
