= Tobias Bridge =

Sir Tobias Bridge fought for Parliament in the English Civil War, and served the Lord Protector Oliver Cromwell during the Interregnum. After the Restoration, he served King Charles II. During the Civil War he served under Thomas Fairfax and George Monck and was noted for his success in Scotland. He governed Cheshire, Lancashire and Staffordshire during the Rule of the Major-Generals and later in the garrison at Dunkirk. Following the restoration he served in the Tangier Garrison, rising to the position of acting governor and being commended for defending it from attack by the Moors. In 1666 Bridge was posted to Barbados and captured the island of Tobago during the Third Anglo-Dutch War. He is thought to have died at Bridgetown, which is named for him.

== Civil War ==
Tobias Bridge was the son of John Bridge of Hatfield Broad Oak, a merchant taylor. During the English Civil War he fought for Parliament as a captain under Thomas Fairfax. During the Interregnum, he was an active supporter of Oliver Cromwell served on several influential committees. He was promoted to major by 1649 and served with unit of dragoons in Scotland before 1653 and was noted for his victories against irregular Scottish forces. By 1654 he enjoyed the patronage of General George Monck, commander in chief of Scotland. He later acted as a major-general (or possibly a deputy major-general) in England. From 1655 and 1659, he was a Colonel of Horse, and on the death of Charles Worsley, he succeeded to the governorship of Cheshire, Lancashire and Staffordshire district during the second half of 1656 Rule of the Major-Generals.

== Dunkirk and Tangier ==
During the Second Commonwealth, in the immediate prelude to the restoration of the monarchy, he served as a major in Sir Lord Lockhart's Regiment of Horse at Dunkirk, and after the restoration, he was appointed Captain of Horse at Dunkirk, a post where he took direct orders from the Governor of Dunkirk and King Charles II. He held the post until 1662 when Dunkirk was sold to France. On his return from Dunkirk, he was commissioned into the Duke of Richmond's Regiment as a captain.

Bridge served in the Tangier Garrison of the North African territory that Charles II was granted as part of the Marriage Treaty in 1661. He was commander of three troops of horse there before assuming government of the post, with Henry Norwood, following the death of Andrew Rutherford, 1st Earl of Teviot at the 1664 Battle of Tangier. He was commended for his actions in defending the post against attacks by the Moors and received one of the first English medals.

== Barbados ==
A year after he was knighted in 1666, Bridge went to Barbados as colonel of his regiment. In February the following year he was commissioned by Charles II to raise the Barbados Regiment of Foot, of which he was appointed colonel. In 1673, he commanded the local land forces against the Baron of Tobago in one of the many wars over that island. In 1674, after victory in Tobago, he was admitted to the council of Barbados. He probably died in Bridgetown, a town named after him and the capital of Barbados.
