= Governor Kirke =

Governor Kirke may refer to:

- David Kirke (c. 1597–1654), Governor of Newfoundland from 1638 to 1651
- Percy Kirke (c. 1646–1691), Governor of Tangier from 1681 to 1683
