= Percy Kirke =

English Army officer, courtier and politician (1646–1691)

Lieutenant-General Percy Kirke
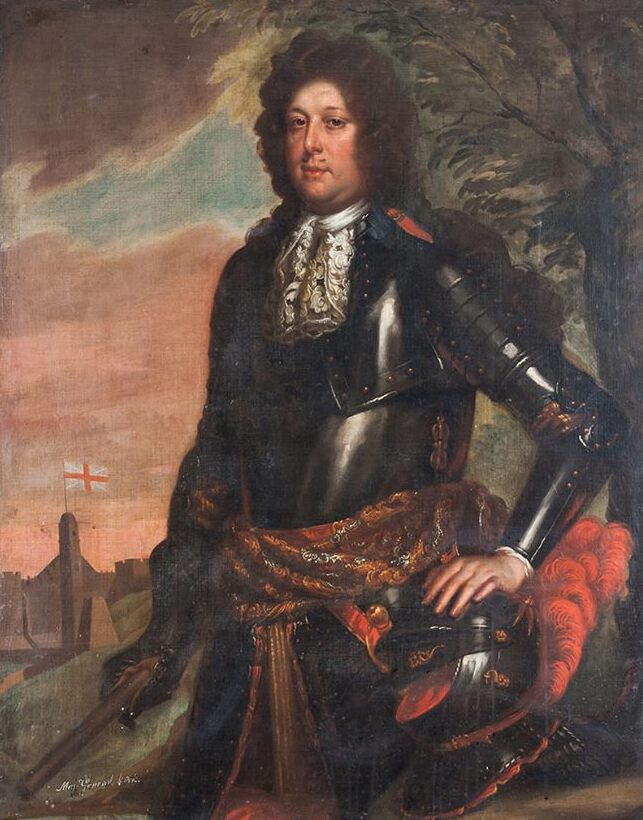
- c. 1680 portrait
- Born: c. 1646
- Died: 31 October 1691 (aged 44–45); Brussels, Spanish Netherlands
- Military career
- Allegiance: England
- Branch: English Army
- Service years: 1666–1691
- Rank: Lieutenant-general
- Units: Duke of York and Albany's Maritime Regiment of Foot; Royal Horse Guards
- Commands: 2nd Tangier Regiment; Tangier Regiment
- Conflicts: Franco-Dutch War; Siege of Maastricht (1673); Monmouth Rebellion; Battle of Sedgemoor; Nine Years' War; 1688 invasion of England; Williamite War in Ireland; Siege of Derry; Capture of Waterford

Lieutenant-General Percy Kirke (c. 1646 – 31 October 1691) was an English Army officer, courtier and Tory politician who represented West Looe in the House of Commons of England from 1689 to 1690. He served in the Franco-Dutch War, Monmouth Rebellion, Williamite War in Ireland and Nine Years' War.

== Life ==
Percy Kirke was born in c. 1646. He was commissioned into the English Army's Duke of York and Albany's Maritime Regiment of Foot in 1666, and subsequently transferred to the Royal Horse Guards. In 1673 Kirke joined the British brigade which was sent to fight in French service as part of the during the Franco-Dutch War, and served under the Duke of Monmouth at the siege of Maastricht along with serving under Turenne in two of the latter's campaigns on the Rhine. In 1680 he was promoted to lieutenant colonel and soon afterwards was made colonel of the 2nd Tangier Regiment. In 1682 Kirke was appointed as the governor of Tangier and colonel of the Tangier Regiment. He visited Meknes in the same year, and in the city Ismail Ibn Sharif as a gesture of goodwill freed one of his English slaves and delivered him to Kirke.

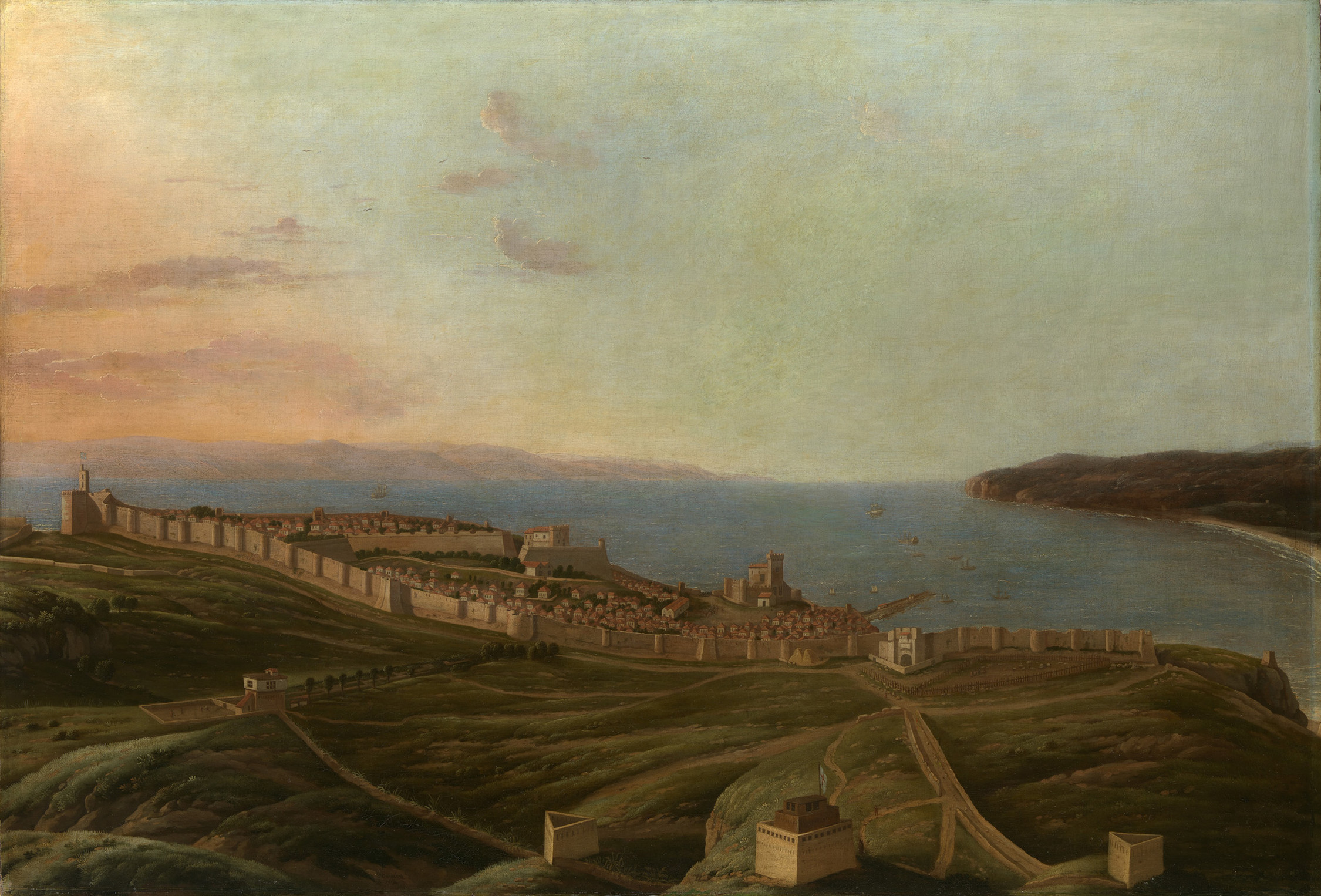
A View of Tangier by Hendrick Danckerts, 1669

In the view of the English historian Thomas Babington Macaulay, Kirke was "a military adventurer whose vices had been developed by the worst of all schools, Tangier... Within the ramparts of his fortress he was a despotic prince. The only check on his tyranny was the fear of being called to account by a distant and a careless government. He might therefore safely proceed to the most audacious excesses of rapacity, licentiousness, and cruelty. He lived with boundless dissoluteness, and procured by extortion the means of indulgence."

Kirke commanded his regiment at the Battle of Sedgemoor on 6 July 1685 during the Monmouth Rebellion before ruthlessly hunting down rebels after the battle. During the Glorious Revolution three years later, Kirke did not put up a strong defence against William of Orange's 1688 invasion of England and quickly defected to William, who promoted him as a reward. In 1689, Kirke was sent to Ireland as part of the Williamite War in Ireland and commanded the Williamite relief force which broke the Jacobite Irish Army's siege of Derry. Following the Battle of the Boyne on 1 July 1690, he oversaw the capture of Waterford, Ireland's second largest settlement at the time, on 25 July 1690. Kirke took part in his last campaign in Flanders in 1691 during the Nine Years' War.

In 1689, Kirke was appointed a Groom of the Bedchamber to William, serving in the office until his death. He also served as MP for West Looe as a Tory from 1689 to 1690. Kirke died at the rank of lieutenant-general in Brussels on 31 October 1691. His eldest son, Percy Kirke, following his father into a career of military service.

== Bibliography ==
- Claudio, Vicki, ed. (2012). A Pastoral Letter to the Captives. Exagorazo Press. ISBN 978-1441417930.

Military offices
Preceded by Sir Edward Sackville	Governor of Tangier; 1681–1683	Succeeded by George Legge, Admiral Lord Dartmouth
Preceded by Sir Palmes Fairborne	Colonel of the Tangier Regiment; 1682–1691	Succeeded by William Selwyn
