= Stafford Fairborne (Royalist) =

English landowner and soldier

Sir Stafford Fairborne was an English landowner and soldier of the seventeenth century.

Born in Newark, he served as a colonel in the Royalist Army of Charles I during the English Civil War. He was the father of the army officer and Governor of Tangier Sir Palmes Fairborne, and the grandfather of the Admiral Stafford Fairborne, who was named after him.

== Bibliography ==
- Cornelius Brown. History of Newark-on-Trent: Volume II. Whiles, 1907.
