= John Fitzgerald (governor) =

17th-century Irish soldier

Sir John Fitzgerald was an Irish soldier of the seventeenth century, best known for serving as Governor of Tangier during the 1660s. He commanded the Tangier Garrison during this time. He later participated in the Williamite War in Ireland (1689–91) on the Jacobite side.

== Continental service ==
Fitzgerald was a Roman Catholic. Following the Cromwellian conquest of Ireland, he went into exile in Continental Europe. He commanded a regiment of Irish exiles in the service of Charles II, serving alongside the Spanish Army at the Battle of the Dunes in 1658. He became known for his connections with Charles' younger brother James, Duke of York. Following the Restoration in 1660, the regiment marched to the English-held fortress at Dunkirk.

== Tangier ==
As Charles had acquired Tangier in the Mediterranean from Portugal in the Marriage Treaty, it was decided to bring Fitzgerald's and another Irish regiment under Lisagh Farrell to form the garrison at Tangier. At the time the Penal Laws against Catholics meant that the regiments couldn't join either the Irish Army or English Army.

The garrison reached Tangier in 1662. The following year the Governor Andrew Rutherford, 1st Earl of Teviot amalgamated the two Irish regiment's under Fizgerald's command. After Teviot's death during the Battle of Tangier against the Moors in 1664, he was temporarily replaced by Tobias Bridge. Fitzgerald was then formally appointed as governor. During his time in Tangier, Fitzgerald fought a duel with a fellow officer Palmes Fairborne.

== Bibliography ==
- Childs, John. The Army of Charles II. Routledge, 1976.
