= Governor Fitzgerald =

Governor Fitzgerald may refer to:

- Charles Fitzgerald (1791–1887), Governor of The Gambia from 1844 to 1847 and Governor of Western Australia from 1848 to 1855
- Frank Fitzgerald (1885–1939), Governor of Michigan from 1935 to 1939
- John Fitzgerald (governor), Governor of Tangier during the 1660s
