= Great Siege of Tangier =

1680–84 English victory in Morocco

Siege of Tangier (1679-1684)
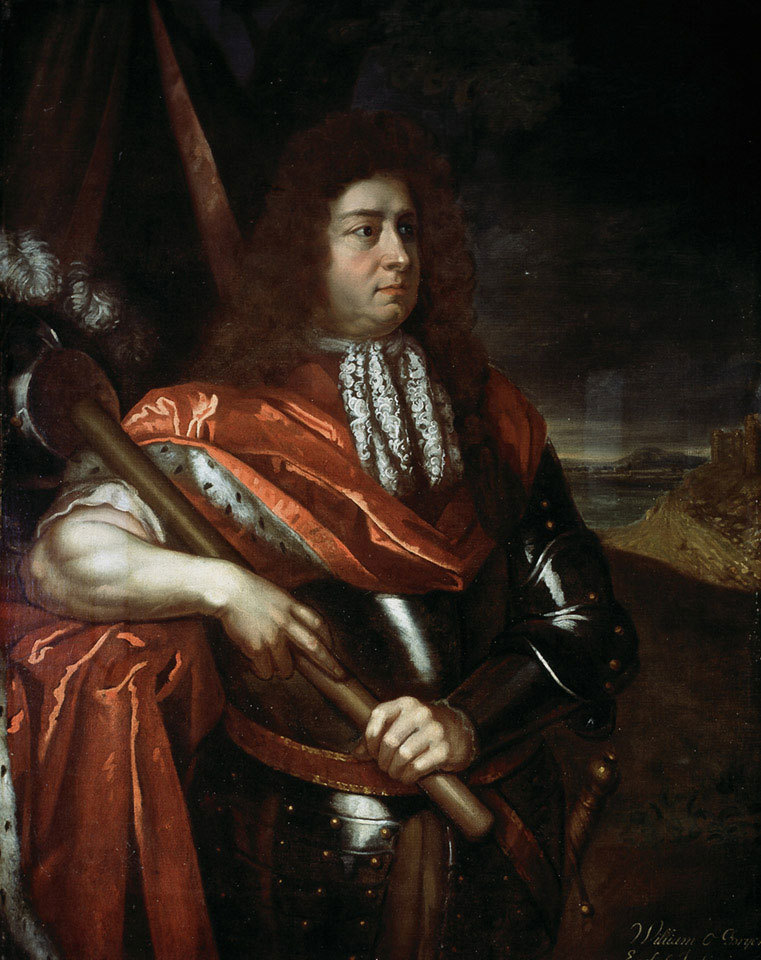
- The Earl of Inchiquin, the English commander during the siege
Date	25 March – 27 October 1680
Location	English Tangier
Result	English victory

Belligerents
England	Morocco

Commanders and leaders
(Kingdom of England) Earl of Inchiquin (Kingdom of England) Palmes Fairborne †	Omar ben Haddū

Strength
3,000	7,000–15,000

Casualties and losses
564	~500

The Great Siege of Tangier was an unsuccessful siege of English Tangier by the forces of the Alawi Sultanate of Morocco in 1680.

== Background ==
Since the start of their occupation of Tangier in 1661, the English had erected a number of forts around the town to help protect it. By the early 1670s, the English garrison in Tangier was relatively at peace but the supply of food was a concern. The new Alawi sultan, Moulay Isma'il, was initially preoccupied with consolidating his power. Large parts of northern Morocco were controlled by Khadir Ghaïlan (or al-Khadr Ghaylan) a warlord who had previously harassed the English and defeated them in 1664.

In 1666, Ghaïlan's priorities were different and, in return for a supply of gunpowder, he allowed the Tangier garrison to occupy a large strip of land around the city to meet their food needs, on the condition that they did not fortify it. The English subsequently violated these terms by building additional forts to expand the colony's size. By the late 1670s, a total of 15 forts had been built by the English beyond the city walls of Tangier.

Khadir Ghaïlan was defeated and killed by Moulay Isma'il's forces in 1673. Moulay Isma'il soon consolidated his power over the country, and by now, his forces had more significant military experience and training than Ghaïlan's warriors. He ordered that the forts outside Tangier be destroyed to reduce the colony back to its former size. The sultan's army attacked the forts intermittently in 1678 and 1679. Differing accounts of the time claimed that the Moroccan army mustered against the city numbered either 15,000 or 7000 men, outnumbering, in any case, the English garrison.

== Siege ==
A determined siege began on 25 March and lasted until 27 October 1680. The English garrison was at first under the command of the Earl of Inchiquin, but in June he was replaced by Palmes Fairborne, who was killed in action on October 24. Moroccan forces were commanded by Qāʾid Omar ben Haddū.

The Moroccans focused first on isolating and destroying the outer forts protecting the city, digging long trenches between them in order to cut off communications. Fighting was interrupted by a truce from 19 May to 15 September. By this point, most of the forts outside the city had fallen and the terms of the truce prevented the English commanders from attempting any refortification. After replacing Inchiquin, Fairborne wrote frequently to London requesting reinforcements. Major reinforcements were eventually sent to defend the city, including 180 English and 200 Spanish cavalrymen, 200 Scottish and 600 Irish infantrymen along with 500 sailors. This brought the English garrison to a total of over 3,000 men.

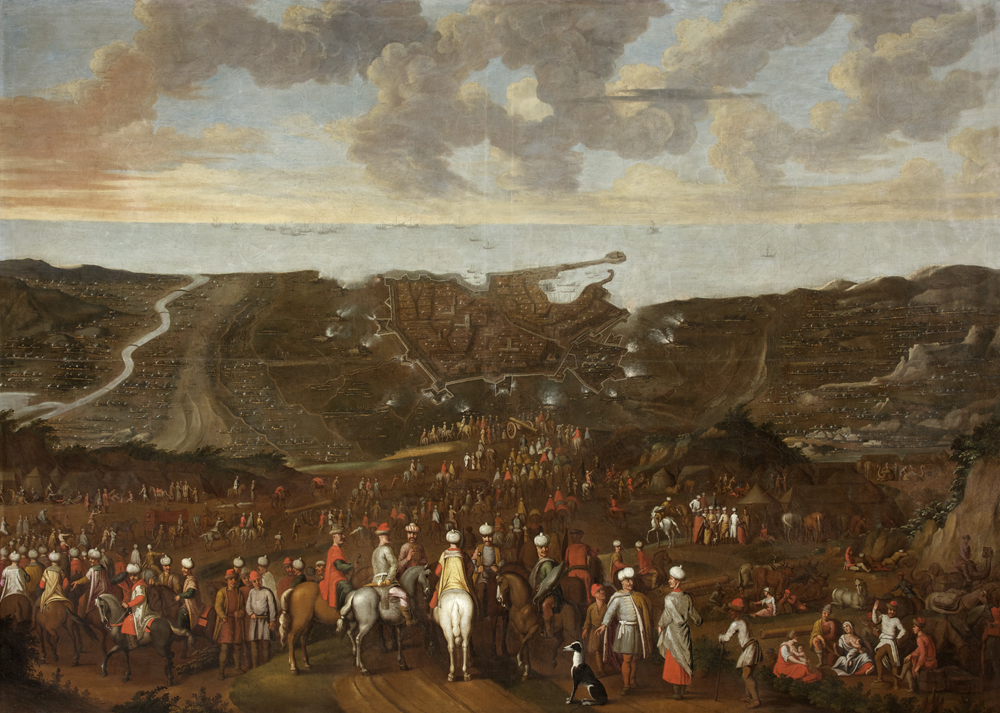
The English evacuation of Tangier in 1684

Hostilities were renewed in September, and skirmishes occurred continuously. The last clash took place on October 27, when the English forces were able to drive out the Moroccan forces and fill in the trenches they had dug. According to the English government, the garrison had suffered a total of 564 casualties, while Moroccan casualties were estimated at about 500.

== Aftermath ==
After the siege, a six-month truce was negotiated, followed by a four-year peace treaty. As the treaty neared its end and the possibility of renewed conflict loomed, the English king, Charles II, decided to evacuate and demolish Tangier in 1684. Various factors motivated this decision, including: the difficulties wrought by the siege, the mounting costs of maintaining the English garrison and of making the port viable, and domestic skepticism in England over the colony's value.

== Bibliography ==
- Bejjit, Karim (2015). English Colonial Texts on Tangier, 1661–1684: Imperialism and the Politics of Resistance. Ashgate.
- Childs, John (1976). The Army of Charles II. Routledge & K. Paul.
- Routh, E. M. G. (1912). Tangier: England's Lost Atlantic Outpost, 1661-1684. John Murray.
- Abun-Nasr, Jamil (1987). A history of the Maghrib in the Islamic period. Cambridge: Cambridge University Press. ISBN 0521337674.
