= John White (colonial administrator) =

John White (? – 22 August 1692, in St. Andrews), was acting Governor of Jamaica in 1692.

Previously president of the council, White was acting governor during the 1692 earthquake that destroyed Port Royal. The historian William James Gardner wrote of him:

White was a man who not only enjoyed the esteem of his fellow-colonists, but was endowed with a remarkable degree of self-possession.

John Bourden succeeded him for a brief time as Governor.

== Notes ==
Government offices
Preceded by The Earl of Inchiquin	Governor of Jamaica, acting 1692	Succeeded by John Bourden, acting
