= Tangier Garrison =

English garrison of Tangier

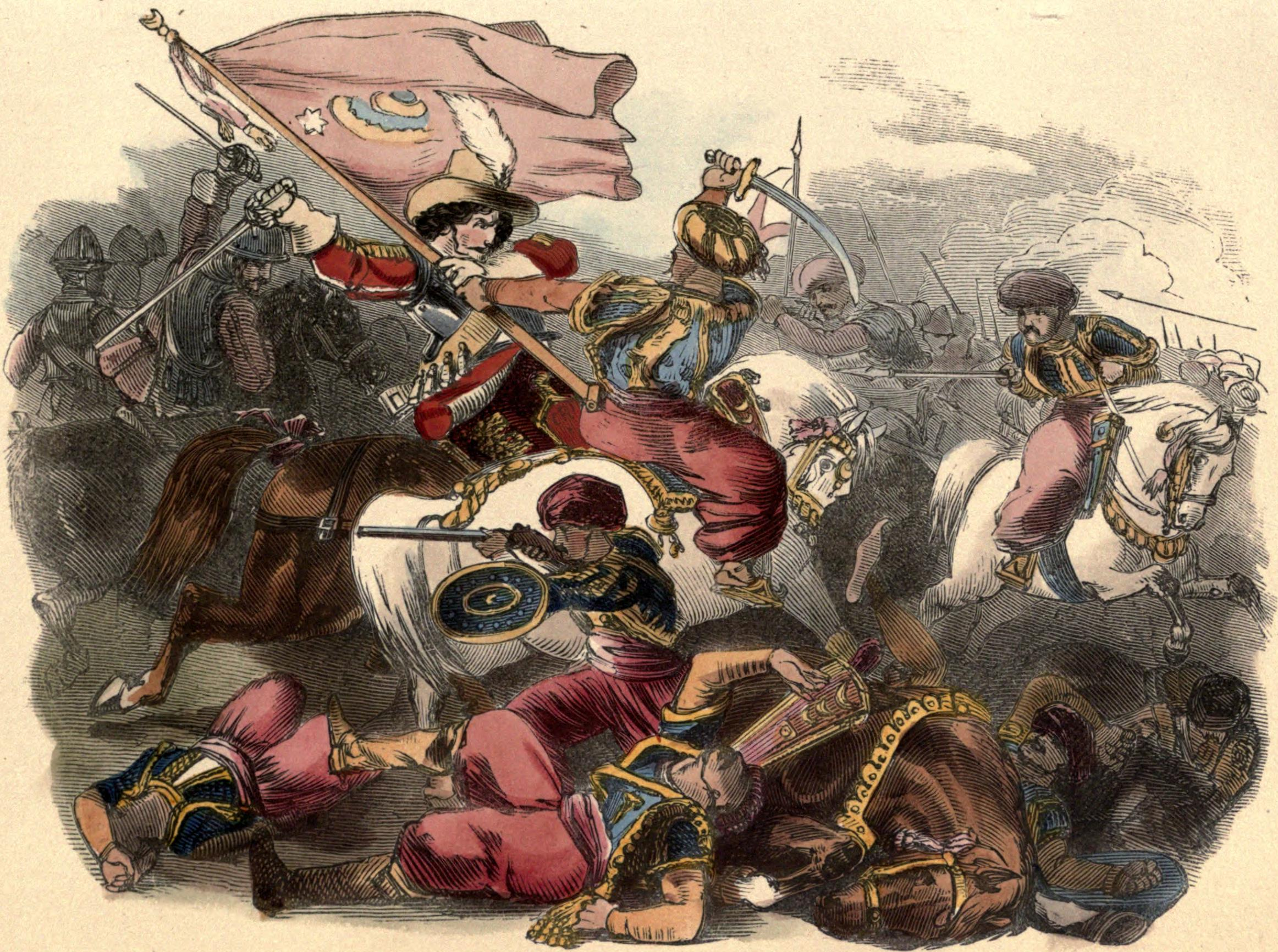
An illustration of the Tangier Garrison fighting at the Battle of Tangier in 1664

The Tangier Garrison was the land force which oversaw the defence of English Tangier between 1661 and 1684 when it was evacuated. It was part of the English Army, the de facto standing army that Charles II established following the Restoration. Charles II received Tangier as part of the Marriage Treaty with Portugal in 1661. He appointed Henry Mordaunt, 2nd Earl of Peterborough as governor and, on 30 January 1662, the new garrison took up its duties. Peterborough was not a successful appointment as governor, and Andrew, Lord Rutherford, was appointed in 1662/1663 to replace him.

== Initial garrison ==
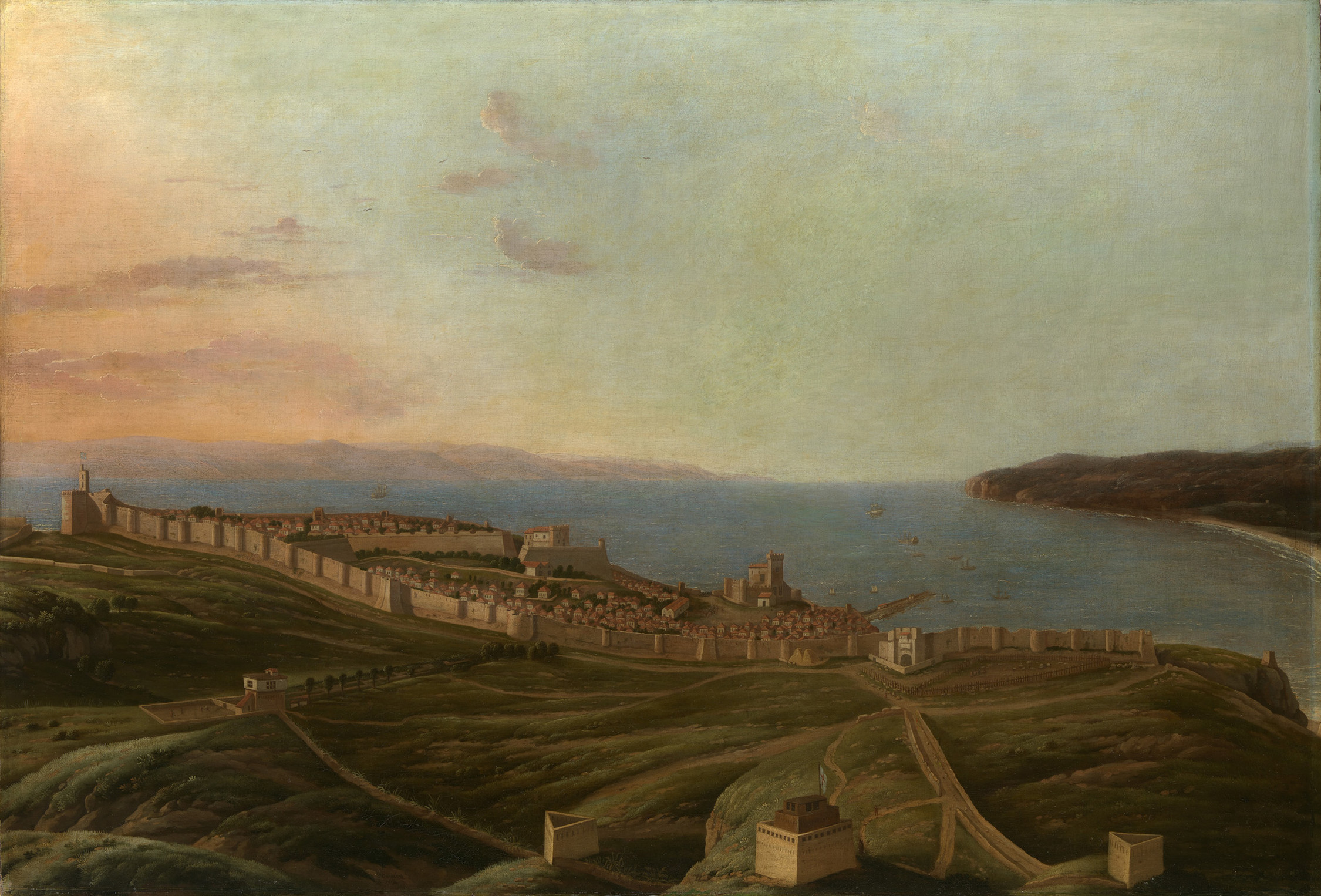
A View of Tangier by Hendrick Danckerts, 1669.

The early garrison of Tangier was a mixture of English Protestant (and often Republican) former soldiers of the New Model Army, and Irish (mainly Catholic) Royalists who had accompanied Charles in exile, serving in Royalist Army in Exile attached to the Spanish Army following the Treaty of Brussels.

The first main unit was a regiment raised in England by Peterborough, probably from amongst former Parliamentarian troops which were being disbanded. This, the Tangier Regiment (later, the 2nd Regiment of Foot and, later still, the Queen's Royal Regiment (West Surrey); in 1966 this became the Queen's Regiment and then in 1992 the Princess of Wales's Royal Regiment which still carries the Battle Honour Tangier 1662-80 on its Regimental Colour) was mustered on Putney Heath on 14 October 1661. As was usual, the regiment was officially referred to by its colonel's name; thus the Tangier Regiment will be found, variously, as Peterborough's, Rutherford's (or Teviot's), Fitzgerald's, Bellasis', Norwood's, Middleton's, Inchiquin's, Fairborne's, and Kirke's. After leaving Tangier, the Regiment became quite popularly (or unpopularly) known as Kirke's Lambs. The regiment, with augmentations and changes, served throughout the English occupation of Tangier, and certainly a few soldiers individually served almost the whole, if not the whole, of that time. Notable in the initial muster list, as a captain, is Palmes Fairborne, who himself became governor in 1680, after above 18 years of service there. He was killed by a shot from the Moors, dying in Tangier on 27 October 1680.

Also in the initial garrison was a former Parliamentarian regiment from the garrison of Dunkirk, Sir Robert Harley's regiment. This had previously been Lillingstone's Regiment, raised for service in Flanders in 1657, but most (indeed, almost all) of its officers (including Lillingstone himself) had been replaced before and after the Restoration. It is dubious whether any of the officers listed in August 1659 went to Tangier just over two years later. However, the Lieutenant-Colonel commissioned and so in command of the regiment (Harley did not travel to Tangier) was Maurice Kingwell, who had been Lieutenant-Colonel of Alsop's Regiment in Dunkirk in 1659. Where Peterborough described the regiment as "a regiment of the most estimable I have knowne, and that is governed by sober, able and discreete officers", Kingwell wrote to Harley with a bad report as to the regiment's condition, and his wife later upbraided Harley for "wretched neglect" of it. Peterborough's view may have changed when he sent Kingwell back to England as "seditious and insolent".

Further, there were two smaller (nominally about 500 men, as against 1,000 in the principal units) regiments, both Irish, from the disbanded Royalist Forces which had served with the Spanish Army in Flanders: Fitzgerald's Regiment and Farrell's Regiment. It is not clear which of the earlier Royalist regiments had become Fitzgerald's prior to its appearance in Mardyke in 1661. John Fitzgerald himself became notable during his time in Tangier. Farrell's Regiment had earlier been known as Lord Digby's (or Bristol's): In French service at St Ghislain in Flanders, George Digby had persuaded the regiment to change sides, enabling the town to be recaptured by Spain. Part of the defeated Spanish /Royalist army at the Battle of the Dunes, the remnant the regiment had also made its way to Mardyke under the command of Lisagh (or Lewis) Farrell. The two Irish Royalist regiments, with Harley's English Parliamentarian unit, were shipped more or less directly from Flanders to Tangier and, hence, do not appear on the establishment of the English Army at the time. Completing the first garrison was a troop of horse, nominally the Governor's. In addition, it was agreed to take onto the English establishment a troop of Portuguese cavalry who remained behind.

Thus, the military Establishment for Tangier was given as 3,000 foot (in four regiments, two of 1,000 men, and two of five hundred men) and one troop of 100 horse plus one expected troop of Portuguese horse who were to stay, but come onto English pay. The Establishment also shows general officers (Judge-Advocate, Physicians, Engineers, Gunners and so on). The actual number in the garrison (not including officers and general officers) was 2,723 foot soldiers (Governor's 1,000; Harley's 947; Fitzgerald's 395; Farrell's 381) with 98 in the English troop of horse and 80 in the Portuguese troop This was the first time that wives had been permitted, officially, to accompany an English army on an overseas posting. It is not clear whether wives and families accompanied the initial garrison, or whether they made their own way out over a period of time. Certainly, no ship appears to have been allocated to carry families where, on the return 22 years later, they were specifically provided for.

At the first council of war held by Peterborough, on 12 February 1662, there were present: The Governor; Colonel Farrell and Major Bolger of Farrell's; Lieutenant-Colonel Kingwell and Major Blague of Harley's; Lieutenant-Colonel Fiennes and Major Johnson of Peterborough's; Lieutenant-Colonel (Edward) Fitzgerald (not Colonel John Fitzgerald, who arrived a few days later) and Major Rudyard of Fitzgerald's; with 'Mat Lake' (probably Nathaniel Luke) as secretary.

[Fiennes' sally - under construction]

With the one major incident and (probably) many minor incidents, together with toll of poor living conditions and tropical diseases and ailments, the strength of the garrison had been reduced to 2,118 foot soldiers by 23 October 1662 (Governor's 793; Harley's 559; Fitzgerald's 395; Farrell's 371). That muster does not include the troop of horse but, during the year, the Portuguese horse appear to have returned to Portugal.

== Lord Rutherford ==
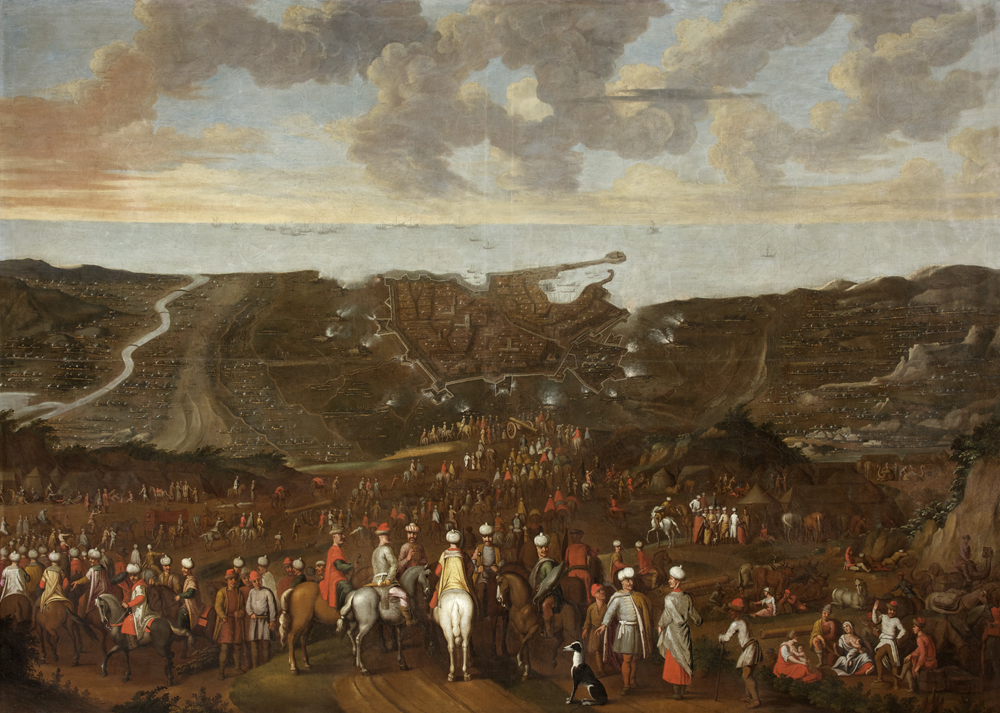
The English evacuation of Tangier in 1684

These units were augmented later in 1661 by elements of Rutherfurd's (Scottish Royalist) Regiment and Roger Alsop's (Parliamentarian) Regiment just before Peterborough was replaced by Andrew Rutherfurd, 1st Earl of Teviot as governor. The regiments were merged (into two in 1662) ultimately becoming a single regiment (1668), and this, the Tangier Regiment, remained in Tangier thereafter, a total of 23 years, until the port was finally evacuated in 1684. The religious and political differences sometimes caused them to clash and, although martial law was strictly enforced, the Garrison was prone to bouts of ill-discipline most notably drunkenness.

The Garrison quickly developed a reputation as a tough life, manning the forts of the town which were under constant threat from the Moorish inhabitants of the surrounding region. While this often involved sporadic skirmishes, it also included larger engagements such as the Battle of Tangier against Guyland and the Great Siege of Tangier.

Despite occasional enforcement of the Test Acts, the garrison was notable for the large number of Catholics serving in it. Irish Catholics in particular, unable to serve in the Irish Army due to the Penal Laws, went to Tangier. It also attracted professional soldiers, as it was one of the few places where those in the English Army could find active service. This made it a source of protests in the English Parliament, where Whigs regarded it as a large "Catholic Army" which might be brought to England by Charles to enforce absolute rule on the country. These fears grew especially large at the time of the Popish Plot. It was due to these political pressures, as well as its large cost, that the Garrison was eventually withdrawn and Tangier abandoned.

After returning to the British Isles, many of the veterans of the Garrison went on to play influential roles in the Glorious Revolution and the War of the Two Kings. A group of officers known as the "Tangerines" were part of the conspiracy to invite William III to invade England to take the throne from his uncle James II in 1688. Many former Tangier officers were key figures in the development of the modern British Army.

== Bibliography ==
- Davis, Lt-Col John (1887). The History of the Second, Queen's Royal Regiment. Vol. 1. Richard Bentley.
- Dalton, Charles (1892). English Army Lists and Commission Registers 1661-1714. Vol. 1. Eyre & Spottiswood..
- Firth, Charles Harding (1903). Royalist and Cromwellian Armies in Flanders 1657-1662 Transactions of the Royal Historical Society. Vol. 17. pp. 67–119. JSTOR 3678138.
- Green, Mary A. E., ed. (1886). Calendar of State Papers, Domestic Series, 1959-1960. London: Longmans (under direction of the Master of the Rolls).
- Ward, Richard, ed. (1894). The Manuscripts of the Duke of Portland. Vol. 3. London: Eyre and Spottiswood for the Historical Manuscripts Commission.
- Childs, John (1976). The Army of Charles II. Routledge. ISBN 978-0-415-41276-6. The URL is a preview location only.
- Childs, John. The Army, James II and the Glorious Revolution. Manchester University Press, 1980.
