= Battle of Tangier (1664) =

1664 battle between English and Moroccan forces

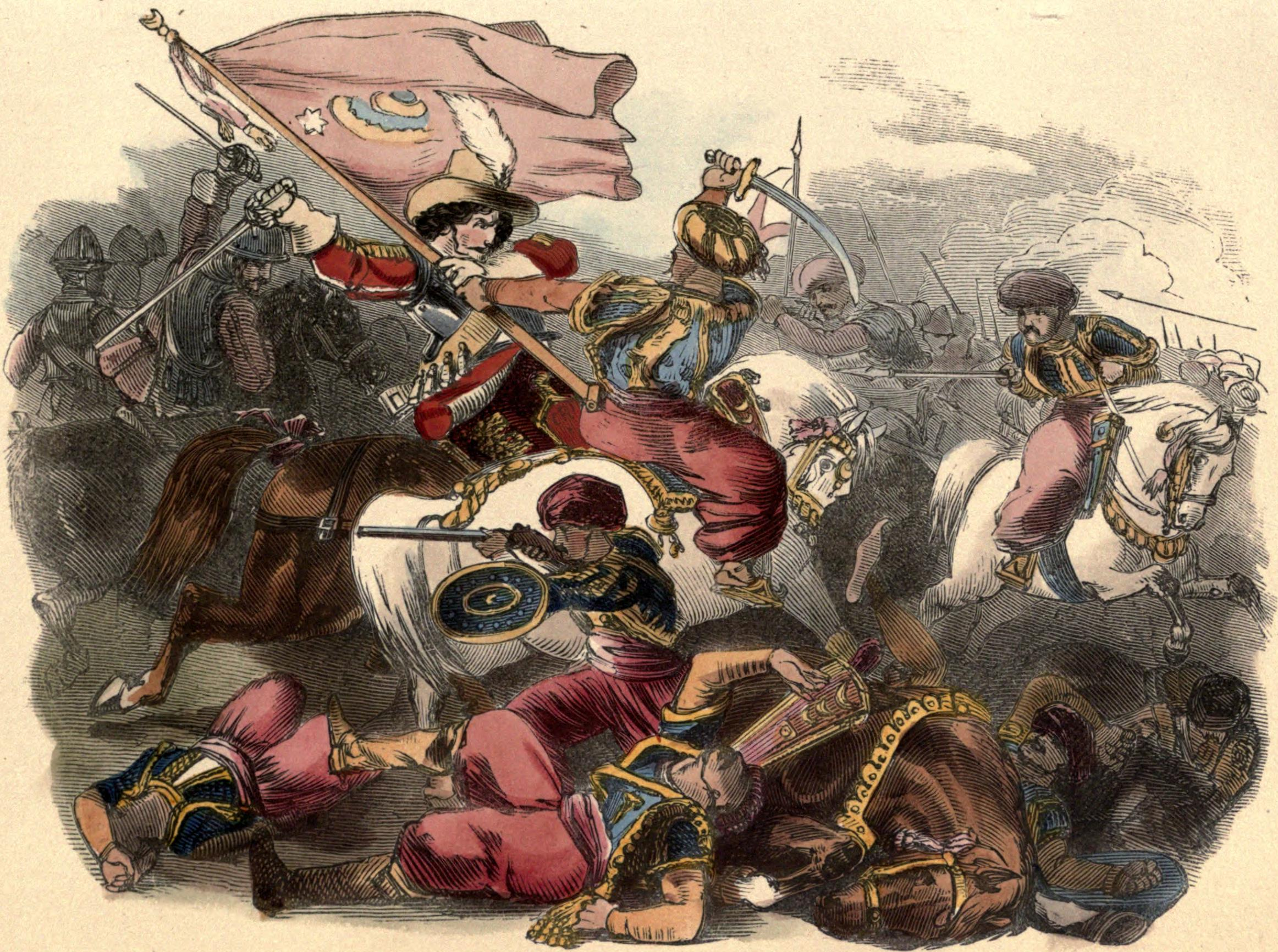
- An illustration of the battle
Date	4 May 1664
Location	English Tangier, North Africa
Result	Moroccan victory

Belligerents
Morocco	England

Commanders and leaders
Khadir Ghaïlan	Earl of Teviot †

Strength
~11,000	500

Casualties and losses
Unknown (heavy)	~470 killed

The Battle of Tangier, also known as the Battle of Jew's Hill, took place between a detachment of the English Tangier Garrison under the command of governor of Tangier Lord Teviot by a Moroccan force commanded by Khadir Ghaïlan on 4 May 1664. Successfully ambushing the 500-strong English force, Ghaïlan's men killed all but thirty of them, including Teviot. The battle was the bloodiest defeat suffered by the Tangier Garrison during the English occupation of Tangier.

== Background ==
In 1661, the Moroccan city of Tangier, which had previously been part of the Portuguese Empire, passed under English control as part of the dowry of Charles II of England when he married Catherine of Braganza. During England's occupation of Tangier, the Tangier Garrison, an English Army force sent to garrison the city, faced constant attacks from Moroccan forces opposed to their presence in the region. In 1663, Scottish soldier Lord Teviot was sent to Tangier to serve as the city's governor.

Upon arriving in North Africa to take up the post, Teviot implemented major reforms to the Tangier Garrison during his tenure in office. Teviot also ordered the construction of several outlying fortifications to protect Tangier and won several victories over the forces of Khadir Ghaïlan (known to the English as "Guyland"), a local Moroccan warlord. However, Teviot was frequently frustrated in his plans by a lack of building materials.

== Battle ==
On 4 May 1664, Teviot, commanding a 500-strong detachment of Tangier Garrison troops (consisting of a mixture of English and Irish soldiers) marched his men towards an area known to the English as Jew's Hill or Jew's Mount. Some historical accounts suggest that Teviot had made plans to gather stocks of stone, timber and other building materials from the surrounding areas, though other accounts suggested that Teviot's expedition may have been intended to forage the local area or that he planned to cut down a patch of brushwood that Moroccan forces had used as cover during their previous attacks on Tangier.

Once Teviot and his men had crossed a river known to the English as Jew's River, they encountered around 3,000 Moroccan warriors. Teviot's men rapidly attacked the Moroccans, driving them off. They pursued the fleeing enemy, but it quickly became apparent that this was a trap as a much larger Moroccan force of 8,000 men under the command of Ghaïlan was waiting to ambush them. The broken terrain was ill-suited for Teviot's men to form their battle ranks, and the engagement quickly devolved into hand-to-hand combat in which Teviot's men were overwhelmed by sheer numbers. Teviot attempted to rally his men on the top of Jew's Hill but was killed in action. Only around thirty of the five hundred who had marched out escaped back to the safety of Tangier.

== Aftermath ==
As had occurred in other Anglo-Moroccan conflicts over Tangier, the Moroccans mutilated the corpses of Teviot's men who were killed during the battle. Following Teviot's death, the position of governor and command over the Tangier Garrison devolved to his Irish subordinate, John Fitzgerald. Moroccan pressure on Tangier weakened due to political developments occurring elsewhere in Morocco, and Fitzgerald signed several ceasefire treaties with hostile Moroccan parties, which by 1666 had led to a general peace in English Tangier. Though occasional skirmishes between the Tangier Garrison and Moroccan forces continued to occur, a major battle would not occur until the Great Siege of Tangier in 1680.

== See also ==
- Battle of Tangier (1662)
- Battle of Tangier (1675)
- Great Siege of Tangier
