= Edward Sackville (died 1714) =

English soldier and landowner

Edward Sackville (c. 1640 – 1714) was an English soldier and landowner, rising to the rank of major general, briefly a member of parliament, and after the Glorious Revolution a Jacobite.

== Early life ==
Sackville was the fourth son of Sir John Sackville (died 1661) of Knole, Kent, and of Westminster, by his marriage to Elizabeth Walter, a daughter and coheiress of Sir William Walter of Wimbledon. His father was a younger son of the Sedlescombe branch of the Sackville family, an uncle of Thomas Sackville, and one of the members of parliament for Rye in the first and second Parliaments of Charles I. At the outbreak of the Civil War, Sir John Sackville was living at Knole as factotum for the 4th Earl of Dorset, and raised money and arms for the King. Arrested by parliamentary forces, he was committed to the Fleet Prison.

Edward Sackville also recalled having served King Charles I as a boy, but no record of this was later traced. When his father died in 1661, he inherited the manor of Baldslow and the benefice of Mountfield. However, little is known of his life before he became a soldier.

In 1667 Sackville was commissioned as an ensign into the First Foot Guards (later the Grenadier Guards) and served as a captain from 1672 to 1680, the first two of those years in the English Regiment, with his cousin, the Hon. Edward Sackville. In 1678 he was appointed as lieutenant colonel of Sidney's Foot Guards and then was posted in the same rank to the Coldstream Guards. In 1679 he was serving as lieutenant to the Yeomen of the Guard.

== Parliament ==
At the first general election of 1679, in the midst of the Exclusion Crisis, Sackville was elected to the First Exclusion Parliament as a member for East Grinstead, beating both Henry Powle and a son of Lord Chief Justice Scroggs, but he was prevented from playing any part in debates, as a result of accusations by Titus Oates, whom he knew. Oates called Sackville a rascal, provoking Sackville into calling Oates a lying rogue and saying he did not believe in the Popish Plot. Parliament assembled on 6 March, and it took several days for a Speaker to be elected, with William Gregory eventually being decided upon. Oates then complained to Gregory about Sackville, who had to promise “to limit my discourse so for the future as not so much to name Mr Oates nor anything of his former life”. Nevertheless, on a motion by John Maynard, it was resolved unanimously to expel him from the House of Commons, to send him to the Tower of London, and to recommend King Charles II to cashier him from the army. Sackville responded that he hoped it was not the wish of the House to ruin him, as he had no other means of support. A week later, he was released from the Tower, and on 7 April 1679 his election was declared void. His vacant seat in Parliament was then awarded to Henry Powle, one of the unsuccessful candidates. Sackville blamed the whole affair on the malice of Scroggs.

== Later career ==
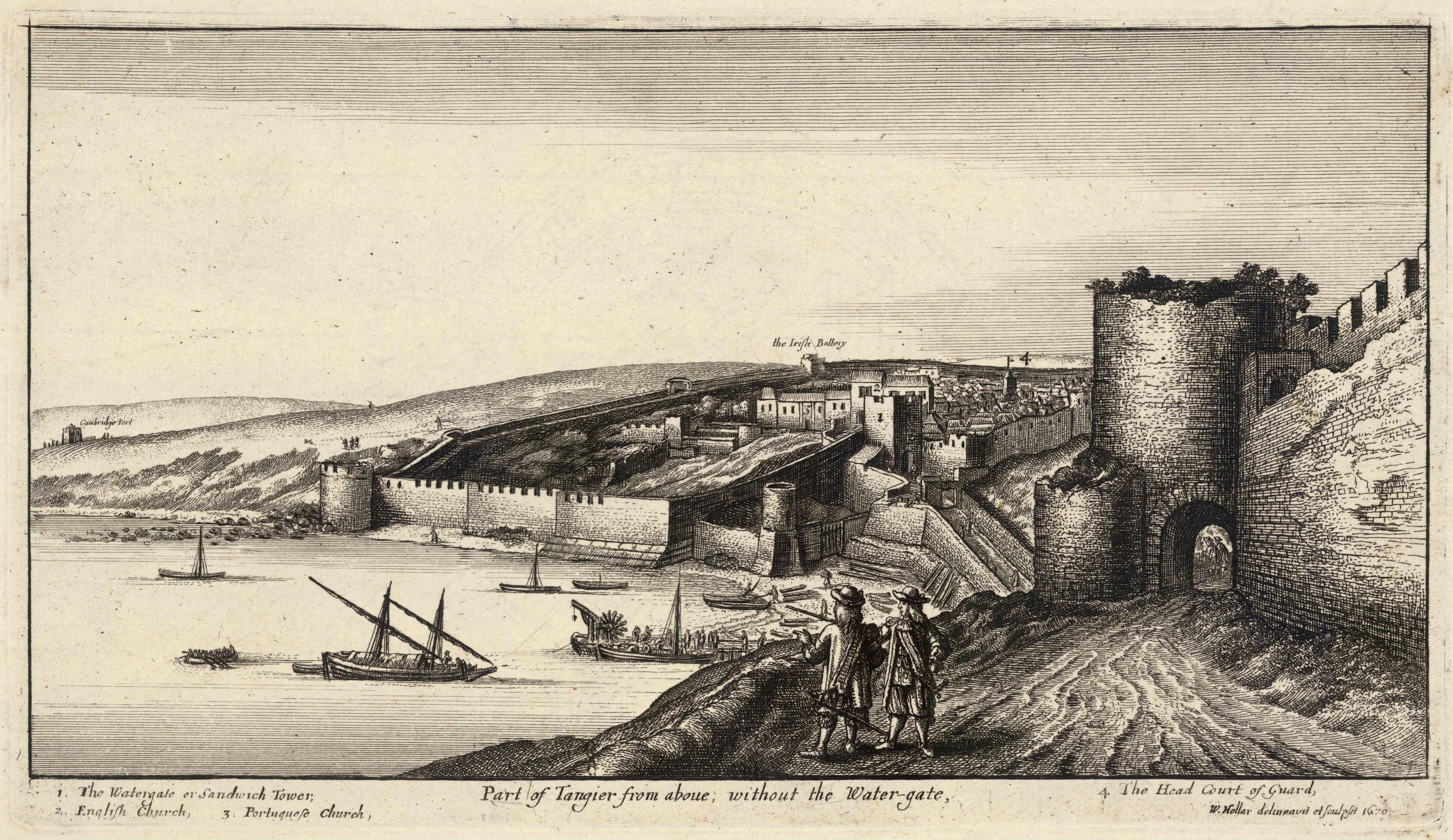
English Tangier as it was when Sackville was commanding officer and acting Governor

Sackville's military career did not suffer from his short political adventure. In the summer of 1680 he was posted to the Tangier Garrison of the colony of English Tangier as Lieutenant Colonel of two companies of the new Tangier Regiment known as the King's Battalion. On the death of Charles FitzCharles, 1st Earl of Plymouth, Governor of Tangier, in October 1680, Sackville took over as acting Governor, continuing in the role until December 1681. The English abandoned Tangier in 1684. After the accession to the throne of King James II in February 1685, Sackville became a Roman Catholic and was given fast promotion, within weeks becoming a Brigadier and then a major-general in November and December 1688, when he continued his allegiance to the king in the Glorious Revolution.

Sackville surrendered his commission to the outgoing king at Rochester on 19 December 1688, becoming active as a Jacobite conspirator. He got military information from John Churchill, Earl of Marlborough.

In 1690, Sackville was arrested on the orders of the Queen, together with Edward Lee, 1st Earl of Lichfield, Thomas Bruce, 2nd Earl of Ailesbury, Roger Palmer, 1st Earl of Castlemaine, Viscount Preston, Lord Montgomerie and Lord Belasyse, Sir Edward Hales, Sir Robert Tharold, Sir Robert Hamilton, and Sir Theophilus Oglethorpe, and was briefly imprisoned. He was a non-juror to the end of his life. In 1706 he received an annuity of £100 under the will of his kinsman Charles Sackville, 6th Earl of Dorset, and died on 9 January 1714.

== Posterity ==
Before 1677, Sackville married Anne Thornton, and they had at least two sons. Their son Thomas Sackville was gentleman of the bedchamber to James Francis Edward Stuart in exile, but died in 1732, and no descendants are known.
