= English Tangier =

Period of English occupation of Tangier, Morocco (1661–1684)

- 1661–1684
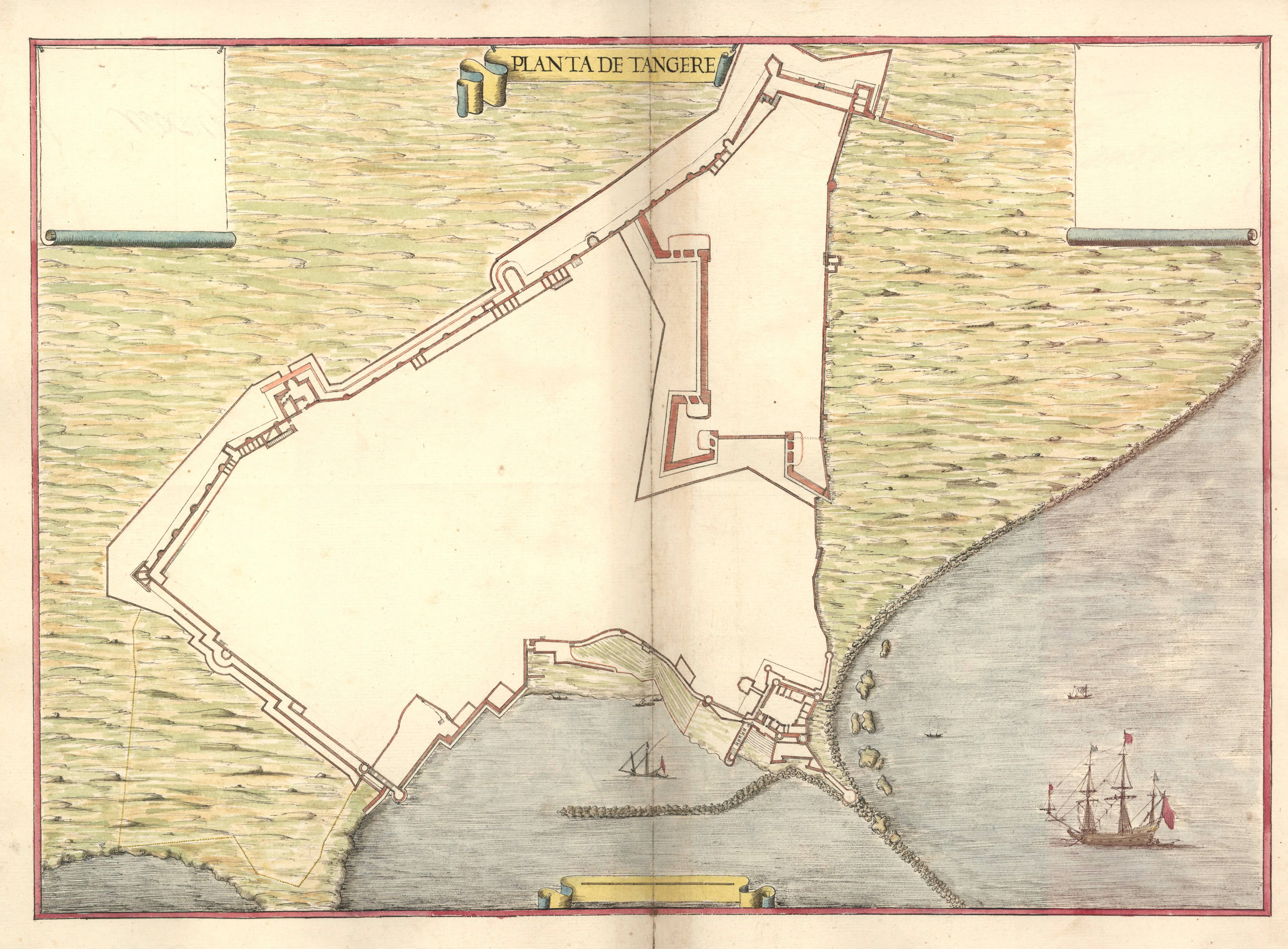
- Leonardo de Ferrari's plan of the Portuguese fortifications at Tangier, c. 1655
- Status: Territory of the English Empire
- Capital: Tangier
- Official languages: English
- Common languages: Maghrebi Arabic
- Religion: Church of England; Sunni Islam
- History
  - Given by Portugal as dowry: 1661
  - Siege of Tangier: 1684
- Currency: Gold dinar Silver dirham Pound sterling
Preceded by	Succeeded by
Portuguese Tangier	Alaouite dynasty
- Today part of: Morocco

English Tangier was the period in Moroccan history in which the city of Tangier (also spelled Tangiers) was occupied by England as part of its colonial empire from 1661 to 1684. Tangier had been under Portuguese control before Charles II of England acquired the city as part of the dowry when he married the Portuguese Infanta Catherine of Braganza. The marriage treaty was an extensive renewal of the Anglo-Portuguese Alliance. It was opposed by Spain, then at war with Portugal, but clandestinely supported by France.

The English garrisoned and fortified the city against hostile but disunited Moroccan forces. The exclave was expensive to defend and fortify and offered neither commercial nor military advantage to England. When Morocco was later united under the Alaouites, the cost of maintaining the garrison against Moroccan attack greatly increased, and Parliamentary refusal to provide funds for its upkeep, partly because of fears of 'Popery' and a Catholic succession under James II, forced Charles to give up possession. In 1684, the English blew up the city's harbour and defensive works that they had been constructing and evacuated the city, which was swiftly occupied and annexed by Moroccan forces.

== History ==
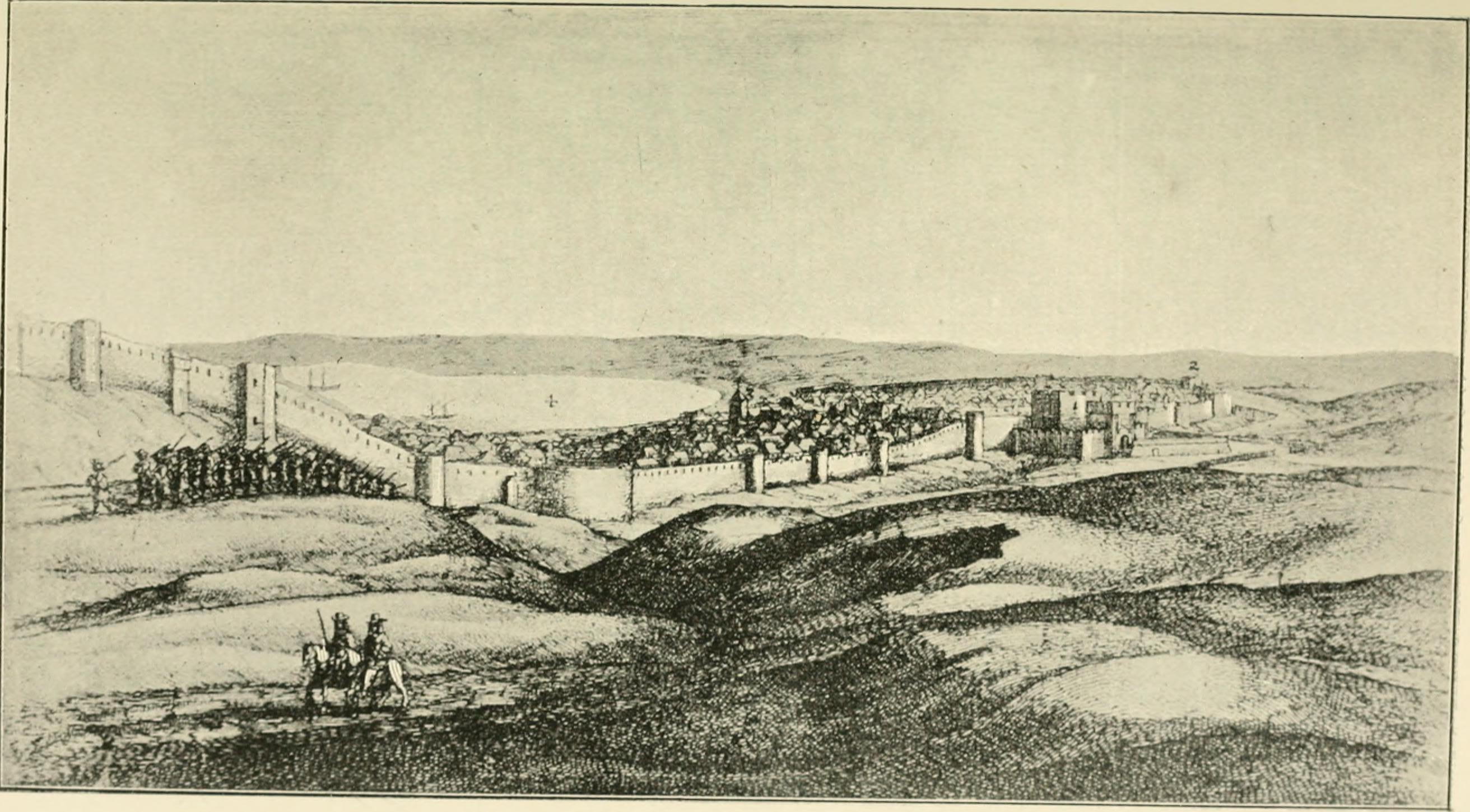
Wenceslaus Hollar's landscape of Tangier at the beginning of the English occupation

=== Background ===
Tangier has the best natural harbour on the western end of the Strait of Gibraltar, allowing its owner to control naval access to the Mediterranean. Since antiquity, it and Ceuta to its east were the major commercial centres on the north-western coast of Africa.

==== Portugal ====
The Portuguese started their colonial empire by taking nearby Ceuta in 1415. Years of conflict between Portugal and the Moroccans under the Wattasid and Saadi dynasties followed. In 1471, the Portuguese stormed Asilah to the west and threw Tangier into such chaos that they were able to occupy it completely unopposed.

By 1657, the position had changed. The Saadi dynasty steadily lost control of the country to various warlords and finally came to an end with the death of Ahmad al-Abbas. The main warlord around Tangier was Khadir Ghaïlan (known to the English of the time as "Guyland"). He and his family had taken control of much of the Gharb, the Rif, and the other coastal areas around Tangier. He appears to have considerably increased attacks on Portuguese Tangier.

Meanwhile, after the Dila'i interlude, the Alaouites came to the forefront. Mulai al-Rashid (known as "Tafileta" by the English) took Fes in 1666 and Marrakesh in 1669, essentially unifying all of Morocco except the ports occupied by Portugal, Spain, and England. He was supportive of restoring Muslim control over the ports, but he and the last of the Dila'ites (around Salé) still put their own pressures upon Ghaïlan.

The Treaty of the Pyrenees in November 1659 specifically pledged that Louis XIV of France would withdraw support from Portugal under the Braganzas and released Spanish troops and ships to pursue the continuing Portuguese Restoration War. Portugal, severely weakened and with little support in other countries, sought a renewal of its alliance with England to counterbalance the renewed Spanish threat to its independence.

The alliance—which had originated in 1373—had been adjusted and renewed in 1654 under Cromwell—and was again renewed in 1660 after the English Restoration. Negotiations for the marriage of Charles to Catherine of Braganza (originally proposed by Charles I) had started shortly after (perhaps even before) the Restoration, and the proposed marriage was mentioned by the Venetian envoys as early as June 1660. As part of the dowry, Portugal was to hand over the port of Tangier and the island of Bombay (now Mumbai) but it is unclear when those detailed terms were agreed upon or became publicly known. Some were widely rumoured early, certainly before the marriage treaty itself.

The Portuguese government was content to part with Tangier, though many within the country had reservations. The anchorage was not particularly safe for shipping and, exposed to the Atlantic and to destructive winds from the east, it was expensive to maintain, requiring significant improvement. Khadir Ghaïlan had mounted a major attack on the city in 1657, forcing the governor and garrison to appeal to Lisbon for assistance. Portugal, hard pressed in its war of independence from Spain and struggling against Dutch aggression in the East Indies, could not hope to maintain all of its overseas possessions without English assistance and could not afford to commit troops to the defence of Tangier while fighting Spain in the Iberian peninsula. Indeed, Portugal had even offered Tangier to France in 1648 to try to solicit support against Spain.

However, cession of Tangier to England was not popular with the general public and with many in the army. The governor of Tangier, Fernando de Meneses, refused to co-operate and had to be replaced in 1661 by the more compliant Luis de Almeida.

==== Spain ====
Spain had tolerated Portuguese occupation of Tangier as part of the Treaty of Tordesillas and had left its Portuguese administration largely undisturbed during the Iberian Union and even under the long-running Restoration War, lest a weakened position expose it to Moroccan reconquest. Nonetheless, Spain was strongly opposed to English possession of Tangier and insisted that the cession would be illegal. Indeed, the note presented by the Spanish ambassador in May 1661 openly threatened war.

A strongly established English naval presence at the Straits of Gibraltar posed a threat to its ports on both the Atlantic and Mediterranean and to communication between them. It also threatened communication not just with Spain's colonial empire but with the maritime links between Spain and the Habsburgs' Italian possessions in Sicily and Naples. English fleet activities in the Mediterranean under Robert Blake and Edward Montagu between 1650 and 1659 had shown just how vulnerable Spain's shipping lanes had become. With its emphasis on its transatlantic possessions, Spain had no Mediterranean fleet and could not protect its shipping there: the presence of a hostile naval force at Tangier would make the transfer of Spanish troops from Italy to Spain for the intended war against Portugal much more difficult.

By a proclamation of 7 September 1660 (announced in Spain on 22 September), Charles had declared peace with Spain, but in the same month the Commons passed a bill annexing Dunkirk and Jamaica. Both had been taken under Cromwell and both had been demanded back by Spain upon the ascension of Charles II. There was a fear in England that the Portuguese commander at Tangier would hand the port over to Spain rather than "heretic" England or that Spain would otherwise attempt physically to prevent the handover, even if its actions fell short of war. There were further fears that Spain had enlisted Ghaïlan's assistance to attack by land while Spain attacked by sea.

==== Dutch Republic ====
The Dutch had suffered intensely during the First Anglo-Dutch War. Although they were at peace for the moment, they were still competing intensely for trade and had no wish to see the English navy further establish the Mediterranean power it had developed under Cromwell. They were at war with the Portuguese and did not want to see the Anglo-Portuguese alliance renewed. The Dutch hoped to seize more of Portugal's overseas possessions and had equipped a fleet for that purpose in 1660. They tried, unsuccessfully, to strengthen relations with King Charles II by the Dutch Gift in July of the same year.

The States General also sought in negotiations from July 1660 until September 1662 to secure a treaty or pact of friendship with England, but refused to extend such a treaty to any colonies outside Europe with the sole exception of the island of Pulo Run. While that negotiation went on, Charles offered to mediate between the United Provinces and Portugal. (The Anglo-Portuguese treaty, a very short time later, required this.) His intervention resulted in the Treaty of The Hague on 6 August 1661, although it was ignored by the Dutch East India Company. The Company seized Cranganore, Cochin, Nagapattinam, and Cannanore from Portugal in 1662 and 1663.

At the same time, King Charles sought the advancement of his nephew William (later William III) as Stadtholder. Johan De Witt, the "Grand Pensionary", was a confirmed Republican and had excluded William through the 'secret' (but widely leaked) Act of Seclusion annex to the Treaty of Westminster with Cromwell. The States General was unable or unwilling to rein in the Dutch East India Company's aggressively anti-English and anti-Portuguese activities; the Republic hence had no significant influence in Restoration England, and De Witt's diplomatic failures in 1660–1661 marked the beginning of the end of the Dutch Golden Age. Although De Ruyter's presence in the Mediterranean necessitated caution, the English acquisition of Tangier could not be meaningfully opposed by the Dutch.

==== France ====
In France, Cardinal Mazarin was at the height of his powers following the formation of the League of the Rhine in 1658; the defeat—with the help of Cromwell's army and navy—of the Prince of Condé and Spain at the Battle of the Dunes the same year; and the signing of the Treaty of the Pyrenees on 7 November 1659. Spain (then allied with English Royalists) and France (allied with Commonwealth England) made peace, and by the treaty Louis XIV was betrothed to Maria Theresa of Spain. The treaty also required France to cease direct or indirect support for Portugal. In May 1660, six months after the treaty was signed, Charles II was restored. Mazarin realized that an alliance between Restoration England and Spain, with its extensive lands in Italy and the Netherlands, would almost surround France and leave both more powerful than he wished; he worked quickly to restore relations with Charles's court. By August, he had proposed the marriage of Philippe I, Duke of Orléans, to Charles's sister Henrietta Anne. It is likely that he encouraged the Braganza marriage, but he died on 9 March 1661 and Louis took personal control of his government. In July 1661, Louis sent the Comte d'Estrades as his ambassador to London, and it is clear from the instructions and correspondence between them that the treaty between England and Portugal was welcomed by France. At the time, France had no significant Mediterranean or East Indies naval presence, and English possession of Tangier and Bombay posed no apparent threat. In 1656, Louis or Mazarin had proposed the cession of Tangier to France, but no agreement had been reached and the peace with Spain probably precluded any further similar proposal.

==== England ====
In 1659, Cromwell's England was allied to France by the 1657 Treaty of Paris; was allied to Portugal, was at war with Spain, and was not a party to the Treaty of the Pyrenees. King Charles II's government in exile was, technically, allied to Spain and so pledged to resist Portugal's independence and to raise forces against France by the 1656 Treaty of Brussels, the converse of the Commonwealth position. After his restoration, Charles declared peace with Spain in September 1660 but there was already speculation about a possible Portuguese marriage. There is debate as to who proposed Charles's marriage to Catherine of Braganza and when; but by a letter dated 5 or 15 June 1660, the queen regent of Portugal Luisa de Guzmán requested Charles's consent to send Francisco de Mello as an ambassador extraordinary to negotiate a new treaty. According to Clarendon's account, the ambassador suggested the treaty and marriage to the lord chamberlain the Earl of Manchester, who informed the King. Charles consulted Clarendon (Lord Chancellor), Southampton (Lord Treasurer), Ormonde (Lord Steward of the Household), Lord Manchester, and Sir Edward Nicholas (Secretary of State) and enquired as to Tangier to the Admirals Lord Sandwich and Sir John Lawson. Clarendon is vague, perhaps misleading, as to chronology. Ambassador De Mello had a private audience with Charles on 28 July 1660 (7 August 1660 NS) and, after other meetings, returned to Lisbon on 18 or 28 October 1660. The Queen Regent was pleased and made him Marquis de Sande. He returned to England on 9 February 1661 (NS) and from then until the announcement of the marriage at the opening of the Cavalier Parliament on 8 or 18 May 1661 there were rumours and counter-rumours, amongst them suggested marriages to Mademoiselle d'Orleans (who had previously rejected Charles), to an unidentified 'Princess of Parma', and to Princess Maria of Nassau. Indeed, rumours continued even after that, but the treaty was signed on 23 June 1661 and witnessed by Clarendon, Southampton, Albemarle, Ormonde, Manchester, Nicholas, and Morrice.

=== English occupation ===
==== Sandwich and Portugal 1661–1662 ====
Before the treaty with Portugal and marriage to Catherine was announced at Charles's coronation on 8 May 1661, Admiral Sir Edward Montagu, 1st Earl of Sandwich was commissioned to bring Catherine over to England. The corsair fleet of Algiers was a growing problem. Montagu was instructed, by negotiation or by bombardment, to secure a treaty with Algiers not to molest English ships. He also carried instructions to seek peaceful arrangements with Tripoli, Tetuan, and Salé. Sandwich left London on 13 June for the fleet assembled at the Downs and from there, with John Lawson as Vice-Admiral, sailed to Algiers, where he arrived on 29 July. There was little negotiation, and a short bombardment, but weather prevented more significant action. Sandwich left Lawson to blockade Algiers, and proceeded to Lisbon, not yet in his official capacity as an Ambassador Extraordinaire, but rather to meet a second English fleet which was to take possession of Tangier. There was a perceived danger that the Spanish and Dutch would attack the Portuguese Brazil fleet and, reciprocally, Spain and the allied Dutch merchants feared that the English would attack the Spanish treasure fleet; hence there was some careful watching until those both arrived safely. The marriage, by proxy, of Charles and Catherine was notified to the Governor of Tangier (Don Luis D'Almeida) by letter from the King of Portugal on 4 September 1661. Lord Sandwich sailed back to Tangier on 3 October (arriving 10 October) taking transports for the evacuation of the Portuguese Tangier Garrison. He remained there for some three months, while awaiting the further fleet from England bringing the new Governor and troops. Still expecting trouble from Spain or the Netherlands, Lawson's squadron joined him, unsuccessful in subduing Algiers (although a storm severely damaged the harbour there the next year and enabled a peace later). During the waiting time, there was correspondence with the other Barbary ports, and with Ghaïlan, who ostensibly welcomed Sandwich. Sandwich had met Ghaïlan before, when watering the fleet during his 1657 voyage with Robert Blake in the Mediterranean. It is likely that Sandwich also used the time to obtain details of the city and its defences – Martin Beckman was with Sandwich's fleet at Algiers and Tangier and produced the map later seen and admired by Pepys. It was reported that Sir John Lawson and Sir Richard Stayner purchased houses in the town during this time and, perhaps, Sandwich also bought then the house he later owned.

In England, a Tangier Committee of the King's Privy Council was appointed, with its members including Samuel Pepys, Secretary to the Admiralty, and Prince Rupert of the Rhine. Pepys later claimed that all Rupert did in meetings was to laugh and swear occasionally.

==== Portuguese raid and handing Tangier to the English ====
On 14 January 1662, the Portuguese garrison consisting of 140 cavalry attempted a sally out into the surrounding countryside, taking about 400 head of cattle, and also capturing 35 women and girls. Unsurprisingly, the Moroccans numbering around 100 counter-attacked and recovered the booty, killing some 51 of the Portuguese, including the Aidill (the military commander) and twelve knights, pursuing the remainder of the force to the city gates. Alarmed, the Governor (Luis de Almeida) requested assistance from Sandwich's fleet in the bay. Sandwich sent parties of seamen ashore to man the defences, under the command of Sir Richard Stayner, effectively (but not formally) taking control of the city to help protect it against attacks by Ghaïlan (supported by Spain) and, perhaps, to ensure a withdrawal by the Portuguese. By 23 January, Sandwich had three to four hundred men ashore.

==== Peterborough, Teviot, Bridge, FitzGerald, Belasyse and Ghaïlan 1662–1666 ====
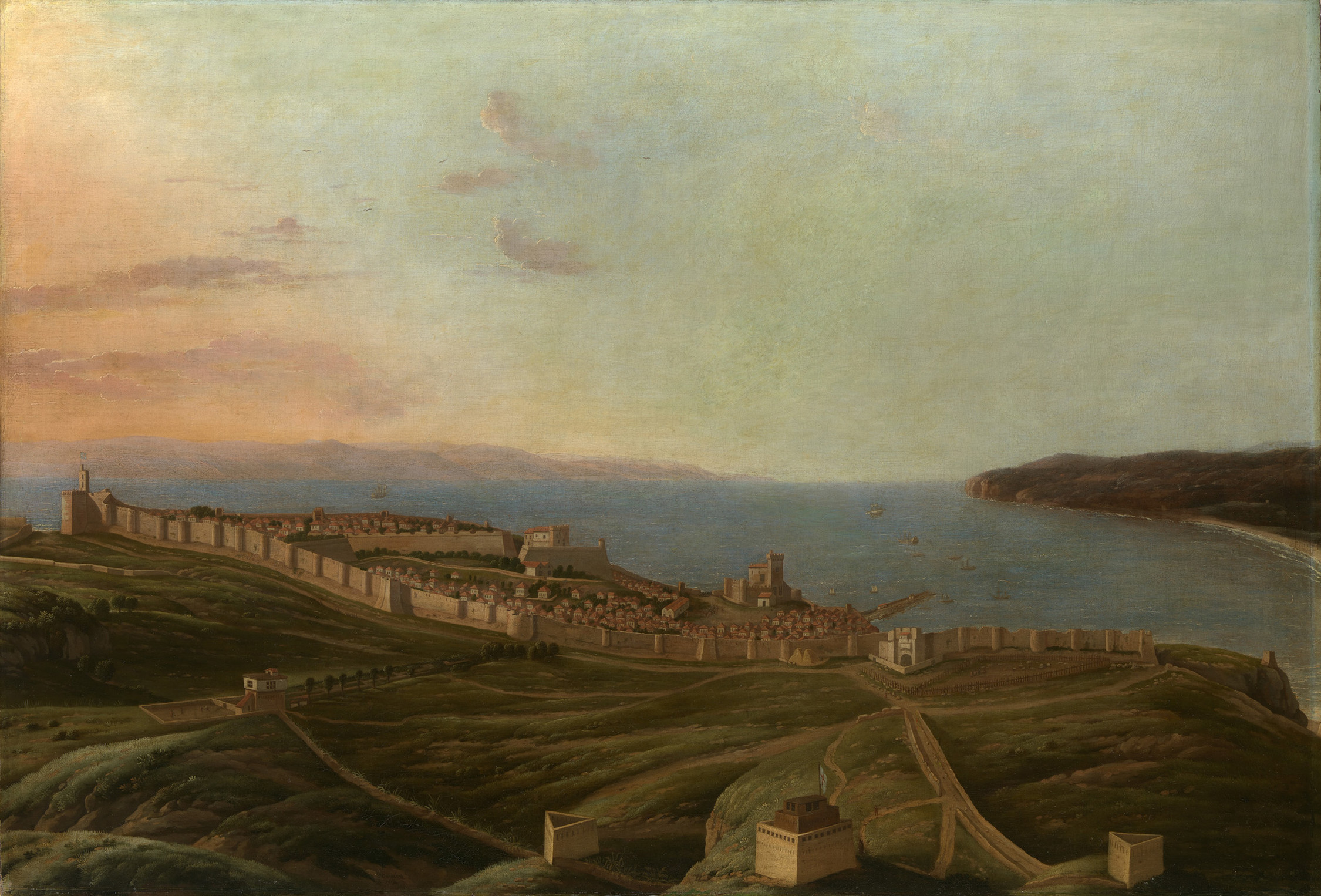
A View of Tangier by Hendrick Danckerts, 1669

On 6 September 1661, King Charles had appointed Henry Mordaunt, 2nd Earl of Peterborough, as governor and captain general of all the forces in Tangier. (Note: Davis sets out the full commission.) Peterborough quite quickly raised a regiment in England, probably in large part from the Parliamentary forces which were being disbanded, but otherwise took some time over the preparations; he finally sailed for Tangier on 15 January 1662, arriving, with a considerable force, on 29 January. When Peterborough landed he found the fleet already in possession. The Tangier Garrison (his new regiment augmented by units from Flanders) disembarked on 30 January and the city keys were handed over with due ceremony.

The start was far from auspicious. The available accommodation was completely insufficient for the three thousand or so troops, who had little in common (neither language nor, for the most part, religion or custom) with the Portuguese population; the money (such as was available to the new occupants) was English currency, unfamiliar to the townspeople. The basis of the Portuguese garrison had, in large part, been a militia of the men of the town and they, of course, had been driven back within the walls. Given that Portugal had been seeking (and, latterly, expecting) to dispose of Tangier; had a major war with Spain at home; and needed to raise a very significant dowry for the marriage; it is not surprising that some neglect may have crept in but it is also clear that Peterborough was not well prepared. The list of the stores which were immediately required, even after Sandwich had provided much from the fleet, is a tacit admission of the inadequacy of those brought with the occupation force. Peterborough reported that the Portuguese, leaving, had carried off the very ffloers, the Windowes, and the Dores, but since most of the inhabitants, and their possessions, were repatriated by the English fleet, that may be an exaggeration.

Moreover, the idea that the Portuguese inhabitants would enrol as soldiers for the new Government is nowhere reflected in the forecast expenditure of the garrison, except in respect of a troop of horse which did, in fact, enrol.

At the time when Peterborough arrived, Ghaïlan was engaged at Salé, fighting with Mohammed al-Hajj ibn Abu Bakr al-Dila'i (known to the English as "Ben Bowker") the last (as it turned out) of the Dila'ites but, with his army, he appeared close to Tangier around 22 March 1662, and Peterborough arranged parleys.

Perhaps indicative of the problem with borders or limits to English possession of the city is the map of the forts around Tangier in 1680. To the East, beyond York Fort, and beyond the ominous, all-embracing, area marked as "The Moors", are the words "To Portugal Cross". It is perfectly likely that this refers to a form of padrão marking what the Portuguese considered to be the border. English occupation never came close to establishing such a distant frontier.

These units were augmented later in 1662 by elements of Rutherfurd's (Scottish Royalist) Regiment and Roger Alsop's (Parliamentarian) Regiment just before Peterborough was replaced by Andrew Rutherfurd, 1st Earl of Teviot as Governor. The regiments were merged (into two in 1662) ultimately becoming a single regiment (1668), and this, the Tangier Regiment, remained in Tangier thereafter, a total of 23 years, until the port was finally evacuated in 1684. Irish soldiers formed a significant part of the garrison during the English occupation; historian Thomas O'Connor estimates that about 1,000 Irish soldiers served at Tangier between 1661 and 1684.

==== Norwood, Middleton and Inchiquin 1666–1680 ====
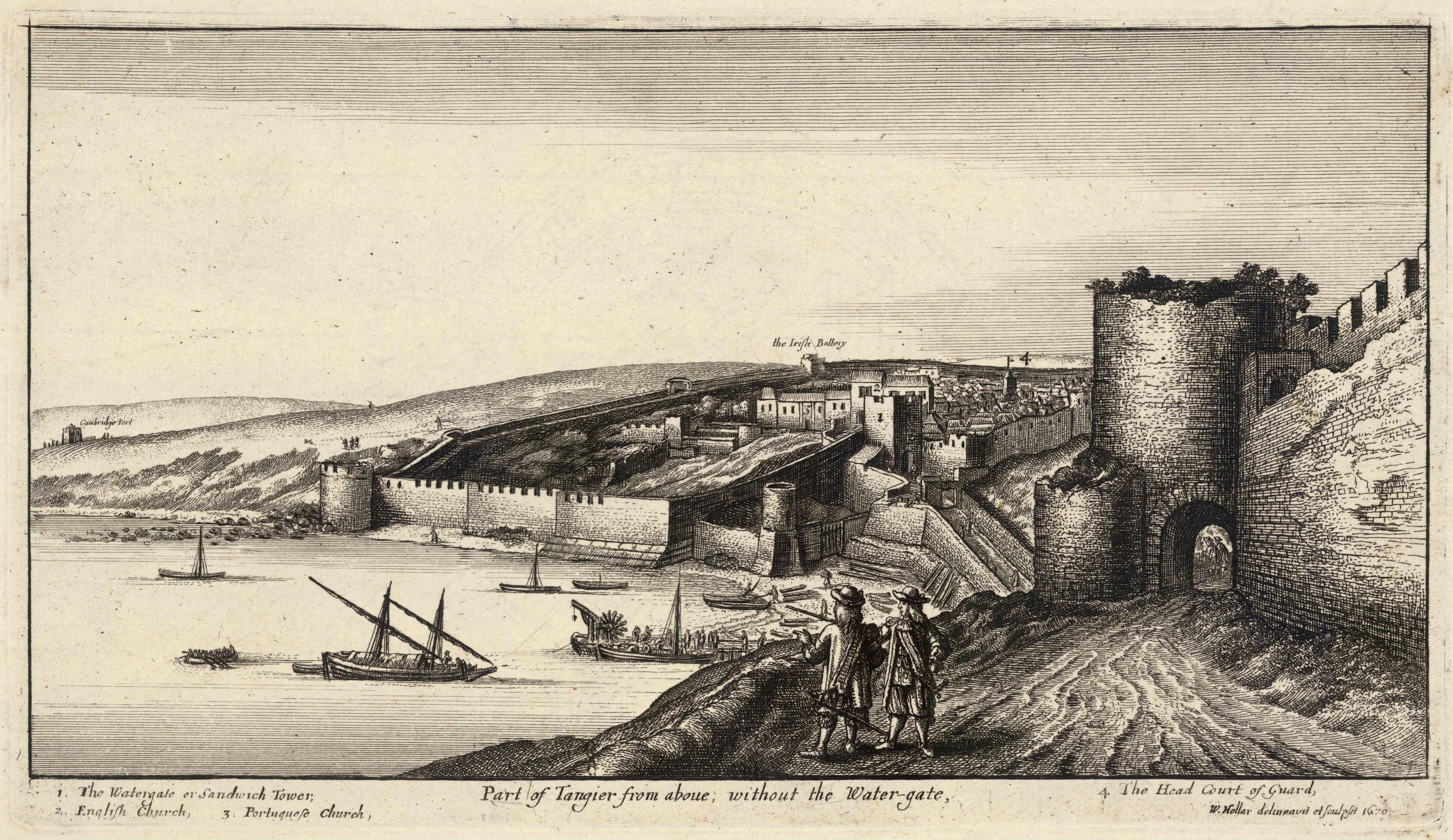
Tangier c. 1670 by Wenceslaus Hollar.

In 1674, William O'Brien, 2nd Earl of Inchiquin took up the post of governor, in succession to the Earl of Middleton. In 1675, a garrison school was founded, led by the Rev. Dr George Mercer.

On 4 June 1668, Tangier was declared a free city by charter, governed by a mayor and corporation. The charter made it equal to English towns.

==== Ossory, Plymouth, Sackville, Kirke and Mulay al-Rashid 1680–1683 ====
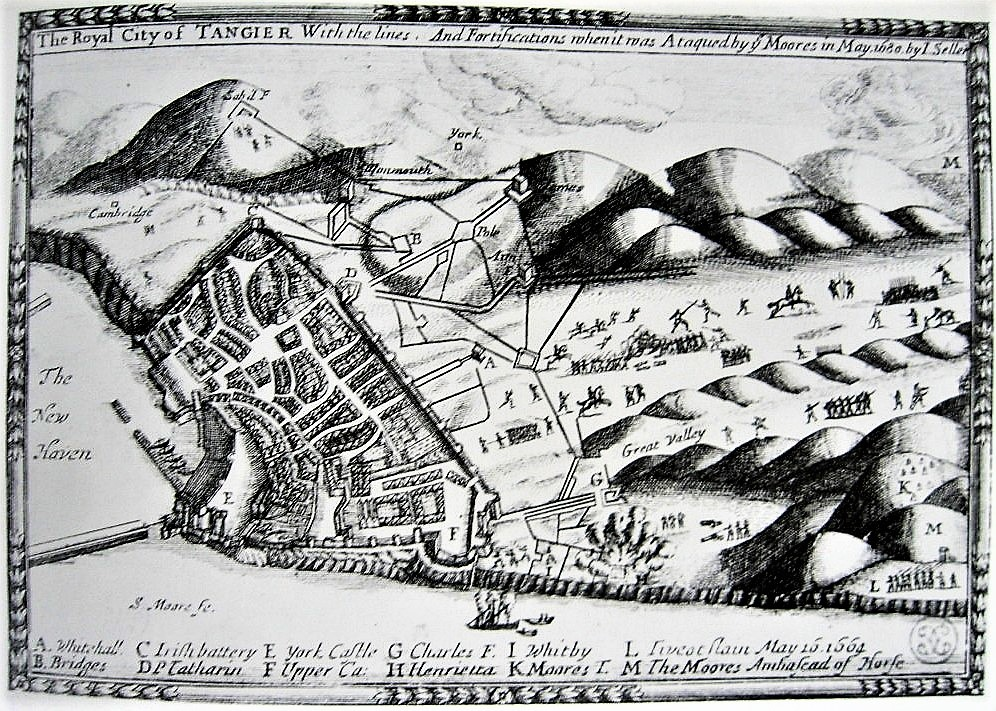
Map of Tangier under English rule, 1680

The Royal Scots, shortly followed by a further (new) foot regiment, the 2nd Tangier Regiment, (later the King's Own, 4th Regiment of Foot) raised on 13 July 1680, were sent to Tangier, reinforced by a composite King's Battalion formed from the Grenadier and Coldstream Guards, the Duke of York's Regiment (disbanded in 1690) and The Holland Regiment (the later 3rd Foot) and the remnant of the old Tangier Regiment. In 1680 the Earl of Inchiquin resigned and was replaced by Thomas Butler, 6th Earl of Ossory, who died before taking up his post.

In October 1680, Colonel Charles FitzCharles, 1st Earl of Plymouth, arrived as governor, but was taken mortally ill soon afterwards. Lt-Colonel Edward Sackville of the Coldstream Guards took over the governorship temporarily until on 28 December 1680 Colonel Piercy Kirke was appointed colonel and governor.

In England, in the Exclusion Crisis, the House of Commons of England petitioned the King to give his assent to the Bill of Exclusion (which had passed the Commons, but not the Lords) intended to disinherit the Duke of York (later James II and VII). The Earl of Shaftesbury (effectively the Prime Minister) urged Parliament to disapprove any taxes unless and until the bill was passed. The King refused to prejudice his brother's right of succession and dismissed the Exclusion Bill Parliament and, later, the Oxford Parliament. But he could no longer afford the cost of the colony in Tangier. The financial burden was not borne by the English Exchequer alone. The Tangier establishment was charged to the Irish Exchequer until the colony was abandoned in 1684. In 1678, Ireland was required to contribute £44,000 annually towards the maintenance of Tangier, and a further £18,000 a year was imposed soon afterwards.

==== Dartmouth and evacuation 1683–1684 ====
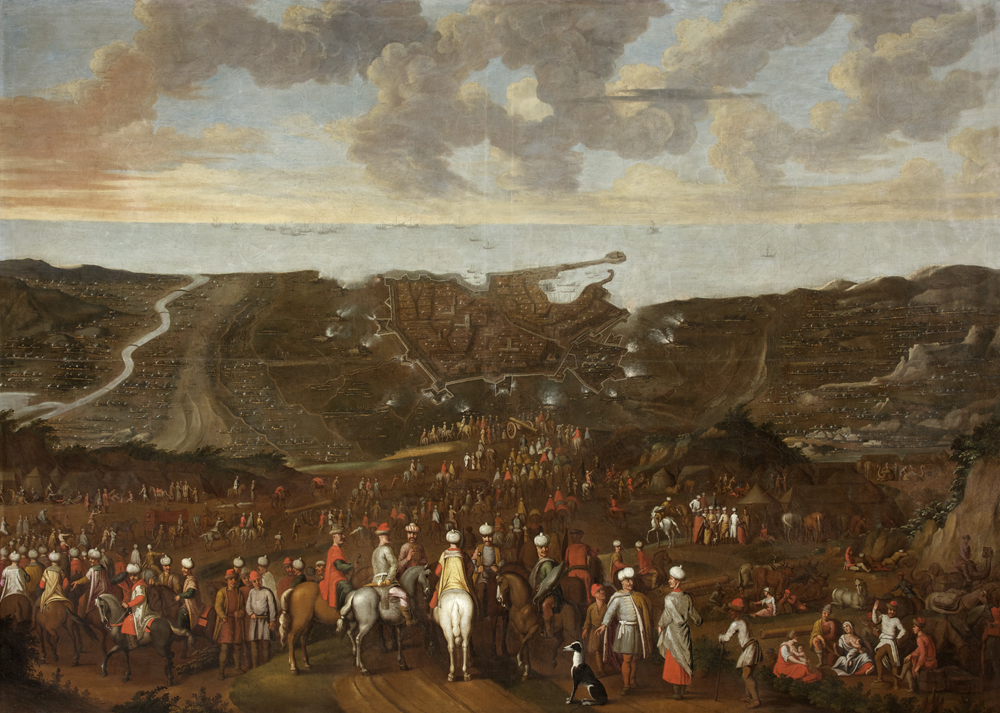
The English evacuation of Tangier in 1684

The fundamental problem was that in order to keep the town and harbour free from cannon fire the perimeter of the defended area had to be vastly increased. A number of outworks were built (Note: Diagrams mapping out the English 1662-1684 outworks to scale are presented in Elbl, mostly based on Sir Bernard De Gomme's engineering plans and on Hollar. The work discusses the various sources and their characteristics and is sound on the topography and works but is, sadly, spoiled for British readers by Elbl's anglophobia. For instance, Elbl considers that for its temporary English occupiers Tangier was a "gravy-pot(s) for operators wise to the workings of Court and Parliament whether officers, rapacious victuallers, speculators, rack-rent landlords" in contradistinction to the previous "grinding and dogged commitment" of the Portuguese officers, victuallers, and landlords.) but the siege of 1680 showed that the Moroccans were capable of isolating and capturing these outworks by entrenchments and mining. Although the attempt by Sultan Moulay Ismail of Morocco to seize the town had been unsuccessful, a crippling blockade by the Jaysh al-Rifi ultimately forced the English to withdraw.

=== Aftermath ===
Some of the departing soldiers were to be rewarded with large land grants in the newly acquired Province of New York. Thomas Dongan, 2nd Earl of Limerick, a lieutenant-governor of Tangier, became New York provincial governor and William "Tangier" Smith, the last mayor of Tangier, obtained 50 miles of Atlantic oceanfront property on Long Island.

== Infrastructure ==
The English planned to improve the harbour by building a mole, which would reach 1,436 feet (438 m; 0.2720 mi) long and cost £340,000 before its demolition. The improved harbour was to be 600 yards (550 m) long, 30 feet (9.1 m) deep at low tide, and capable of keeping out the roughest of seas. (Note: GIS-based plans of the historic harbour and of its works with all its data in modern coordinates, prepared from English and Portuguese documents, are available in Elbl.) Work began on the fortified harbour at the end of November 1662, and work on the mole in August 1663. The work continued for some years under a succession of governors. With an improved harbour the town would have played the same role that Gibraltar later played in British naval strategy. (Note: A long study of the previous Portuguese Breakwater at Tangier and interesting notes on the English Mole and its contractors are found in Elbl.)

== Governors ==
Term	Governor	Deputy/Acting	Notes
30 January 1662 to 9 May 1663	Henry Mordaunt, 2nd Earl of Peterborough	John Fitzgerald	
10 May 1663 to 4 May 1664	Andrew Rutherford, 1st Earl of Teviot	John Fitzgerald	Rutherford killed in action in Tangier
4 May 1664 to 7 June 1664		Sir Tobias Bridge	
7 June 1664 to April 1665	John Fitzgerald (Lieutenant-Governor)		
April 1665 to 1666	John Belasyse, 1st Baron Belasyse		Unable to take oath of conformity
1666 to 1669	Sir Henry Norwood		
1669 to 1670	John Middleton, 1st Earl of Middleton		
1670 to 1672		Sir Hugh Chomondeley	
1672 to 1674	John Middleton, 1st Earl of Middleton		
1674 to 1675			
1675 to 1680	William O'Brien, 2nd Earl of Inchiquin		
1680 to 1680	Palmes Fairbourne		
1680 to 1680	Thomas Butler, 6th Earl of Ossory		died after appointment but before taking up position
1680 to October 1680	Charles FitzCharles, 1st Earl of Plymouth		died soon after taking up position as governor
October 1680 to 28 December 1681		Edward Sackville	
28 December 1681 to 1683	Sir Percy Kirke		
1683 to 6 February 1684	Admiral Lord Dartmouth		

== See also ==
- List of governors of Tangier
- George Elliott, surgeon
- Roger Elliott
- Alexander Spotswood
- Tangier Protocol
- Tangier Garrison
