= 2nd Tangier Regiment =

The 2nd Tangier Regiment was raised by the then-Governor of Tangier Henry Mordaunt, 2nd Earl of Peterborough in 1662.

Part of the standing army of King Charles II, the regiment's intended role was to serve as a garrison for the Colony of Tangier, but that was evacuated four years later. After a number of changes of name, it became the 4th (The King's Own) Regiment of Foot when regimental numbers were introduced in the British Army in 1751.
