= William O'Brien, 2nd Earl of Inchiquin =

Irish army officer and colonial administrator (1640–1692)

The Right Honourable The Earl of Inchiquin PC
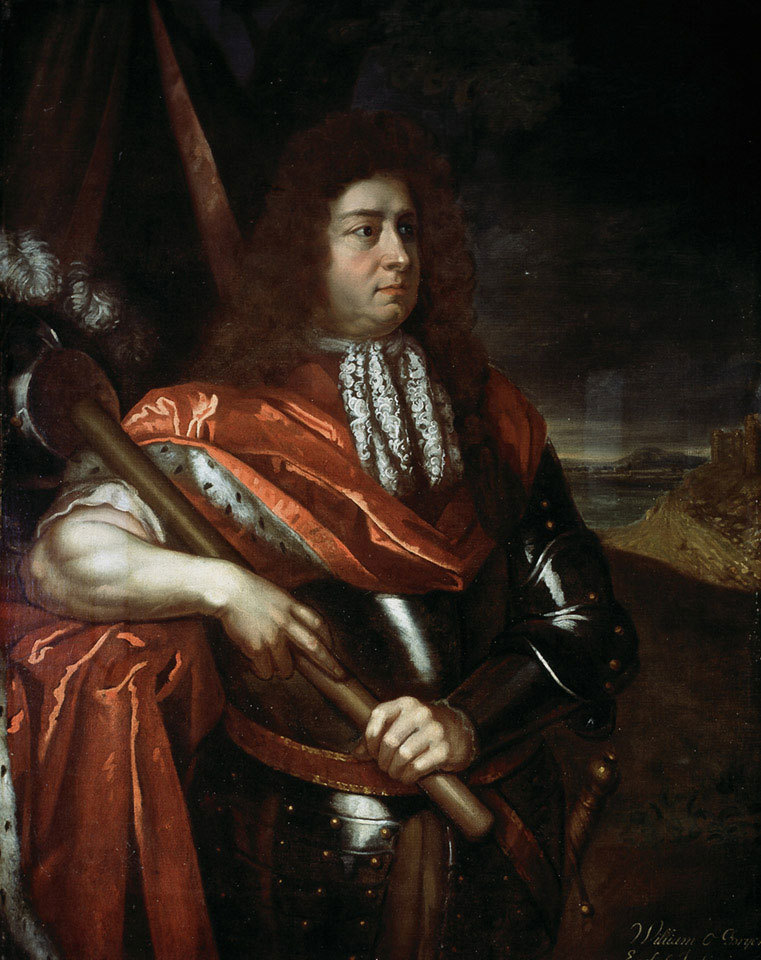

Governor of Tangier
- In office 1675–1680
- Monarch: Charles II
- Preceded by: Earl of Middleton
- Succeeded by: Sir Palmes Fairborne

Governor of Jamaica
- In office 1690–1692
- Monarch: James II
- Preceded by: Francis Watson
- Succeeded by: John White

Personal details
- Born: c. 1640 Doneraile, County Cork
- Died: January 16, 1692 (aged 51–52) Spanish Town, Jamaica
- Spouse(s): Lady Margaret Boyle (m. 1665); Lady Elizabeth Brydges (m. 1684)
- Children: 4, including William

Military service
- Allegiance: France (1659–1660); England (1674–1680)
- Branch/service: French Royal Army (1659–1660); English Army (1674–1680)
- Rank: Colonel
- Unit: Tangier Regiment
- Battles/wars: Williamite War in Ireland

Colonel William O'Brien, 2nd Earl of Inchiquin, PC (Ire) (c. 1640 – 16 January 1692), was an Irish army officer and colonial administrator who served as the governor of Tangier from 1675 to 1680 and the governor of Jamaica from 1690 until his death in office in 1692. O'Brien is best known for his long career in the service of the English Crown, serving as a colonial governor in England's overseas possessions in Africa and the West Indies.

Born c. 1640 in Doneraile, County Cork to the 1st Earl of Inchiquin, O'Brien was raised in London growing up. After being briefly imprisoned during the Second English Civil War, O'Brien eventually left England to enlist in the service of the French Royal Army in 1659 alongside his father. While on board a French fleet in 1660, he was captured by Ottoman corsairs and imprisoned for a year in North Africa before being released and returning to England.

In 1671, O'Brien joined the Irish Privy Council, and was appointed as the governor of Tangier in 1674. However, O'Brien's governorship was poor and in 1680 he was recalled. After King James II succeeded to the English throne in 1685, O'Brien was removed from the Privy Council. During the 1688 Glorious Revolution, he supported the Williamites and fought an unsuccessful campaign against Jacobite forces in Munster before moving to London.

O'Brien was appointed as the governor of Jamaica in 1689, assuming the office a year later. During his tenure as governor, O'Brien was frequently at odds with the Jamaican assembly and governor's council over the colony's finances, in addition to amassing a large personal fortune worth 15,000 pounds. He also reestablished the fledgling judiciary of Jamaica and suppressed a slave rebellion before dying at Spanish Town of dysentery in 1692.

== Early life ==
William O'Brien was born c. 1640 at the town of Doneraile in County Cork, Ireland. His father was Murrough O'Brien, 1st Earl of Inchiquin, a Royal Irish Army officer and nobleman. O'Brien's mother was Elizabeth St Leger, the daughter of Lord President of Munster Sir William St Leger. Growing up, O'Brien was raised in London at the home of Sir Philip Perceval, a friend of his father, where he formed a friendship with Perceval's eldest son John.

In 1648, O'Brien was briefly imprisoned by the Parliamentarian government in the Tower of London after his father defected to the Royalist side and took Lord Broghill's children as hostages in the ongoing Second English Civil War. Four years later in 1652, O'Brien paid a visit to Ireland and met the Lord Deputy Henry Cromwell, who noted that he had made the trip without prior authorisation from the Parliamentarian government in England.

After the conflict ended in a Royalist defeat, O'Brien enlisted alongside his father in the French Army in 1659. On 20 February 1660, the two were captured by Ottoman corsairs while on board a French Navy fleet destined for Portugal. While his father was soon freed after O'Brien's mother and the Privy Council intervened, O'Brien was held hostage for a year before being freed and returning to England after King Charles II paid his ransom.

== Tangier and Ireland ==
In 1671, O'Brien was appointed as a member of the Irish Privy Council. Three years later, he was chosen to serve as the governor of Tangier and was also appointed as a colonel in the English Army's Tangier Regiment. While he was governor, O'Brien "displayed little military capability"; in 1675, he dispatched a large force from the Tangier Garrison to launch a cattle raid against the Moors, which led to the English suffering 150 casualties.

O'Brien was recalled to England and replaced as governor by Sir Palmes Fairborne in 1680 after failing to prevent the outer fortifications of English Tangier from being overrun by hostile local forces. As noted by historian W. W. Webb, he had frequently been absent from Tangier after the disastrous cattle raid in 1675. After returning to England, O'Brien presented King Charles II with a pair of North African ostriches in order to placate him.

After King James II succeeded to the English throne in 1685, O'Brien was removed from his position on the Irish Privy Council. During the Glorious Revolution of 1688, O'Brien supported the Williamite side. In the first months of 1689, O'Brien fought in Munster alongside the Protestant Boyle family (to whom he was related) against Irish Jacobite soldiers commanded by Richard Talbot, 1st Earl of Tyrconnell during the Williamite War in Ireland.

However, O'Brien's Williamite troops were soon defeated by the Jacobite general Justin McCarthy, Viscount Mountcashel, though McCarthy allowed O'Brien to leave for England via Cork with a large sum of money. This was against King James II's wishes, but Webb speculated that McCarthy's actions may have been influenced by the fact that his father Donough MacCarty, 1st Earl of Clancarty and O'Brien were former comrades-in-arms.

Soon after he had arrived in England, O'Brien was named alongside his son in a bill of attainder known as The Great Act of Attainder, passed by the Patriot Parliament at the behest of King James II to punish his political opponents. While in London, O'Brien met with the new English monarch King William III and offered his services to him. In September 1689, O'Brien was appointed by the king as the governor of the English colonial possession of Jamaica, arriving to the island on 31 May 1690 accompanied by his wife and son.

== Governorship of Jamaica and death ==
Once he had assumed the office (which came with an annual salary of 2,000 pounds), O'Brien spent the next nineteen months as a governor "beset by difficulties, which he struggled to overcome". O'Brien reestablished the fledgling judiciary of Jamaica, which had not been functioning since 1688, in addition to personally suppressing a rebellion by 500 enslaved Africans on a plantation in Jamaica's interior. By 1691, Jamaica was sending annual shipments of Spanish dollars worth 100,000 pounds to England, as O'Brien noted in a report he submitted to the Board of Trade.

Concerned about a possible French attack on Jamaica, O'Brien requested Royal Navy warships from England to be stationed on the island to augment Jamaica's garrison. In the meantime, O'Brien also formed an ad-hoc navy consisting of five newly outfitted sloops and a captured ship in order to counteract French maritime activity from the nearby colony of Saint-Domingue. During his tenure as governor, O'Brien was frequently at odds with the Jamaican governor's council; O'Brien would describe the council's members as a group of "turbulent and pernicious advisers".

While he was in Jamaica, O'Brien amassed a personal fortune of 15,000 pounds; this was alleged by his contemporaries to be made in part by O'Brien's involvement in the profitable slave trade. He was also a supporter of the Jewish community in Jamaica, granting them the privilege of being allowed to conduct trade in the colony on the same terms as non-Jewish merchants. This was resented by many Anglo-Jamaican merchants, a group of whom submitted a petition to the Board of Trade in concert with the Jamaican governor's council after his death to overturn this policy.

In August 1691, O'Brien dissolved the Jamaican House of Assembly after a six-week session, claiming that its members were attempting to "undermine his authority and deprive him of revenue". During the session, O'Brien's proposal for a land tax was rejected, and he refused to support a tax on the slave trade which the assembly's members proposed as an alternative. By this point, his health was deteriorating, and he sought permission to return to England. On 16 January 1692, O'Brien died at Spanish Town of the bloody flux, and his body was buried in the parish church.

After his death, O'Brien was succeeded as governor by John White and John Bourden, though they only served in an acting capacity. Despite O'Brien being King William III's first choice to serve as governor of Jamaica, American historian Richard Slator Dunn noted that he was deeply unpopular among the Jamaican plantocracy. Taking this into consideration, the king appointed William Beeston, a wealthy planter who frequently served as a colonial agent in London (and had been one of the chief lobbyists for Jamaican interests in England) as the new governor of Jamaica.

== Personal life, family and legacy ==
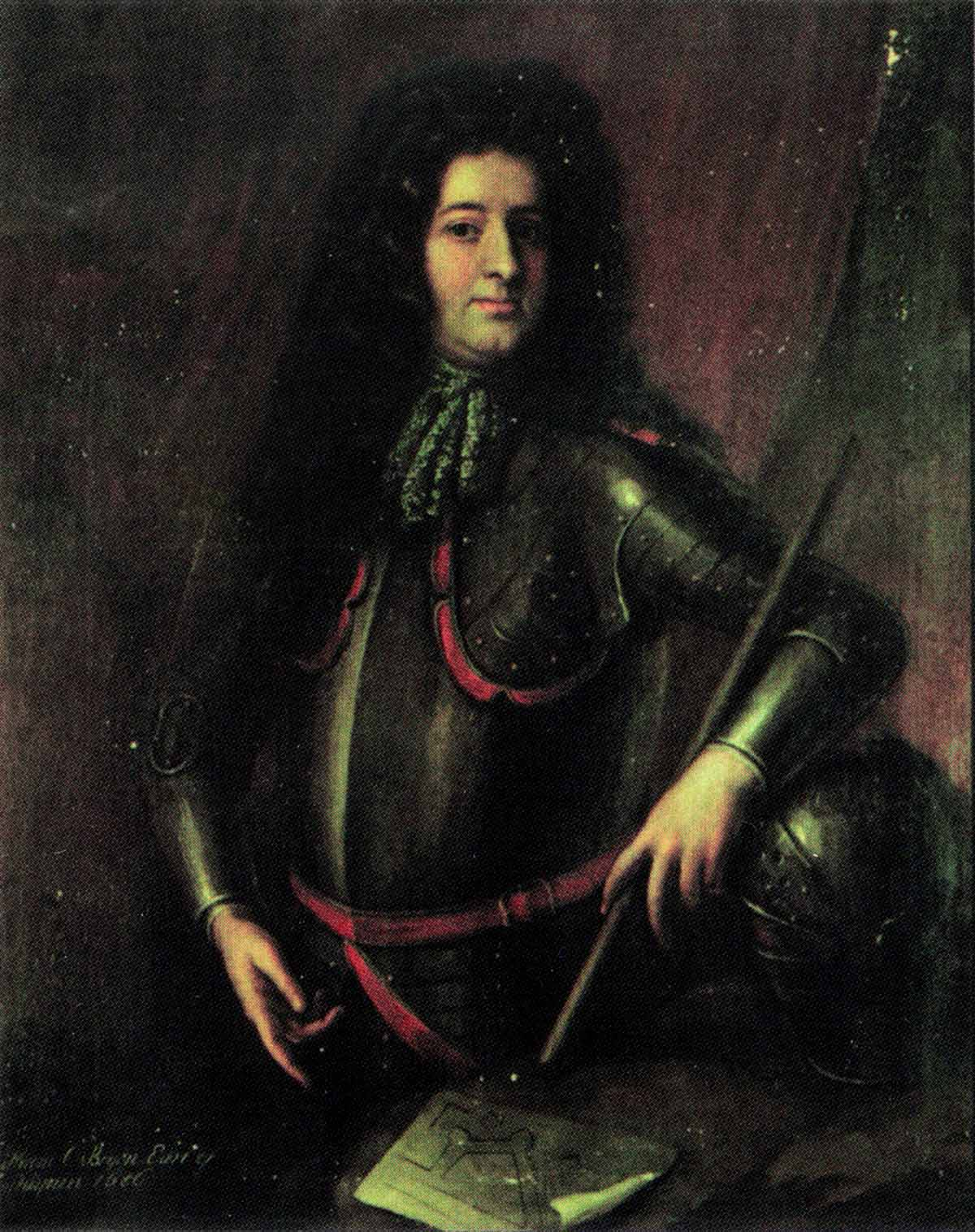
A portrait of William O'Brien c. 1686

O'Brien married twice during his life. The first marriage was to Lady Margaret Boyle, the third daughter of Roger Boyle, 1st Earl of Orrery, which took place in December 1665. He had four children with her, including a son named William, before Margaret died in December 1683. His second wife was Lady Elizabeth Brydges, whom O'Brien married on 1684; she was the daughter of George Brydges, 6th Baron Chandos. The couple had no children during their marriage.

After his father died in 1674, O'Brien succeeded to his title in the peerage of Ireland as the Earl of Inchiquin. O'Brien was also given control over his father's estate, which consisted of 60,000 acres of land in Munster and Rostellan Castle, which O'Brien resided in after returning from Tangier. Despite the valuable estate he inherited, O'Brien was frequently in debt, and unsuccessfully attempted to arrange a marriage between William and a London merchant's daughter.

William succeeded to O'Brien's title in the Irish peerage as the Earl of Inchiquin after he died in 1692. Of O'Brien's other two sons, Henry died in infancy while James died in 1693. William married Mary, the daughter of Sir Edward Villiers. Like his father, William was beset by monetary issues during his lifetime; during the reign of Queen Anne, William complained to the Parliament of Ireland that his financial situation had left him "absolutely encumbered" with debts.

In Jamaica, the memory of O'Brien's governorship became contested after his death. A political opponent of his with a "personal bias" against O'Brien wrote that "No governor ever had so much money in so short a time... nor strove so earnestly to get it". These claims were disputed by O'Brien's personal secretary, who argued that "the very men he delivered from the oppression of a former government... now strive to misrepresent his actions and asperse his memory".

Government offices
Preceded by The Earl of Middleton	Governor of Tangier; 1674–1680	Succeeded by Sir Palmes Fairbourne
Preceded by Francis Watson	Governor of Jamaica; 1690–1692	Succeeded by John White
Peerage of Ireland
Preceded by Murrough O'Brien	Earl of Inchiquin; 1674–1692	Succeeded by William O'Brien
Preceded by Murrough O'Brien	Baron Inchiquin; 1674–1692	Succeeded by William O'Brien
Preceded by Murrough O'Brien	Baron O'Brien; 1674–1692	Succeeded by William O'Brien
