= Khadir Ghaïlan =

17th-century Moroccan warlord

Khadir Ghaïlan (Library of Congress, Ahmad al Khādir ibn 'Ali Ghaylān; generally known to English-speakers as Gayland or Guyland) was a powerful warlord in Morocco during the seventeenth century. He controlled large swathes of the region until his death in September 1672 at the hands of Moulay Rashid. During the 1660s, he was noted for his clashes with the Anglo-Irish garrison at Tangier. Despite gaining a success over the garrison at the Battle of Tangier (1664) he was never able to seriously threaten the port. He agreed a number of truces with the Governors of Tangier.

== Depictions ==
The play The Heir of Morocco, with the Death of Gayland written by Elkanah Settle in 1682 was a political attack on John Dryden, and is entirely fictional in respect of the characters used, with the exception of Gayland, who is loosely based on Ghaïlan.

== Bibliography ==
- Childs, John. The Army of Charles II. Routledge, 1976.
