= Palmes Fairborne =

sir Palmes Fairborne
- Born: c. 1644
- Died: 27 October 1680 (aged 36); Tangier, Morocco
- Military career
- Allegiance: England
- Awards: none

Sir Palmes Fairborne (1644 – 27 October 1680) was an English soldier and Governor of Tangier.

== Early life ==
Fairborne was the son of Colonel Stafford Fairborne of Newark-on-Trent. He fought as a soldier of fortune in Crete at the siege of Candia by the Ottoman Turks; a Turk's head was afterwards included in his arms. At the age of seventeen Fairborne was back in England.

== The Tangier Regiment ==
In the autumn of 1661, he was commissioned a captain in the newly formed Tangier Regiment of Foot. The regiment mustered one thousand strong, besides officers, on Putney Heath, 14 October, and sailed to garrison Tangier, under the command of the Earl of Peterborough, in January 1662. During the next eighteen years Fairborne took a prominent part in the defense of Tangier, which was exposed to attacks from the Moors, receiving the honour of knighthood for his services.

By 1664, he had risen to the rank of major, and in 1667, he fought a duel with a brother officer. The account Fairborne gives of the condition of the city in his letters home is deplorable; stores and victuals ran short, and constant desertions took place. Fairborne rode on one occasion alone into the enemy's lines, and brought a deserter back in triumph on his horse (26 December 1669).

Knighted in April 1675 and in May 1676, he was made joint deputy-governor in the absence of William O'Brien, 2nd Earl of Inchiquin, and on the death (21 November) of his coadjutor, Colonel Allsop, he had the sole command for the next two years. Under Fairborne, improvements took place both in the discipline of the garrison and in the construction of the mole for defence of the harbour. But pay was two years and a quarter in arrears; in December 1677 a mutiny took place. Fairborne wrenched a musket from a leading mutineer and shot him dead on the spot.

During some point during his service at Tangier, he fought a duel with Colonel John Fitzgerald.

== Governor of Tangier ==
In the spring of 1678 Fairborne went to England. Two years later, 25 March 1680, the Moors under their Sultan Ismail Ibn Sharif (Muley Hassan), blockaded Tangier, and Fairborne returned early in April to conduct the defence as sole governor and commander-in-chief. In July a new governor, Thomas Butler, 6th Earl of Ossory, was appointed over Fairborne's head, in Inchiquin's place. Fairborne petitioned in August that his pay as commander-in-chief might not be taken away. Ossory died on 30 July, and Fairborne remained as sole defender of Tangier.

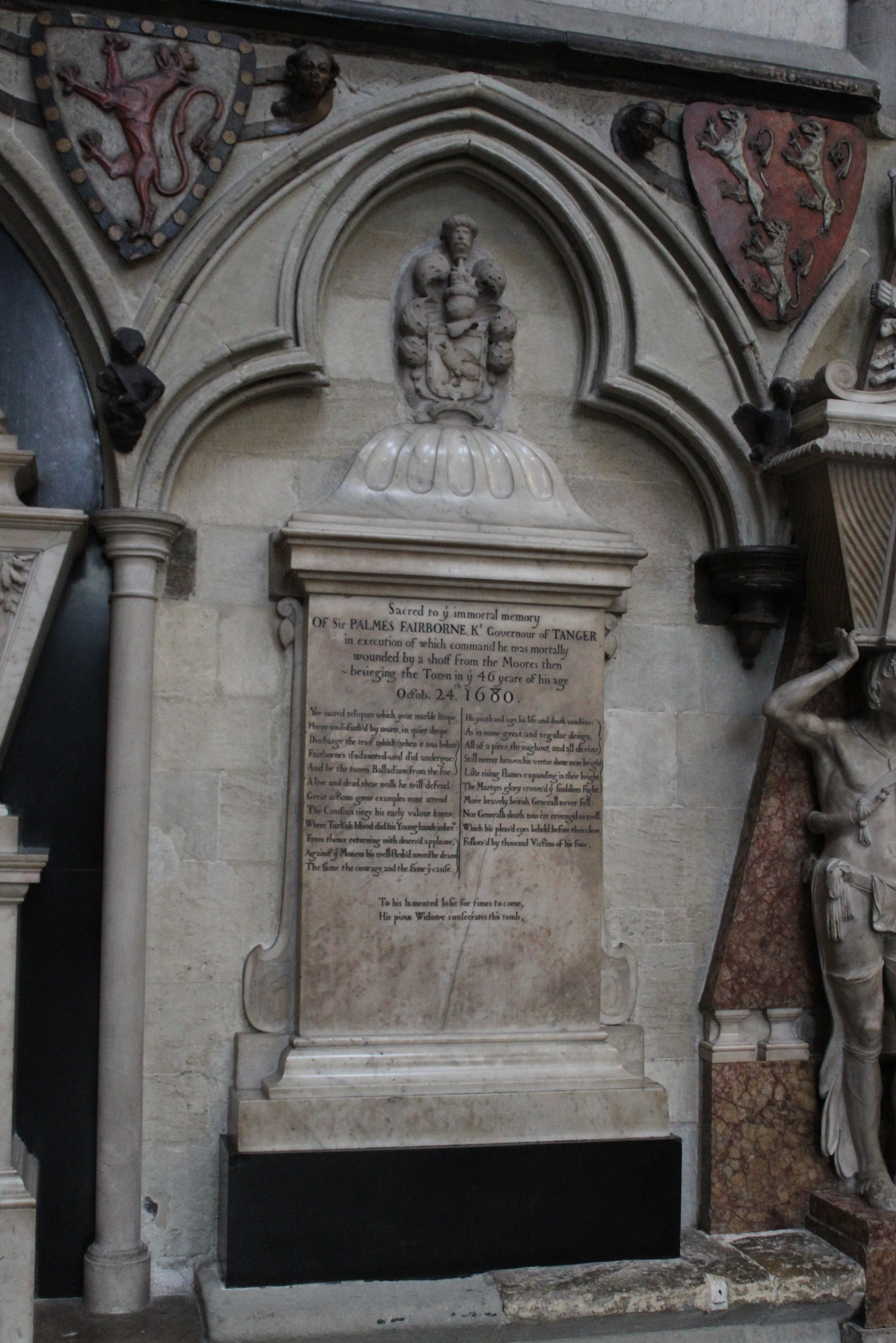
Fairborne's memorial in Westminster Abbey

== Death ==
The Moors made a further attack in October. On 24 October, Fairborne, riding out of the town to inspect the defences, took part in a slight skirmish and was mortally wounded by a shot. After three days' fighting, which the dying governor watched from a balcony, the Moors were forced to raise the siege and repulsed with great loss, while Fairborne, lingering until the evening of 27 October, saw his troops march into the town. An account was given of his dying speech in a paper called The Tangiers Rescue, by John Ross, 1681. Three years after Fairborne's death Tangier was abandoned to the Moors, and the fortifications razed to the ground.

== Family ==
By his wife, Margaret (née Devereux; formerly having been married to a Mr Mansell), he had a large family, left in poverty after his death. But, in 1681, the king granted Lady Fairborne an annuity of £500; their eldest son, Stafford Fairborne, became a knight and rear-admiral.

Lady Fairborne later remarried Jasper Paston, son of Robert Paston, 1st Earl of Yarmouth. In 1680 she erected a monument in the nave of Westminster Abbey to Fairborne, by the sculptor John Bushnell, with an epitaph by John Dryden recounting his exploits. Lady Fairborne died in 1698, and was buried in Westminster Abbey.

Military offices
Preceded by The Earl of Inchiquin	Governor of Tangier; 1680–1680	Succeeded by Thomas Butler, 6th Earl of Ossory
Preceded by The Earl of Inchiquin	Colonel of the Tangier Regiment; 1680–1682	Succeeded by Percy Kirke
