= Andrew Rutherford, 1st Earl of Teviot =

Scottish general

The Right Honourable The Earl of Teviot

Governor of Tangier
- In office 1663–1664
- Preceded by: Henry Mordaunt
- Succeeded by: Sir Tobias Bridges

Personal details
- Born: Andrew Rutherfurd Restalrig, Edinburgh, Kingdom of Scotland
- Died: 4 May 1664 Jews' Mount, Tangier, Morocco
- Spouse: Susanna de Melville
- Education: Edinburgh University

Military service
- Allegiance: France, England
- Rank: Colonel général des Ecossais
- Unit: Garde Écossaise, Tangier Regiment
- Battles/wars: Relief of Thionville; Battle of Lens (1648); Civil wars of the Fronde

Andrew Rutherford, 1st Earl of Teviot (died 4 May 1664; sometimes spelt "Rutherfurd") was a Scottish soldier.

== Early life ==
Andrew was the fifth and youngest son of a merchant burgess of Edinburgh—William Rutherfurd (died 1624) of Wrightslands and of Easter and Wester Quarrelholes in Restalrig—and his wife Isobel (married 1608), daughter of James Stewart of Traquair. He received his education at Edinburgh University, and later took up a career in the military in France.

== Career ==
During the Commonwealth (or, to monarchists, the Interregnum), Rutherford served the French government, which maintained regiments of Scottish soldiers throughout the Thirty Years's War. On the restoration of Charles II, Rutherford was taken into employment by his own king on the recommendation of Louis XIV of France. According to the Encyclopædia Britannica Eleventh Edition, he became a lieutenant general in France and had a high reputation for personal courage; however, the Dictionary of National Biography states that he "never rose beyond the rank of colonel in French service, and was certainly not promoted to the prestigious rank of lieutenant général."

Rutherford returned to Scotland in 1660. In 1661 Charles II gave him the Scottish title of Lord Rutherfurd and the governorship of Dunkirk, which had been acquired by the Protector Oliver Cromwell. When Charles II sold the town to France in 1662 Rutherford was consoled by the command of the Colony of Tangier and the Tangier Regiment, and was made Earl of Teviot.

He was sent in 1663 as governor to Tangier. His tenure of office was very short, for on 4 May 1664 he was trapped at the Battle of Tangier in an ambush by the Moors, who had been carrying out incessant irregular warfare against the English garrison, and was killed, together with nineteen officers and nearly five hundred men of the garrison.

== Personal life ==
On 18 April 1651, Rutherfurd was married to Susanna de Melville at Migueri in the Châtelain of Bois Commune in France.

By his death without lawful male issue the earldom of Teviot became extinct; but on 23 December 1663 he had executed at Portsmouth a general settlement of his estates and dignities to his cousin Sir Thomas Rutherford of Hunthill, who on 16 December 1665 was served heir in his title of Lord Rutherford and also in his lands.

=== Legacy ===
In his will he donated funds to his former university in Edinburgh, for the construction of eight chambers, and gave directions that a Latin inscription which he had composed should be placed upon the building.

Military offices
Preceded by Henry Mordaunt	Governor of Tangier; 1663–1664	Succeeded by Sir Tobias Bridges
Preceded by Henry Mordaunt	Colonel of the Tangier Regiment; 1663–1664	Succeeded by Henry Norwood
Peerage of Scotland
New creation	Earl of Teviot; 1663–1664	Extinct
New creation	Lord Rutherford; 1661–1664	Extinct
