= Marriage Treaty =

1661 treaty of alliance England and Portugal

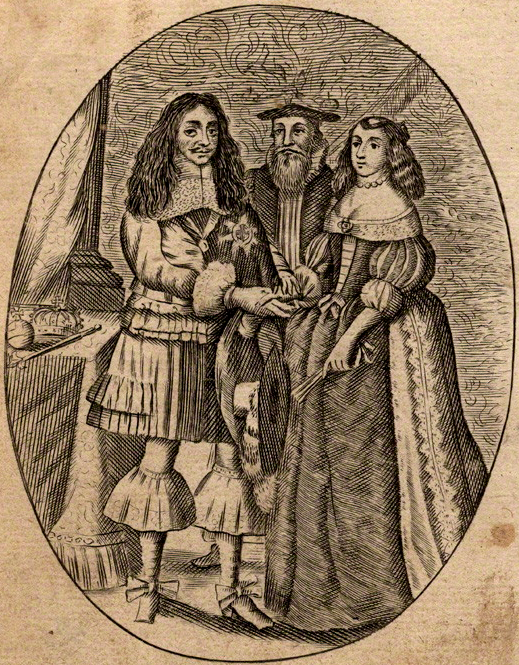
The wedding of King Charles II and Catherine of Braganza.

The Marriage Treaty, or Anglo-Portuguese Treaty, was a treaty of alliance that was agreed between the Kingdom of England and the Kingdom of Portugal and concluded on 23 June 1661.

It led to the marriage of Charles II of England and Catherine of Braganza, the daughter of John IV of Portugal. It was a marriage of state, as was common in the era.

The treaty also renewed the medieval Anglo-Portuguese Alliance.

== Background ==
Charles had recently been restored to the thrones of England, Scotland and Ireland and had been lobbied by both Portugal and Spain, which pushed rival candidates, who were the Danish princess Anna Sophie of Denmark, the Dutch princess Maria of Orange-Nassau, the Italian princess Caterina Farnese, the Italian princess Eleonore Gonzaga, Empress Dowager of the Holy Roman Empire, and the German princess Hedwig Eleonora of Holstein-Gottorp, Queen Dowager of Sweden, as potential wives. There was a religious controversy among the members of the Spanish government, who wondered how they could propose Protestant brides (such as the Dutch princess of Orange) when the Spanish were staunchly Catholics and loathed the Protestant faith, but they came to the conclusion that it was necessary in order to break the Anglo-Portuguese alliance. Although Charles had been allied to Spain through the Treaty of Brussels, his relations with Madrid had become increasingly strained. Spain demanded the return of possessions taken by the English Republic, notably Jamaica, which Charles accepted. Charles's decision to marry Catherine was attributed to the advice of the influential English statesman Edward Hyde, 1st Earl of Clarendon. The Portuguese match also received strong support from Charles's Irish ally James Butler, 1st Duke of Ormonde.

== Terms ==
As well as a cash payment, Catherine's dowry also brought with it the settlements of Bombay. England also gained Tangier, in North Africa, and so could use the port as a naval station or a commercial post for the Levante trade.

The terms made England send 2,000 foot soldiers and 500 horses to assist Portugal's war against Spain. The treaty, under the marriage provision, also stated that the Infanta and her whole family "shall enjoy the free exercise of the Roman Catholic religion."

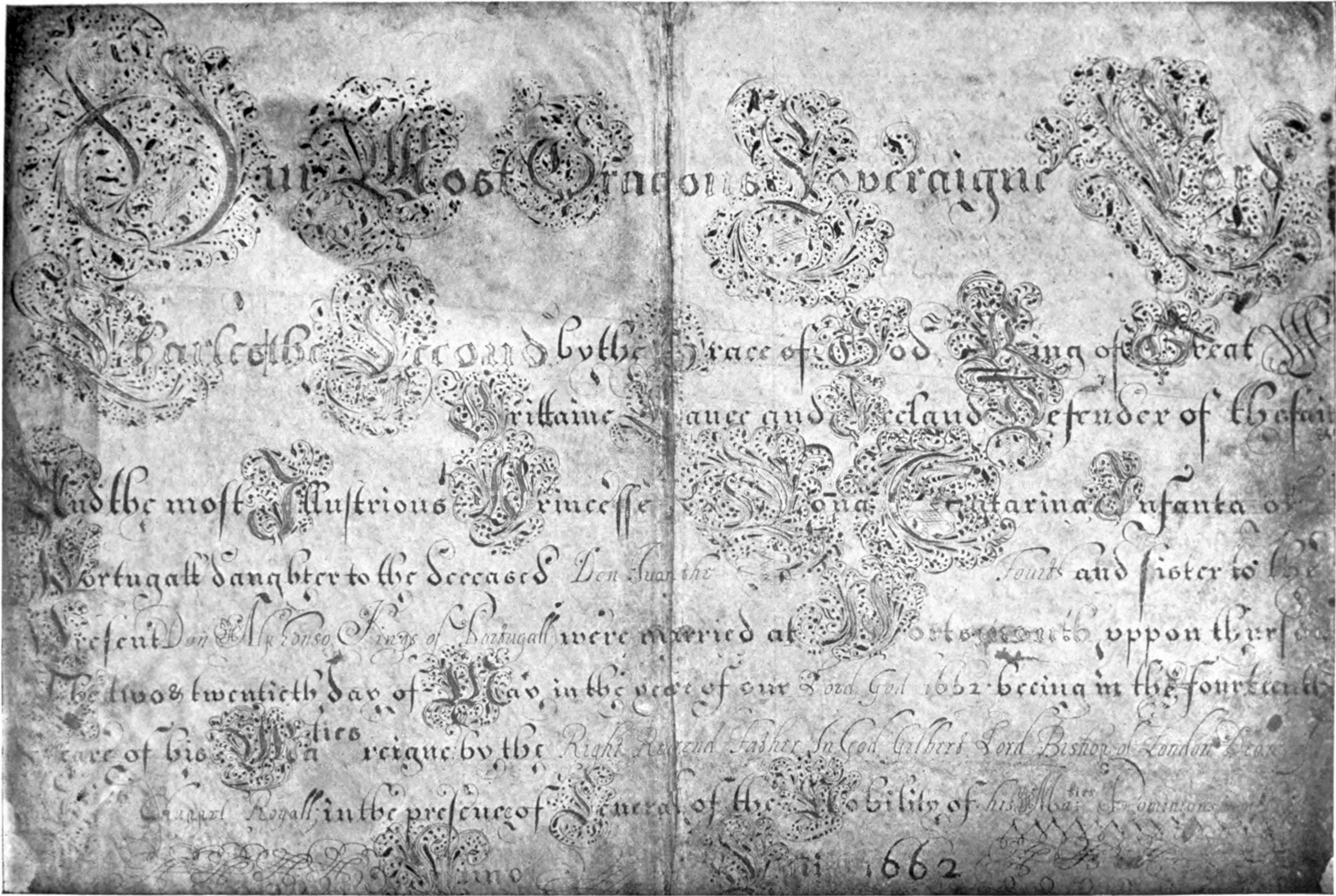
The marriage certificate of King Charles II and Catherine of Braganza.

Over time, however, the acquisition of the two territories came to be regarded as liabilities for England. Charles sold his rights over Bombay to the East India Company. Tangier was maintained until it was evacuated by 1684 under constant pressure from surrounding Moorish forces. It also became a source of political controversy in England since Whigs suggested that the garrison, which had a large number of Irish Catholics, was designed to be brought over to Britain to impose royal absolutism.

In accordance with the agreement, a force of British and Irish troops under Frederick Schomberg were raised to serve in Portugal's ongoing war against Spain. Portugal secured its independence in 1668.

Charles and Catherine were unable to conceive a child and so in 1685, the throne passed to the King's brother James, Duke of York, who married Anne Hyde and later Mary of Modena.

== Bibliography ==
- John, Childs (1976). The Army of Charles II. University Of Toronto Press. ISBN 978-0415846110.
- Davenport, Frances Gardiner; Paullin, Charles Oscar, eds. (2004). European Treaties Bearing on the History of the United States and Its Dependencies: Issue 254. The Lawbook Exchange, Ltd. ISBN 9781584774228.
