= William Lockhart of Lee =

Scottish army officer, politician and diplomat

Sir William Lockhart PC
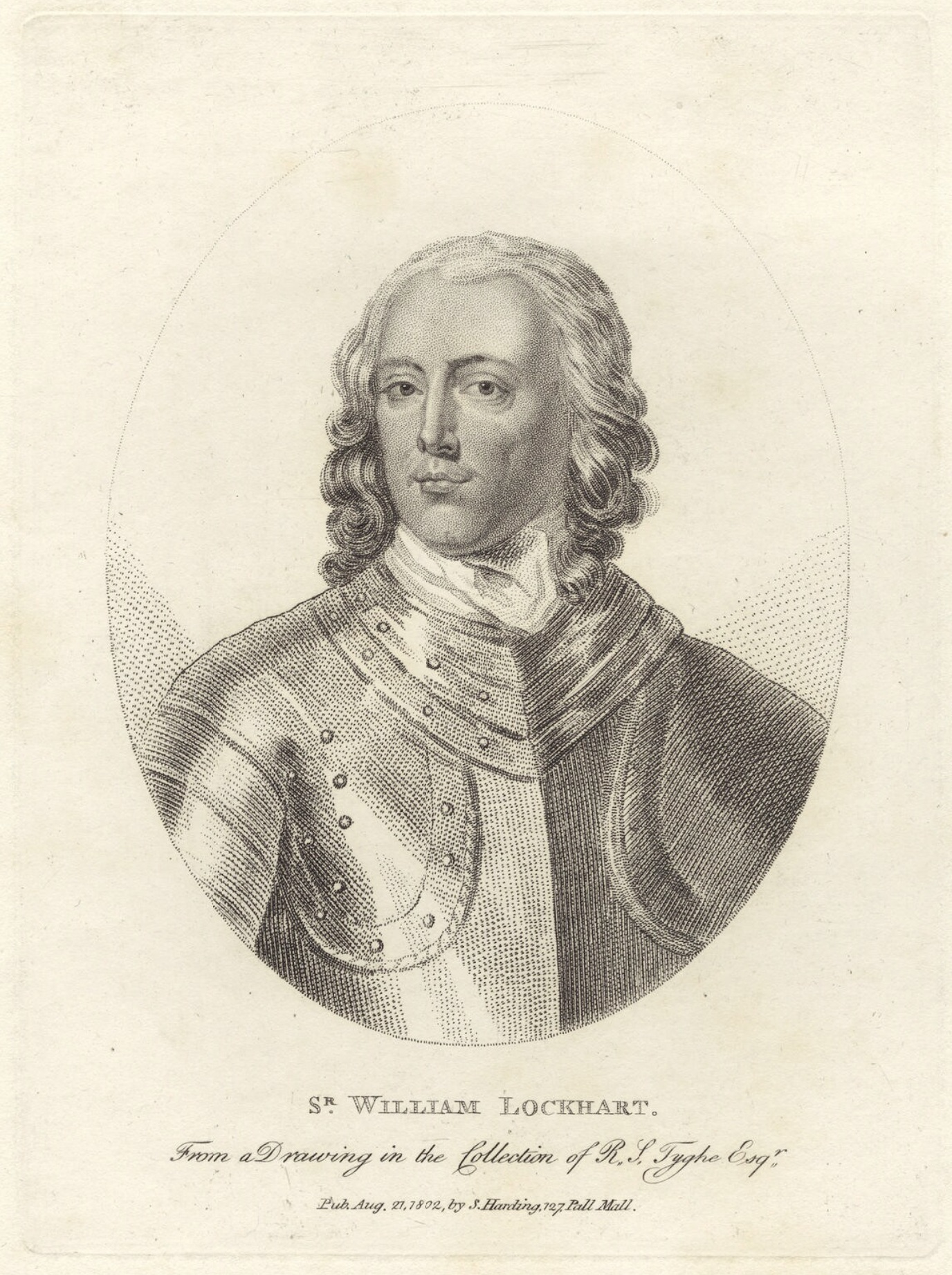
- 1802 portrait

English ambassador to France
- In office 1673–1675
- Monarch: Charles II
- Preceded by: Edward Spragge
- Succeeded by: Baron Berkeley

MP for Lanarkshire
- In office 1669–1672

Ambassador to France
- In office 1656–1660

Governor of Dunkirk
- In office 1658–1660

MP for Lanarkshire
- In office 1654–1658

Personal details
- Born: c. 1621 Lee Castle, Lanarkshire, Scotland
- Died: 1 June 1675 (aged 54) Paris, France
- Spouse(s): Martha Hamilton (died 1654); Robina Sewster
- Children: Five sons, two daughters
- Parent(s): Sir James Lockhart; Martha Douglas
- Committees: Commissioner for Justice, 1654

Sir William Lockhart of Lee (1621 – 1 June 1675) was a Scottish army officer, politician and diplomat who fought for the Covenanters during the 1638 to 1651 Wars of the Three Kingdoms. Following Royalist defeat in the 1642 to 1647 First English Civil War, Lockhart took part in negotiations between Charles I and Scottish Engagers, who agreed to restore him to the English throne.

The Engagers were defeated and Charles executed in January 1649. Captured at Wigan in 1648, Lockhart was released in 1649 but excluded by the Kirk Party when they invaded England in order to restore Charles II. This ended with defeat in 1651 and Scotland was incorporated into the English Commonwealth in 1654.

After his marriage to Oliver Cromwell's niece in 1654, Lockhart was appointed to a number of diplomatic and political posts under the Commonwealth. These included Commissioner for Justice in Scotland and English ambassador to France from 1656 to 1660. In this role, he helped negotiate the 1657 Treaty of Paris, an Anglo-French alliance against Spain. He also commanded Commonwealth troops at the 1658 Battle of the Dunes, later serving as Governor of Dunkirk.

Unlike many who held office under the Commonwealth, he escaped punishment following the Restoration of Charles II, but lost most of his offices. In 1673, the Duke of Lauderdale had him re-appointed as the English ambassador to France; he died in Paris in June 1675.

== Life ==
Coat of arms of the Lockharts of Lee: Argent a man’s heart proper within a fetterlock sable, on a chief azure three boar’s heads erased of the first.

William Lockhart was born in 1621, the eldest of nine children born to Sir James Lockhart, and his second wife, Martha Douglas, maid of honour to Queen Henrietta Maria.

After his first wife Martha Hamilton died in 1654, he married Robina Sewster, whose first husband had been distantly related to Oliver Cromwell; they had five sons and two daughters. These included Cromwell, Julius, killed at Tangier in 1680, Richard and John, who died without issue, and James, who ultimately succeeded. Their two daughters were Martha, maid of honour to Princess Mary, and Robina, who married Archibald Douglas, 1st Earl of Forfar.

== Career ==
Lockhart reportedly ran away from school when he was 13 and made his way to Danzig, where his relative Sir George Douglas was Ambassador to Poland. He escorted Douglas' body home for burial after his death in 1636 and spent the next few years in Europe. He joined the French army and became a captain of horse, before returning to Scotland in 1644, during the First English Civil War.

Appointed lieutenant-colonel in the Earl of Lanark's regiment, he served in the Covenanter army that campaigned against Montrose, Royalist commander in Scotland. In late 1645, he transferred to the Scottish army based at Newark, and was present when Charles surrendered to Lord Leven in May 1646. He carried messages between the king and Duke of Hamilton, who negotiated on behalf of the Engagers, and was knighted as a result.

In December 1647, Charles agreed to impose Presbyterianism in England for three years and suppress the Independents, but his refusal to take the Covenant himself split the Scots. It was not until April 1648 the Engagers achieved a majority in the Scottish Parliament; the Kirk Party did not trust Charles, objected to an alliance with English and Scots Royalists, and denounced the Engagement as 'sinful.'

In June 1648, Lockhart commanded a cavalry regiment in an Engager army of 9,000 that marched into England. The Second English Civil War involved a series of Royalist risings in England and Wales, with the Scots providing support; by the time the Scots entered Lancashire in early August, the other revolts had been suppressed and the Engagers were defeated at Preston on 19 August.

As part of the rearguard that enabled some of the Scots to escape, Lockhart was captured and held in Hull for a year. He was released after paying a fine of £1,000; he returned to Scotland but the 1649 Act of Classes passed by the Kirk Party banned former Engagers from political or military office. This meant he played no part in the Third English Civil War, an attempt by the Kirk Party to restore Charles II to the English throne.

== Diplomat ==
While on a visit to London Lockhart had an interview with Oliver Cromwell, and on 18 May 1652 he was appointed one of Cromwell's commissioners for the administration of justice in Scotland. He was also nominated a trustee for the disposing of forfeited estates, and was sworn a member of the Scottish privy council. In 1653, 1654–5, and 1656–8 he represented Lanarkshire in the Protectorate parliaments in Westminster and from 1672 to 1674 represented the county in the Parliament of Scotland at Edinburgh.

Lockhart was appointed in December 1655 English ambassador in Paris, but did not set out till April 1656. He filled this office till the death of Cromwell. His correspondence was printed in the Thurloe State Papers. The main purpose of his mission was to confirm the alliance with France against Spain, and to prevent aid to the Stuart family. An alliance with England was distasteful to France, both on political and religious grounds; and Lockhart had a difficult task in maintaining it. Much of his success was due to his handling of Cardinal Mazarin. On 23 March 1656–7 a new offensive and defensive treaty was signed, by which France was to contribute twenty thousand men, and England, in addition to her fleet, six thousand, to carry on the war against Spanish Flanders. It was further agreed to attack the three coast towns of Gravelines, Mardyke, and Dunkirk, the first of which was to fall to France and the two others to England.

== Governor of Dunkirk ==
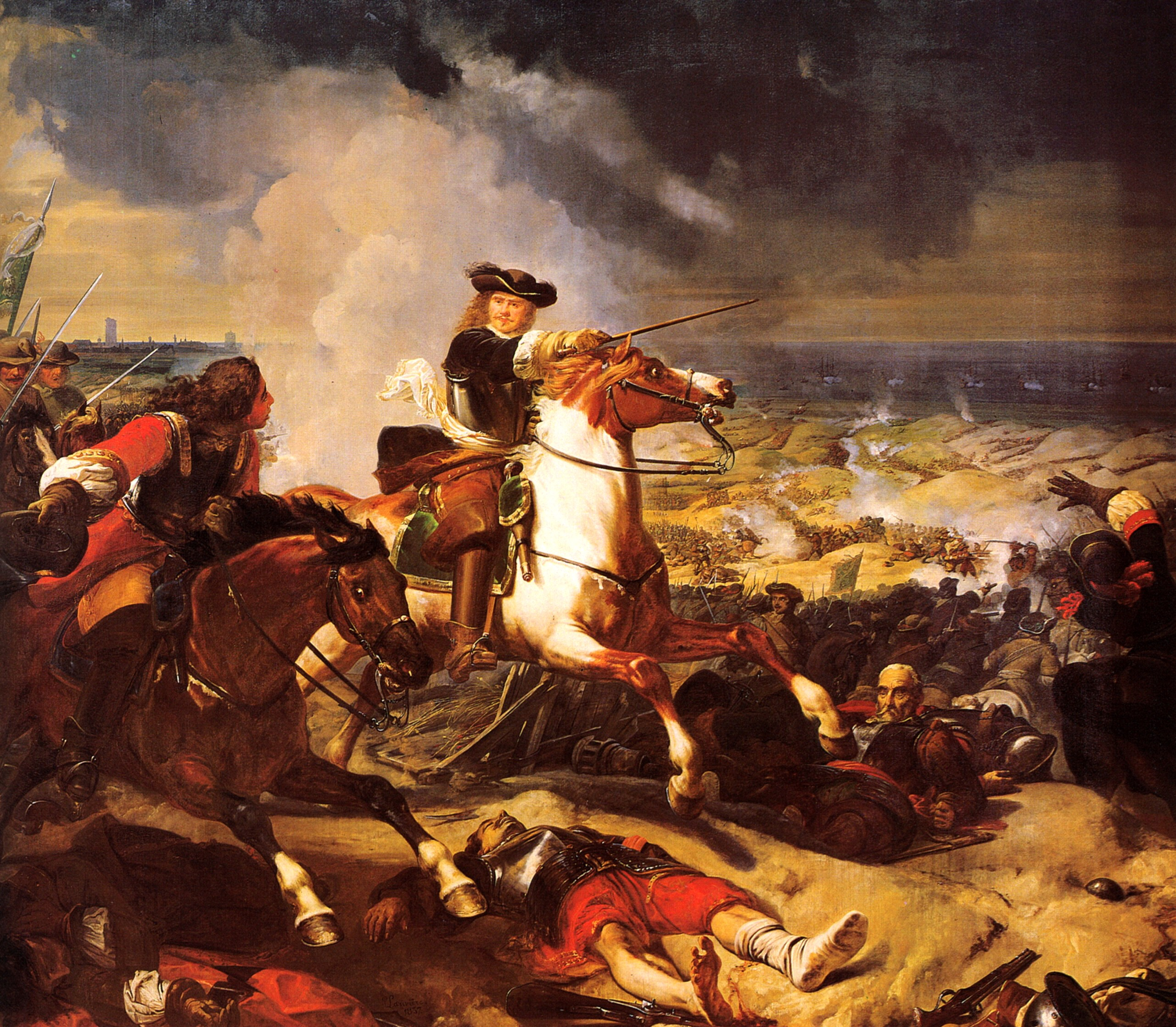
The Battle of the Dunes by Charles-Philippe Larivière. Lockhart commanded British Commonwealth forces allied to the French at the 1658 Battle of the Dunes, inflicting a significant defeat against the Spanish and their allies in the British Royalist Army in Exile.

With the signing of the treaty Lockhart's difficulties had only begun. The French laid siege in September to Fort Mardyke, which was taken and handed over to the English before the end of the month. Lockhart urged on Turenne the necessity of proceeding immediately to the siege of Dunkirk, but this was delayed till June 1658, by which time the Spaniards had strongly entrenched their position. On the death of Sir John Reynolds, the English general, Lockhart undertook the command of the English forces, and in the pitched battle before Dunkirk he charged the Spanish foot. The town was surrendered on 15 June, and on the 24th handed over to Lockhart, who was made governor by Cromwell, and proceeded to put it in a state of defence. He received no assistance from the French.

Shortly after the capture of Dunkirk, Lockhart intervened successfully for the protection of the Huguenots in Nîmes.

After the resignation of Richard Cromwell Lockhart was continued by the Commonwealth ambassador in France. He took part as the English plenipotentiary in the negotiations which resulted in the treaty of the Pyrenees, and immediately on its conclusion went to England, where he had an interview with George Monck. Monck assured him that he intended to support the Commonwealth, and Lockhart accordingly refused to permit Charles II to come to Dunkirk. He also, according to Clarendon, turned down French inducements to hand over Dunkirk.

== Under Charles II ==
After the Restoration Lockhart was deprived of the government of Dunkirk, but through the intercession of Middleton he was not further molested. In 1662 Dunkirk was sold to the French. He lived for some years in retirement on his Scottish estate, but finding that his former relations with Cromwell rendered him an object of suspicion to his neighbours, he took up his residence with his wife's relations in Huntingdonshire.

In 1671 Lockhart was brought to court by the Earl of Lauderdale, and through his influence was sent to the courts of Brandenburg and Lunenburg to secure their neutrality or co-operation on the formation of the alliance of France against Holland. Lockhart, according to Gilbert Burnet, became very uneasy when he fathomed the negotiations in which he was engaged. He then was reappointed to the embassy in France. He died on 20 March 1676.

== Sources ==
- Henderson, Thomas Finlayson (1893). "Lockhart, William (1621-1676)" . In Lee, Sidney (ed.). Dictionary of National Biography. Vol. 34. London: Smith, Elder & Co.
- Mitchison, Rosalind (2002). A history of Scotland. Routledge. ISBN 0-203-31697-5. OCLC 52084492.
- Royle, Trevor (2005). Civil War: The War of the Three Kingdoms 1638-1660. Abacus. ISBN 0349115648.
- Venning, Timothy (2004). "Lockhart, William [created Sir William Lockhart under the protectorate]". Oxford Dictionary of National Biography (Online ed.). Oxford University Press. doi:10.1093/ref:odnb/16907. (Subscription, Wikipedia Library access or UK public library membership required.)
