= Treaty of Brussels (1656) =

Treaty between Spain and English Royalists (1656)

The Treaty of Brussels was an agreement between representatives of Philip IV of Spain and Charles II, the leader of the exiled royalists of England, Ireland, and Scotland. It was signed in Brussels, in the Spanish Netherlands, on 2 April 1656. James Butler 1st Marquess of Ormonde and Henry Wilmot, 1st Earl of Rochester signed on behalf of Charles. Alonso de Cárdenas, a former Spanish ambassador to London, signed on behalf of Philip.

== Background ==
The exiled royalists had been close to the French court, but the 1655 alliance between the Commonwealth of England and the Kingdom of France forced them to leave France and drove them into the arms of Spain. Charles II first moved his court to Cologne, then in March 1656 to Brussels. An agreement between Charles II of England and Philip IV of Spain was negotiated.

It was signed on 2 April (O.S.) or 12 April (N.S.) 1656 for Charles II by James Butler, 1st Marquess of Ormond (who later became duke) and Henry Wilmot, 1st Earl of Rochester. It was signed for Philip IV by Alonso de Cárdenas and Alfonso Pérez de Vivero, 3rd Count of Fuensaldaña. Philip ratified it on 5 June in Madrid. This contract in fact updated and extended a similar treaty of 1630.

== Terms ==
In exchange for future Spanish military support for a potential restoration, Charles agreed to raise forces to fight for Spain in the ongoing Franco-Spanish War (1635–1659). He also pledged to stop English colonisation in the Caribbean and to return any territory that would be taken by the Commonwealth from Spain. He also agreed to help Spain fight against Portugal's attempt to regain independence.

== Aftermath ==
In 1657, the Commonwealth signed the Treaty of Paris with France, which formalised the developing Anglo-French alliance. Charles's alliance with the nation's traditional enemy, Spain, further undermined his support with the English public.

Nonetheless, royalist supporters joined the Royalist Army in Exile in significant numbers, led by his younger brother James, Duke of York. Large numbers of Irish troops deserted from the French army to serve under the Duke of York in the hope that they could invade England. However, their hopes were largely dashed by the Spanish defeat to Anglo-French forces at the Battle of the Dunes (1658) and the surrender of Dunkirk.

Spain then made peace with France at the Treaty of the Pyrenees in 1659, and even the death of Oliver Cromwell the previous year did not lead to the immediate collapse of the Commonwealth.

In 1660, Charles was restored to the crown with the assistance of English troops of the New Model Army, under George Monck. The failure of Spain, however, to assist Charles' return to London meant that he did not feel bound by the treaty and so he annulled it.

Under Charles, English settlement in the Americas continued to grow. In 1662, he made a dynastic marriage with the Portuguese Catharine of Braganza and supported Portugal's successful campaign for independence. The territory that was taken by England from Spain before 1660 was either kept or sold. Jamaica was turned into an English colony, and Charles sold Dunkirk to his cousin Louis XIV.

== Sources ==
- Aubrey, Philip (1990). Mr Secretary Thurloe. London: Athlone Press. ISBN 0-485-11347-3. – (Snippet view)
- Childs, John (2007). The Williamite Wars in Ireland 1688–1691. London: Hambledon Continuum Press. ISBN 978-1-85285-573-4. – (Preview)
- Fraser, Antonia (1980) [1st pub. 1979]. Royal Charles: Charles II and the Restoration. New York: Dell Publishing. ISBN 0-440-56960-5.
- Macray, Rev. W. Dunn, ed. (1876). Calendar of the Clarendon State Papers. Vol. III. Oxford: Clarendon Press. OCLC 1041641193. – 1655 to 1657
- Davenport, Frances Gardiner; Paullin, Charles Oscar, eds. (2004). European Treaties Bearing on the History of the United States and Its Dependencies: Issue 254. The Lawbook Exchange, Ltd. ISBN 9781584774228.
- Seel, Graham E (2005). The English Wars and Republic, 1637–1660. Routledge. ISBN 9781134638574.
