= Second Ormonde Peace =

1649 treaty in Ireland

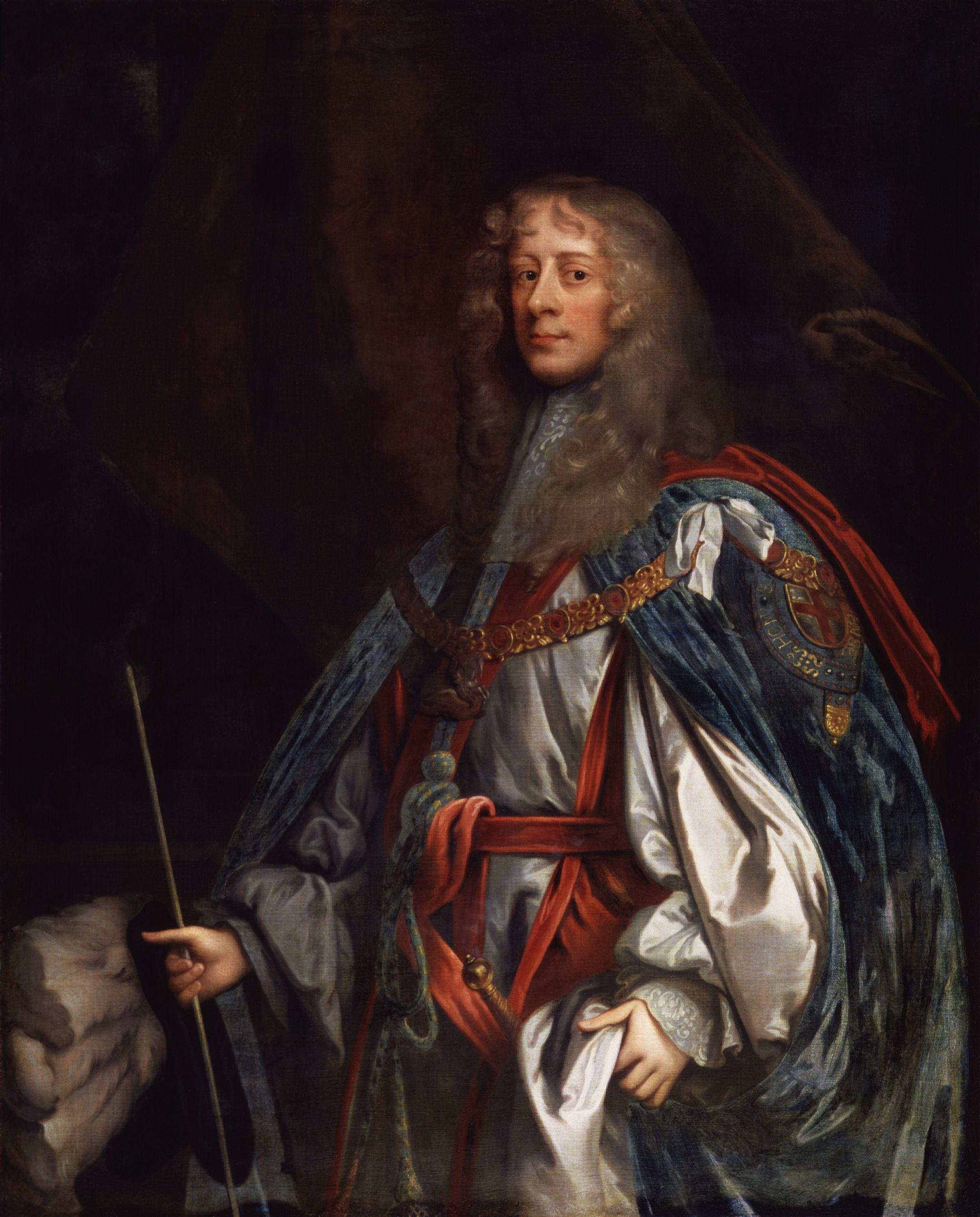
The King's Irish commander the Marquess of Ormonde signed the agreement on his behalf and led Allied forces during the 1649 campaign.

The Second Ormonde Peace was a peace treaty and alliance signed on 17 January 1649 between the Marquess of Ormonde, the leader of the Irish Royalists, and the Irish Confederates. It united a coalition of former Protestants and Catholics enemies from Ireland, Scotland and England – the three Kingdoms ruled by Charles I who was then held a prisoner by the Puritan Rump Parliament. His execution on 30 January drew together the signatories in allegiance to his young son Charles II.

The agreement was widely accepted by Catholics across Ireland, many of whom believed their previous rising had been authorised by the old King. However it was opposed by Owen Roe O'Neill and much of his Ulster Army who instead formed a temporary alliance with the Anglo-Irish Parliamentary forces, relieving their besieged garrison at Derry. When this agreement expired O'Neill's forces then changed sides. In the wake of the vigorous Cromwellian conquest of Ireland the combined forces of the alliance were comprehensively defeated and Ireland was under republican control until the 1660 restoration. A number of the surviving soldiers loyal to Charles II later served in his Royalist Army in Exile.

== Background ==
While proclaiming their loyalty to Charles I, the Catholic Confederates had followed the 1641 Rebellion by seizing strongholds throughout Ireland and seeking to secure concessions from the government. Meanwhile a Civil War broke out in England between the King and his opponents. In 1643 a truce with the Confederates known as the Cessation of Arms had freed Anglo-Irish Royalist troops to fight in the English Civil War. After lengthy negotiations the First Ormonde Peace was agreed in 1646 between Charles' envoy and the Irish Confederates. This however provoked a civil war in Catholic Ireland between the Moderate and Clerical factions of the Irish Confederacy. The former Spanish mercenary Owen Roe O'Neill who commanded the Ulster Army, had intervened on behalf of the anti-Treaty forces which thwarted the implementation of the agreement. Meanwhile the situation of Charles in Britain had declined. He surrendered to the Scottish Covenanters in 1646 who then handed him over to the English Parliamentary forces. By late 1648 the Irish Catholics and Royalists and the Scottish Covenanters had all come to see the London Parliament as their greatest threat. Following the defeat of his supporters during the Second Civil War, Charles I was executed by the English Parliament who declared both England and Ireland to be a republic.

== Treaty and effects ==
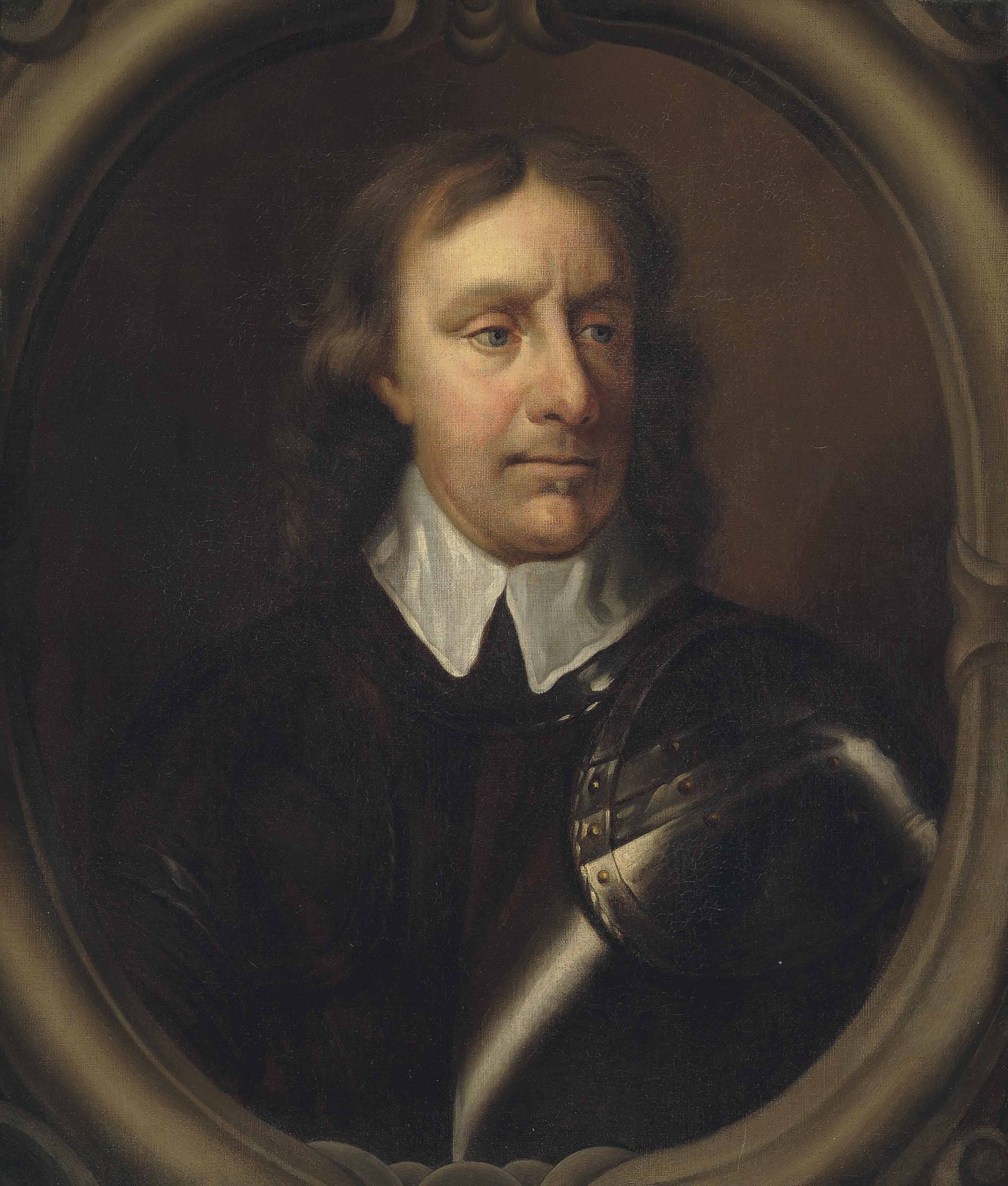
Cromwell's campaign in Ireland shattered the coalition that had been formed by Ormonde's treaty.

In Ulster, O'Neill moved to relieved the besieged troops of Charles Coote who were trapped in Derry. Meanwhile the allies secured many of the town and cities across Ireland and Ormonde's troops advanced to lay siege to the capital Dublin. However even before the arrival of Oliver Cromwell's reinforcements, his local Irish commander Michael Jones routed the coalition forces at the Battle of Rathmines. Cromwell then took the offensive, storming Drogheda and then Wexford. In the north the Catholic Ulster Army now changed sides to join the other allies, but were routed and virtually destroyed at the Battle of Scarrifholis. The Scottish Covenanter Army in the North had previously been smashed at the Lisnagarvey. Ormonde left Ireland, turning over command to the Catholic Royalist Lord Clanricarde. However organised resistance effectively ceased following the loss of Galway and further resistance was largely carried out by a guerilla war.

Ormonde and a group of leading Irish Catholics went into exile along with a number of troops. Four regiments that fought at the Battle of the Dunes were broadly drawn from former members of the Allied forces of 1649, topped up by fresh recruits from Ireland. Ormond was ultimately restored as Lord Lieutenant while many Catholics successfully appealed to the Court of Claims to have land returned to them that had been confiscated by Cromwell due to their service in the Royalist alliance.

== Bibliography ==
- Casway, Jerrold I. Owen Roe O'Neill and the Struggle for Catholic Ireland. University of Pennsylvania Press, 1984.
- Nolan, Cathal J. The Age of Wars of Religion, 1000–1650: An Encyclopedia of Global Warfare and Civilization, Volume 2. Greenwood Publishing Group, 2006.
- O Siochru, Micheal. Confederate Ireland, 1642–1649. A Constitutional and Political Analysis. Four Courts Press, 1999.
- Whittock, Martyn. When God was King: Rebels & Radicals of the Civil War & Mayflower Generation. Lion Books, 2018.
