= The Fronde =

Civil wars in France between 1648 and 1653

- Part of the Franco-Spanish War (1635–1659)
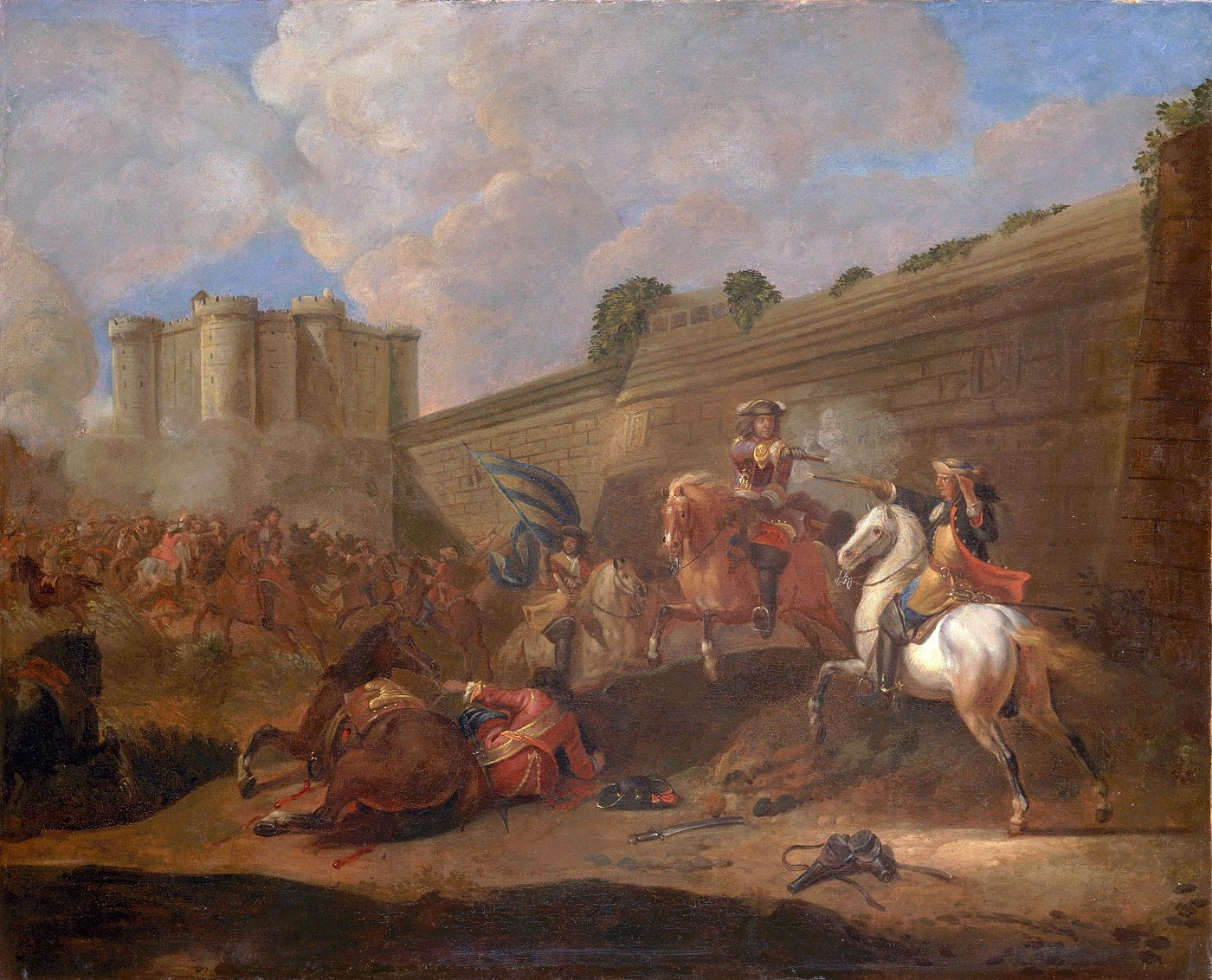
- Battle of the Faubourg St Antoine, 1652, outside the Bastille in Paris
Date	1648–1653
Location	France
Result	Government victory

Belligerents
Kingdom of France	Parlements (1648–1649); Princes of the Blood (1650–1653)

Commanders and leaders
(Kingdom of France) Louis XIV; (Kingdom of France) Anne of Austria; (Kingdom of France) Cardinal Mazarin; (Kingdom of France) Condé (1650-1651); (Kingdom of France) Turenne (from 1651)	Gaston of Orleans; Prince of Conti (from 1651); Condé

Casualties and losses
- 50,000+ total deaths

The Fronde (Note: French pronunciation: [fʁɔ̃d]) was a civil war fought in France between 1648 and 1653. The term comes from the French noun for slingshot, and was originally a derogatory term for the rebels.

The conflict derived from opposition to the centralising policies pursued by the government of Anne of Austria and Cardinal Mazarin. These in turn were a response to the financial crisis caused by French involvement in the Thirty Years' War, which ended in 1648, and the ongoing Franco-Spanish War (1635–1659). It can be divided into two parts, the first from 1648 to 1649, generally known as La Fronde des Parlements, followed by La Fronde des Princes from 1650 to 1653. Both resulted in victory for the ruling regime.

== Origins ==
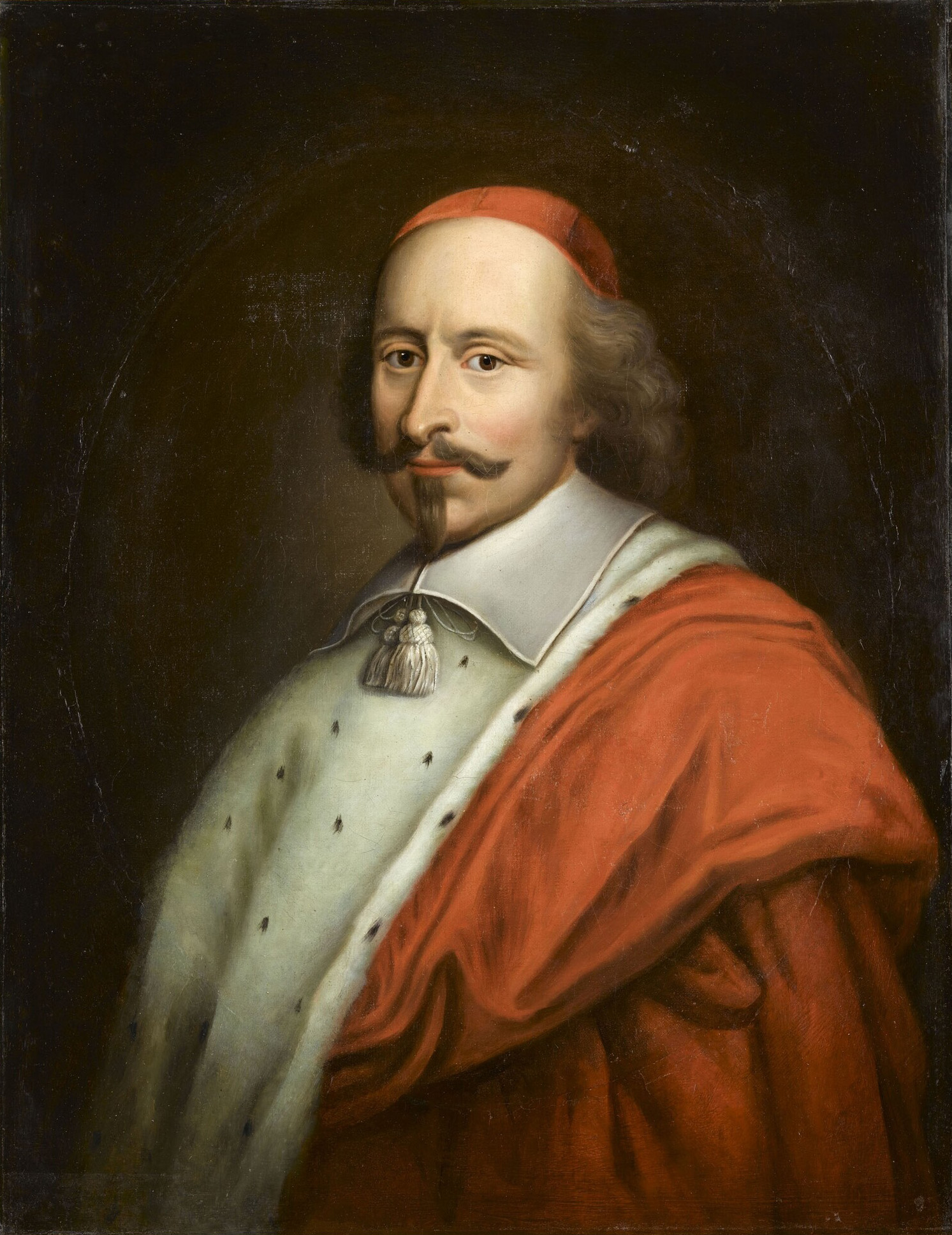
Cardinal Mazarin

The Fronde arose from French involvement in the recently concluded Thirty Years' War, combined with the ongoing Franco-Spanish War (1635–1659). Paying for these wars forced the government under Cardinal Mazarin to raise taxes, the majority of which were paid by the bourgeoisie, whose power base lay in the regional Parlements. The most significant was the Parlement of Paris, which refused to register the new decrees, claiming they represented an assault on established rights.

They were initially supported by members of the regional nobility, who had lost power and influence under Mazarin's predecessor, Cardinal Richelieu, but hoped to regain these privileges. Louis XIV became king in 1643 at the age of five, so France was ruled by a regency dominated by his mother, Anne of Austria, and Mazarin. Historians believe Louis' later insistence on absolute monarchy was to some degree the result of his experience during the Fronde.

The French political class was divided into the Noblesse d'épée, who generally came from the aristocracy, and the Noblesse de robe, whose rank and income derived from judicial or administrative posts. The former relied on their own estates, with some, including Conti and Condé, often wielding more power locally than the central government. The latter were usually hard-working professionals, whose positions were seen as both an investment, and a marker of social exclusivity.

== Fronde des Parlements (1648–1649) ==
In May 1648 a tax levied on judicial officers of the Parlement of Paris provoked not merely a refusal to pay but also a condemnation of earlier financial edicts and a demand for the acceptance of a scheme of constitutional reforms framed by a united committee of the parlement (the Chambre Saint-Louis), composed of members of all the sovereign courts of Paris.

The military record of the Parlementary Fronde is almost blank. In August 1648, feeling strengthened by the news of Prince Louis II de Condé's victory at Lens (20 August 1648), Mazarin suddenly arrested the leaders of the parlement, whereupon Paris broke into insurrection and barricaded the streets.

The noble faction demanded the calling of an assembly of the Estates General, which had last been convoked in 1615. The nobles believed that in the Estates-General, they could continue to control the bourgeois element, as they had in the past.

The royal faction, having no army at its immediate disposal, had to release the prisoners and to promise reforms; on the night of 22 October, it fled from Paris. However France's signing of the Peace of Westphalia (Treaty of Münster, 24 October 1648) allowed the French army to return from the frontiers, and by January 1649, Condé had put Paris under siege. The two warring parties signed the Peace of Rueil (11 March 1649) after little blood had been shed. The Parisians, though still and always anti-cardinalist, had refused to ask for Spanish aid, as proposed by their princely and noble adherents under Armand de Bourbon, prince de Conti, and having no prospect of military success without such aid, the noble party submitted to the government and received concessions.

== Fronde des Princes (1650–1653) ==
From then on the Fronde became a story of intrigues, half-hearted warfare in a scramble for power and control of patronage, losing all trace of its first constitutional phase. The leaders were discontented princes and nobles: Gaston, Duke of Orleans (the king's uncle); the great Louis II, Prince de Condé and his brother Armand, Prince of Conti; Frédéric, Duke of Bouillon, and his brother Henri, Viscount of Turenne. To those must be added Gaston's daughter, Anne, duchess of Montpensier (La grande Mademoiselle); Condé's sister, Madame de Longueville; Madame de Chevreuse; and the astute intriguer Jean François Paul de Gondi, the future Cardinal de Retz. The military operations fell into the hands of war-experienced mercenaries, led by two great, and many lesser, generals.

=== January 1650 – December 1651 ===
"Louis XIV Crushes the Fronde" by Gilles Guérin 1654

The peace of Rueil lasted until the end of 1649. The princes, received at court once more, renewed their intrigues against Mazarin. On 14 January 1650, Cardinal Mazarin, having come to an understanding with Monsieur Gondi and Madame de Chevreuse, suddenly arrested Condé, Conti, and Longueville. This time, it was Turenne, before and afterwards the most loyal soldier of his day, who headed the armed rebellion. Listening to the promptings of Madame de Longueville, he resolved to rescue her brothers, particularly Condé, his old comrade in the battles of Freiburg and Nördlingen.

Turenne hoped to do that with Spanish assistance; a powerful Spanish army assembled in Artois under Archduke Leopold Wilhelm of Austria, governor-general of the Spanish Netherlands, but peasants of the countryside rose against the invaders; the royal army in Champagne was in the capable hands of César de Choiseul, comte du Plessis-Praslin, who counted 52 years of age and 36 of war experience; and the little fortress of Guise successfully resisted the archduke's attack.

At that point Mazarin drew upon Plessis-Praslin's army for reinforcements to be sent to subdue the rebellion in the south forcing the royal general to retire. Then Archduke Leopold Wilhelm decided that he had spent enough of King Philip IV of Spain's money and men in the French quarrel. His regular army withdrew into winter quarters, and left Turenne to deliver the princes with a motley host of Frondeurs and Lorrainers. Plessis-Praslin by force and bribery secured the surrender of Rethel on 13 December 1650 and Turenne, who had advanced to relieve the place, fell back hurriedly. But he was a formidable opponent, and Plessis-Praslin and Mazarin himself, who accompanied the army, had many misgivings as to the result of a lost battle. The marshal chose nevertheless to force Turenne to a decision, and the Battle of Blanc-Champ (near Sommepy-Tahure) or Rethel was the consequence.

Both sides were at a standstill in strong positions, Plessis-Praslin doubtful of the trustworthiness of his cavalry, but Turenne was too weak to attack, when a dispute for precedence arose between the French Guards Regiment and the Picardie regiment. The royal infantry had to be rearranged in order of regimental seniority, and Turenne, seeing and desiring to profit by the attendant disorder, came out of his stronghold and attacked with the greatest vigour. The battle (15 December 1650) was severe and for a time doubtful, but Turenne's Frondeurs gave way in the end, and his army, as an army, ceased to exist. Turenne himself, undeceived as to the part he was playing in the drama, asked and received the young king's pardon, and meantime the court, with the maison du roi and other loyal troops, had subdued the minor risings without difficulty (March–April 1651).

Condé, Conti, and Longueville were released, and by April 1651 the rebellion had everywhere collapsed. Then followed a few months of hollow peace and the court returned to Paris. Mazarin, an object of hatred to all the princes, had already retired into exile. His absence left the field free for mutual jealousies, and for the remainder of the year anarchy reigned in France.

=== December 1651 – February 1653 ===
In December 1651, Cardinal Mazarin returned to France with a small army. The war began again, and this time, Turenne and Condé were pitted against each other.

After that campaign, the civil war ceased, but in the several other campaigns of the Franco-Spanish War that followed, the two great soldiers were opposed to one another, Turenne as the defender of France, Condé as a Spanish invader.

The début of the new Frondeurs took place in Guyenne (February–March 1652), while their Spanish ally, the archduke Leopold Wilhelm, captured various northern fortresses. On the Loire, where the centre of gravity was soon transferred, the Frondeurs were commanded by intriguers and quarrelsome lords, until Condé's arrival from Guyenne. His bold leadership made itself felt in the Bléneau (7 April 1652) in which a portion of the royal army was destroyed, but fresh troops came up to oppose him. From the skillful dispositions made by his opponents, Condé felt the presence of Turenne and broke off the action. The royal army did likewise. Condé invited the commander of Turenne's rearguard to supper, chaffed him unmercifully for allowing the prince's men to surprise him in the morning, and by way of farewell remarked to his guest, "Quel dommage que de braves gens comme nous se coupent la gorge pour un faquin" ("It's too bad decent people like us are cutting our throats for a scoundrel")—an incident and a remark that displayed the feudal arrogance which ironically led to the iron-handed absolutism of Louis XIV.

After Bléneau, both armies marched to Paris to negotiate with the parlement, de Retz and Mlle de Montpensier, while the archduke took more fortresses in Flanders, and Charles, duke of Lorraine, with an army of plundering mercenaries, marched through Champagne to join Condé. As to the latter, Turenne maneuvered past Condé and planted himself in front of the mercenaries, and their leader, not wishing to expend his men against the old French regiments, consented to depart with a money payment and the promise of two tiny Lorraine fortresses.

A few more manœuvers, and the royal army was able to hem in the Frondeurs in the Faubourg St. Antoine (2 July 1652) with their backs to the closed gates of Paris. The royalists attacked all along the line and won a signal victory in spite of the knightly prowess of the prince and his great lords, but at the critical moment Gaston's daughter persuaded the Parisians to open the gates and to admit Condé's army. She herself turned the guns of the Bastille on the pursuers. An insurrectionist government appeared in Paris and proclaimed Monsieur lieutenant-general of the realm. Mazarin, feeling that public opinion was solidly against him, left France again, and the bourgeois of Paris, quarreling with the princes, permitted the king to enter the city on 21 October 1652. Mazarin returned unopposed in February 1653.

== Spanish Fronde ==
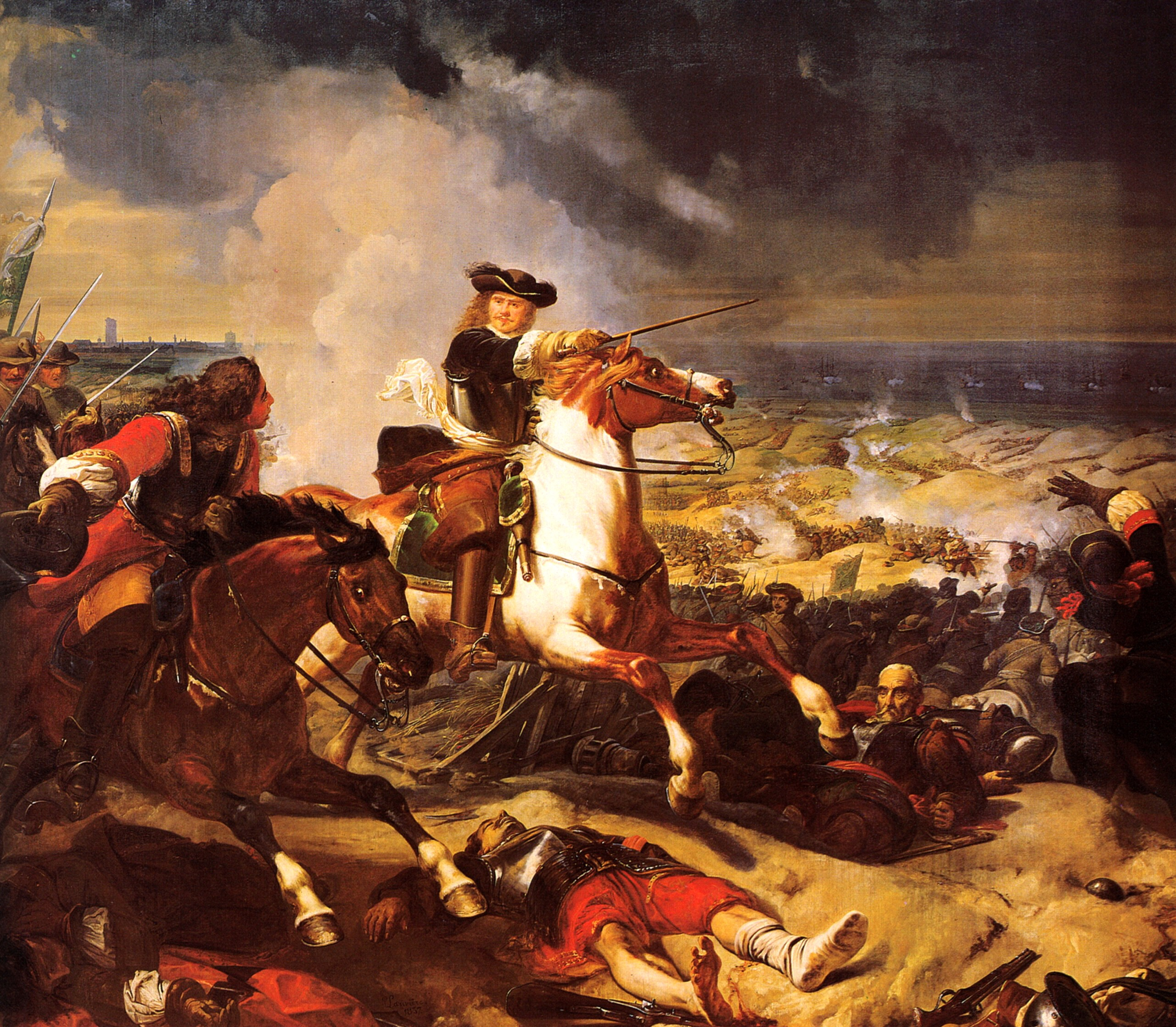
The Battle of the Dunes by Charles-Philippe Larivière, 1837. The battle was a decisive victory for France and its English allies over the Spanish in 1658.

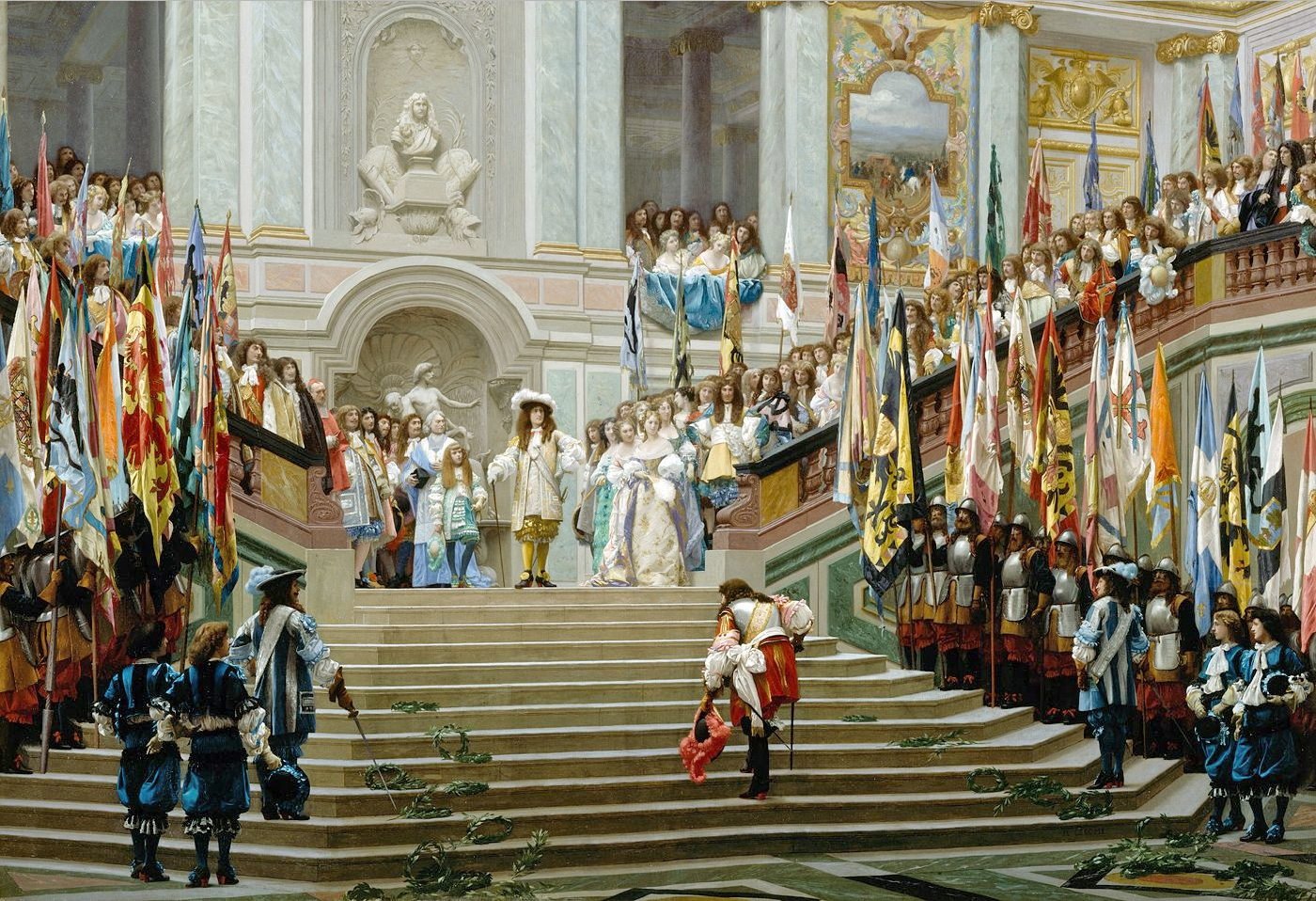
Reception of the Grand Condé at Versailles following his victory at Seneffe. The Grand Condé advances towards Louis XIV in a respectful manner with laurel wreaths on his path, while captured enemy flags are displayed on both sides of the stairs. It marked the end of Condé's exile, following his participation in the Fronde.

The Fronde as a civil war was now over. Tired of the turmoil and disgusted with the princes, the country came to look to the king and his party as representing order. Thus, the Fronde paved the way for the absolutism of Louis XIV. Meanwhile, the Franco-Spanish war continued in Flanders, Catalonia, and Italy wherever a Spanish and a French garrison were face to face. Condé, along with the remnant of his army, defiantly entered the service of the king of Spain.

In 1653, France was so exhausted that neither invaders nor defenders were able to gather supplies to enable them to take the field until July. At one moment, near Péronne, Condé had Turenne at a serious disadvantage but could not galvanize Spanish General Count Fuensaldaña, who was more solicitous to preserve his master's soldiers than to establish Condé as mayor of the palace to the king of France and the armies drew apart again without fighting. In 1654 the principal incident was the siege and relief of Arras. On the night of 24/25 August the lines of circumvallation drawn round that place by the prince were brilliantly stormed by Turenne's army and Condé won equal credit for his safe withdrawal of the besieging corps under cover of a series of bold cavalry charges led by himself as usual, sword in hand.

In 1655, Turenne captured the fortresses of Landrecies, Condé and St Ghislain. In 1656 the prince of Condé avenged the defeat of Arras by storming Turenne's circumvallation around Valenciennes (16 July) but Turenne drew off his forces in good order. The campaign of 1657 was uneventful and is only to be remembered because a body of 6,000 English infantry, sent by Oliver Cromwell in pursuance of his treaty of alliance with Mazarin, took part in it. The presence of the English contingent and its purpose of making Dunkirk a new Calais, to be held by England forever, gave the next campaign a character of certainty and decision which was entirely wanting in the rest of the war.

Dunkirk was besieged promptly in great force and when Don Juan of Austria and Condé appeared with the relieving army from Fumes, Turenne advanced boldly to meet them. The Battle of the Dunes, fought on 14 June 1658, was the first real trial of strength since the battle of the Faubourg St Antoine. Successes on one wing were compromised by failure on the other but in the end Condé drew off with many losses, the success of his cavalry charges subverted by the defeat of the Spanish right wing among the dunes.

Here the "red-coats" made their first appearance on a continental battlefield, under the leadership of Sir William Lockhart, Cromwell's ambassador at Paris. They astonished both armies by the stubborn fierceness of their assaults. Dunkirk fell and was handed over to the English Protectorate, as promised, flying the St George's Cross until Charles II sold it to Louis XIV in 1662.

One last half-hearted campaign followed in 1659—the twenty-fifth year of a conflict between France and Spain which had begun during the Thirty Years' War—then the peace of the Pyrenees was signed on 5 November. On 27 January 1660 the prince asked and obtained at Aix-en-Provence the forgiveness of Louis XIV. The later careers of Turenne and Condé were as obedient subjects of their sovereign.

== Sources ==
- Bonney, Richard J. "The French Civil War, 1649–53." European History Quarterly (1978) 8#1 pp: 71–100.
- Bonney, Richard J. Society and Government in France under Richelieu and Mazarin, 1624–1661 1988. With 309 original documents table of contents
- Clodfelter, Micheal (2008). Warfare and Armed Conflicts: A Statistical Encyclopedia of Casualty and Other Figures, 1492–2015 (2017 ed.). McFarland. ISBN 978-0-7864-7470-7.
- Gasper, Julia (2013). The Marquis d'Argens: A Philosophical Life. Lexington. ISBN 978-0739182338.
- Gelbart, Nina R (1984). ""Frondeur" Journalism in the 1770s: Theater Criticism and Radical Politics in the Prerevolutionary French Press". Eighteenth Century Studies: 493–514. JSTOR 2738132.
- Kettering, Sharon (1986). "Patronage and Politics during the Fronde". French Historical Studies. 14 (3): 409–441. JSTOR 286384.
- Knecht, Robert Jean. The French civil wars, 1562–1598 (Longman, 2000)
- Moote, A. Lloyd (1972). The revolt of the judges: the Parlement of Paris and the Fronde, 1643–1652. Princeton University Press. ISBN 978-0691620107.
- Ranum, Orest A. The Fronde: A French Revolution, 1648–1652 (WW Norton, 1993)
- Moote, A. Lloyd (1972). The revolt of the judges: the Parlement of Paris and the Fronde, 1643–1652. Princeton University Press. ISBN 978-0691620107.
- Treasure, Geoffrey. "The Fronde, Part II: The Battle for France", History Today (1978) 28#7 pp 436–445, popular summary; online
- Amigo Vázquez, Lourdes (2019). "Un nuevo escenario de la guerra con Francia. La intervención española en la Fronda (1648–1653)". Studia historica. Historia moderna (in Spanish). 41 (1). España: 153–188. doi:10.14201/shhmo2019411153188. hdl:10366/142076. S2CID 198725766.
- Wolf, John (1958). "The Formation of a King". French Historical Studies. 1 (1): 40–72. JSTOR 285916.
