= Royalist Army in Exile =

Historic military force loyal to Charles II

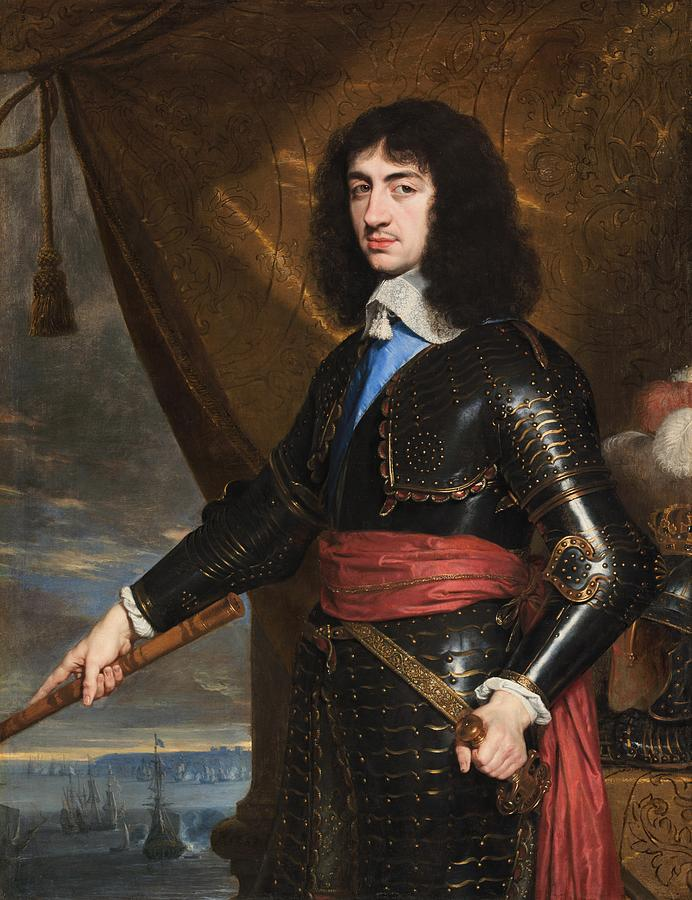
Charles II was in Continental exile following his escape from England in 1651. In 1656 his new alliance with Spain raised hopes of a military restoration to his British and Irish thrones.

The Royalist Army in Exile was the army formed by those loyal to Charles II from 1656 to 1660 during his exile from the throne. They were a mixture of Royalist troops from his three Kingdoms. It included men from England and Scotland, but the bulk were Catholics from Ireland, many of whom had previously served in the Irish Confederate armies.

== Background ==
Charles had been living in exile in France since his escape following the defeat at Worcester. However the Treaty of Paris between France and Oliver Cromwell's English Commonwealth forced him to leave the French capital. He signed the Treaty of Brussels with Spain, committing to raise forces for their war with France. Exiled Royalists had been living on the continent since the defeat of their cause, while many former Irish Confederates had taken up service as mercenaries following the Cromwellian conquest of Ireland. Whole Irish regiments were serving in the French Army as was Charles' younger brother James, Duke of York.

== Composition ==
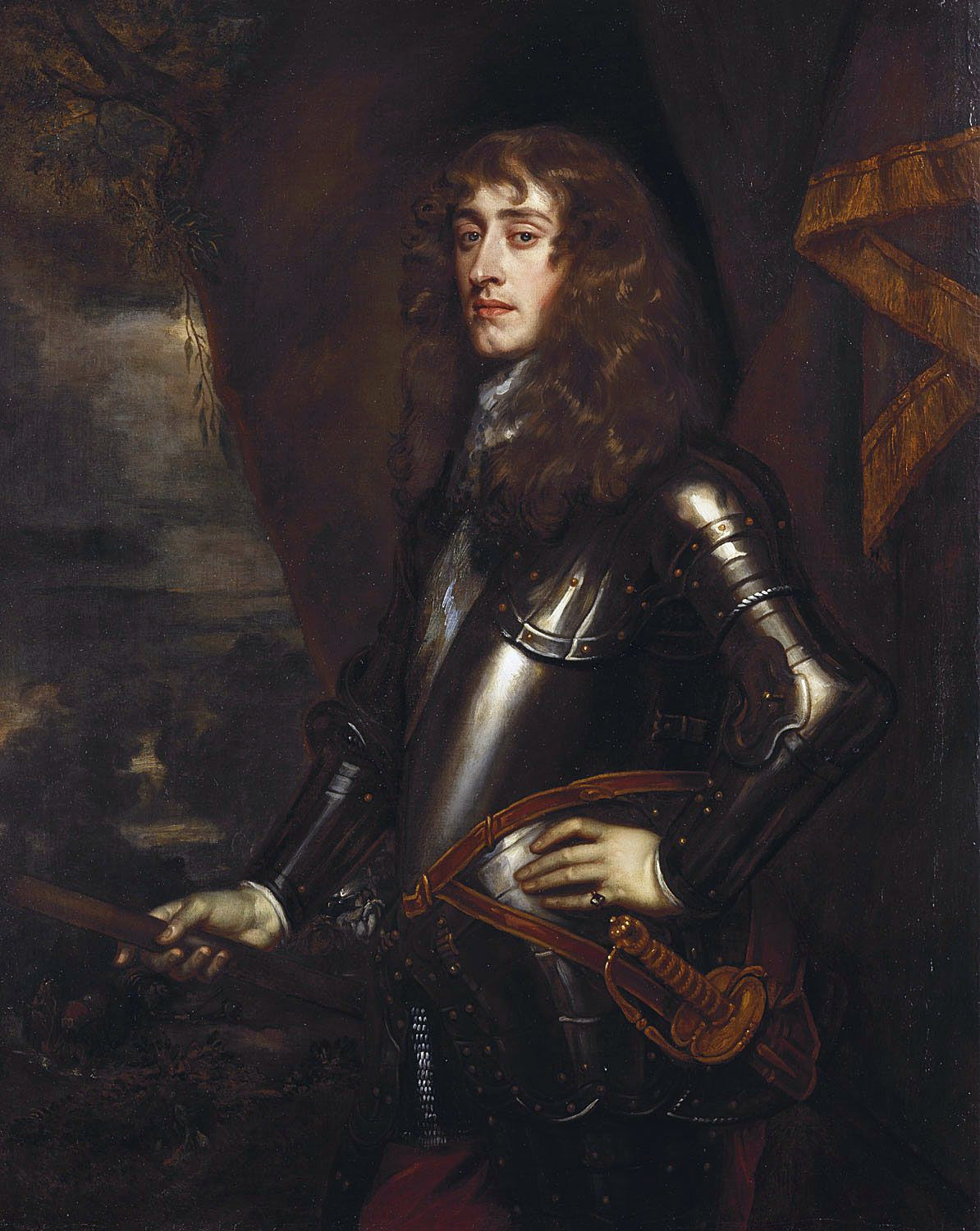
Charles II's younger brother James, Duke of York commanded the Royalist Army in the field, notably at the Battle of the Dunes.

Charles had committed to his Spanish allies to recruit those Irish soldiers serving in the French armies. Some troops began deserting in small numbers to serve the Royalist cause, Charles' principal advisors Edward Hyde and the former Irish Viceroy Lord Ormonde opened negotiations with the various colonels of the regiments, many of whom had fought for Charles following his alliance with the Irish Confederates during the Cromwellian conquest of Ireland. Ultimately despite French resistance to the move, which Charles justified by his need to secure his restoration, and the status of the French-born queen mother Henrietta Maria, the Irish colonels all transferred into the king's service. Their troops, if denied permission, deserted in droves and made their way to the Spanish Netherlands. However some Irish soldiers chose to stay in French service despite their alliance with Cromwell, which led to the Royalists recruiting fresh troops direct from Ireland. James, Duke York was reluctant to abandon his position in the French court and military which he felt would serve the Royalist cause far better, until he received a direct order from his brother.

English cavaliers filtered in and formed an infantry regiment under Lord Rochester which formed the basis of the later Grenadier Guards. A separate Scottish infantry regiment was raised under the command of Lord Middleton, formed of a mixture of veterans from the 1648 campaign and Glencairn's Rising. The Irish troops were formed into regiments under the notional command of several exiled princes and grandees, but under the effective command of their previous colonels. Ormonde's Regiment was led by Richard Grace, the Duke of York's Regiment was commanded by Lord Muskerry, the Duke of Gloucester's by Lord Taaffe. A fourth Irish regiment was formed under Lisagh Farrell who led his regiment across from a French garrison near Brussels. He exercised control but it was under the formal command of Lord Bristol who had arranged their defection to the King's service. In addition to the six infantry regiments, a small Lifeguard of horseman was raised to serve with the King's brother, the Duke of York. A regiment of cavalry was planned to be raised under Lord Gerard but this was never accomplished. In a more junior role, the future Jacobite Lord Lieutenant of Ireland Richard Talbot served with the Duke of York.

== Campaign ==
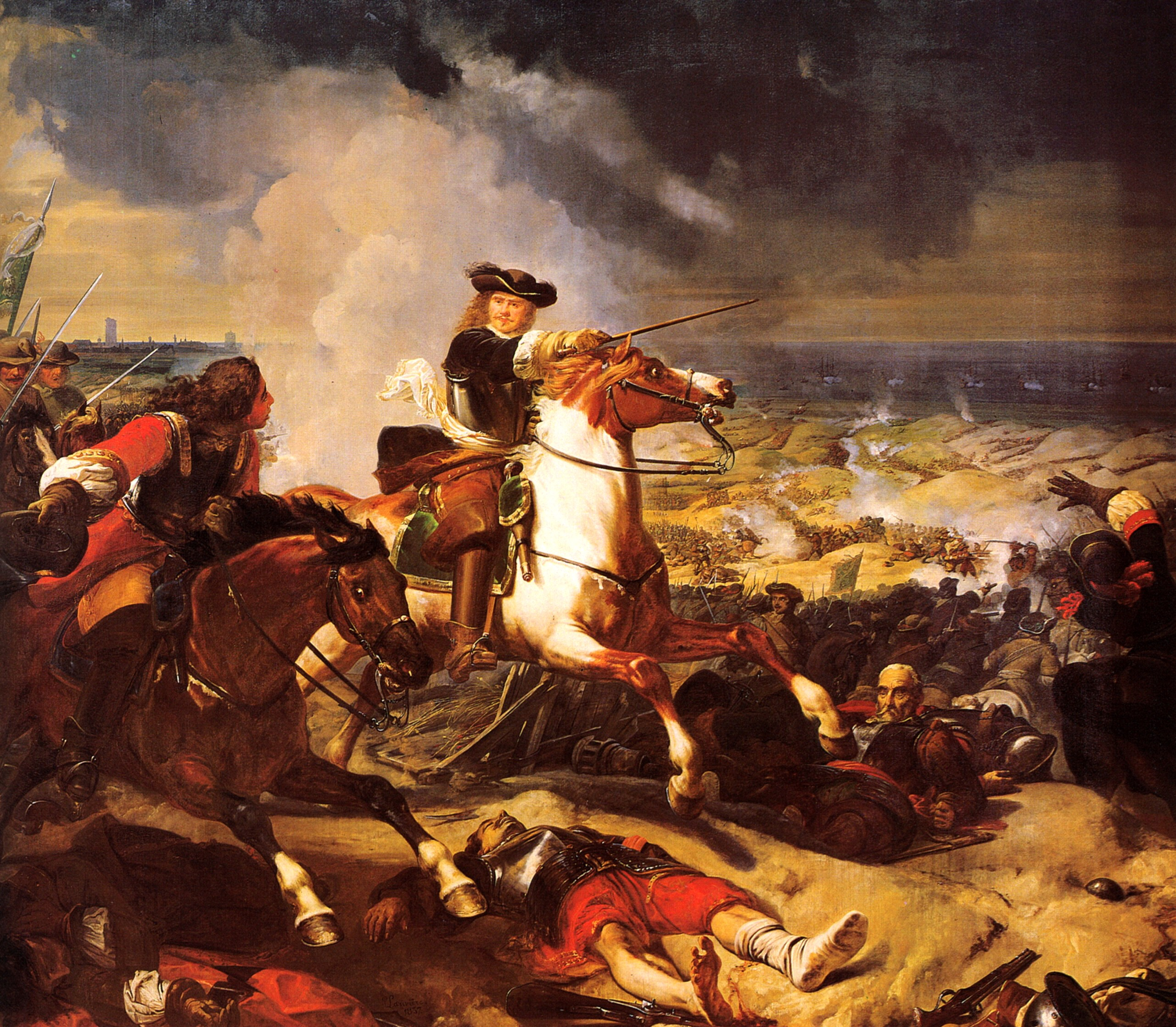
The Battle of the Dunes by Charles-Philippe Larivière, 1837. The Royalist cause suffered a major setback when the exiled army and their Spanish allies were heavily defeated at the Battle of the Dunes by a combined French-English force featuring New Model Army troops.

In return for supplies and ammunition from their Spanish allies, the Royalist Army pledged to attempt to seize a port in England and launch a rising against the regime of Oliver Cromwell. The activities of the exile army were closely monitored by agents of Cromwell's spymaster John Thurloe.

In 1658 an allied force of Cromwell's English soldiers and French troops under Turenne advanced to lay siege to Dunkirk. The Spanish and their English Royalist allies confronted them at the Battle of the Dunes and were decisively defeated, with Dunkirk falling soon after. The army continued to serve with the Spanish field armies until the Treaty of the Pyrenees brought an end to the conflict in November 1659. By that time internal developments in Britain following the death of Oliver Cromwell laid the path towards the Restoration the following year.

== Aftermath ==
Following the Restoration the new political settlement in England called for a dramatically reduced standing army following the disbanding of the large New Model Army. The reimposed penal laws forbade Catholics from serving in the reformed English Army or its Irish equivalent. Many of the troops of the exiled Royalist Army remained at Dunkirk until it was sold to the French in 1662, serving alongside their former opponents from the Battle of the Dunes. They were then dispersed, either to serve in the Tangier Garrison in Morocco or the English expedition to Portugal.

== Bibliography ==
- Barratt, John. Better Begging Than Fighting': The Royalist Army in Exile in the War Against Cromwell 1656-1660. Helion, 2016.
- Childs, John. The Army of Charles II. Routledge, 1976.
- Smith, Geoffrey. Royalist Agents, Conspirators and Spies: Their Role in the British Civil Wars, 1640–1660. Routledge, 2016.
