= Sale of Dunkirk =

1662 transfer from England to France

The Sale of Dunkirk took place on 27 October [O.S. 17 October] 1662 when Charles II of England sold his sovereign rights to Dunkirk and Fort-Mardyck to his cousin Louis XIV of France.

== Context ==
Dunkirk was occupied by English forces of the Protectorate in 1658, when it was captured from Spain by Anglo-French forces following the Battle of the Dunes. The Spanish forces included the Royalist Army in Exile consisting of English, Scottish, and Irish Royalist Regiments: the English King's Guards (foot) under Wentworth; a Scottish regiment under Newburgh; The Marquis of Ormond's (Irish) Regiment under Richard Grace; The Duke of York's (Irish) Regiment under Muskerry; The Duke of Gloucester's (Irish) Regiment under Taaffe; and Farrell's (Irish) Regiment under Lisagh Farrell. The regiments (except perhaps Ormond's) were seriously understrength and were all under the overall command of James, Duke of York. There was also a small contingent of James' own Life Guards. The English part of the Anglo-French force included regiments under William Lockhart, Thomas Morgan, Roger Alsop, Samuel Clark, Bryce Cochrane and Roger Lillingston.

France, effectively ruled by Mazarin, had promised, as part of the Treaty of Paris (1657) that Dunkirk and Mardyck, which were in the Spanish Netherlands, would be ceded to England. Mazarin honoured that pledge after the victory at The Dunes, and Louis XIV himself delivered Dunkirk over to Lockhart, who was Cromwell's Ambassador to France, on or about 24 June 1658. Cromwell appointed Lockhart Governor of the town.

Lockhart's regiment, much reduced in the battle, and Alsop's garrisoned Dunkirk and Mardyke (now Fort-Mardyck), taken in 1657, reinforced by Salmon's and Gibbon's regiments from England, but Morgan's, Clark's, Cochrane's and Lillingston's continued to serve with the French Army in Flanders. The Royalist regiments, even more reduced by the defeat, continued to serve with Spain. In early 1659, most of Salmon's regiment was sent back to England, as was Gibbon's, and three regiments of the Protectorate force (Morgan's, Clark's and Cochrane's) returned to England in August 1659 in response to planned but discovered Royalist uprisings culminating in Booth's uprising.

The Treaty of the Pyrenees in November 1659 confirmed English possession of Dunkirk, which then passed to Charles II following the Restoration in 1660. Dunkirk was garrisoned by an uneasy mixture of English former New Model Army troops of republican sympathies and several Royalist regiments who had served under Charles in exile, which included many Irish Catholics. Many of the garrison of Dunkirk were shipped to English Tangier, which had recently been acquired as part of the Marriage Treaty with Portugal, where it formed most of the initial Tangier Garrison. Also, many from the garrison joined the British brigade to fight in Portugal to help with its war of restoration against Spain.

== Sale ==
In 1662, Charles II, short of money and concerned that Dunkirk was a potential liability for international relations, sold it to France. The purchase price was five million livres. The banker Edward Backwell, who served as Treasurer of Dunkirk under both the Republican and Royal governments, was instrumental in the sale. Many in England were opposed to the loss.

== Sources ==
- Childs, John (1976). The Army of Charles II. Routledge.
- Riley, Jonathon (2014). The Last Ironsides: The English Expedition to Portugal, 1662–1668. Helion & Company. ISBN 978-1909982208.
- Uglow, Jenny (2009). A Gambling Man: Charles II and the Restoration. Faber and Faber.
