= Richard Grace =

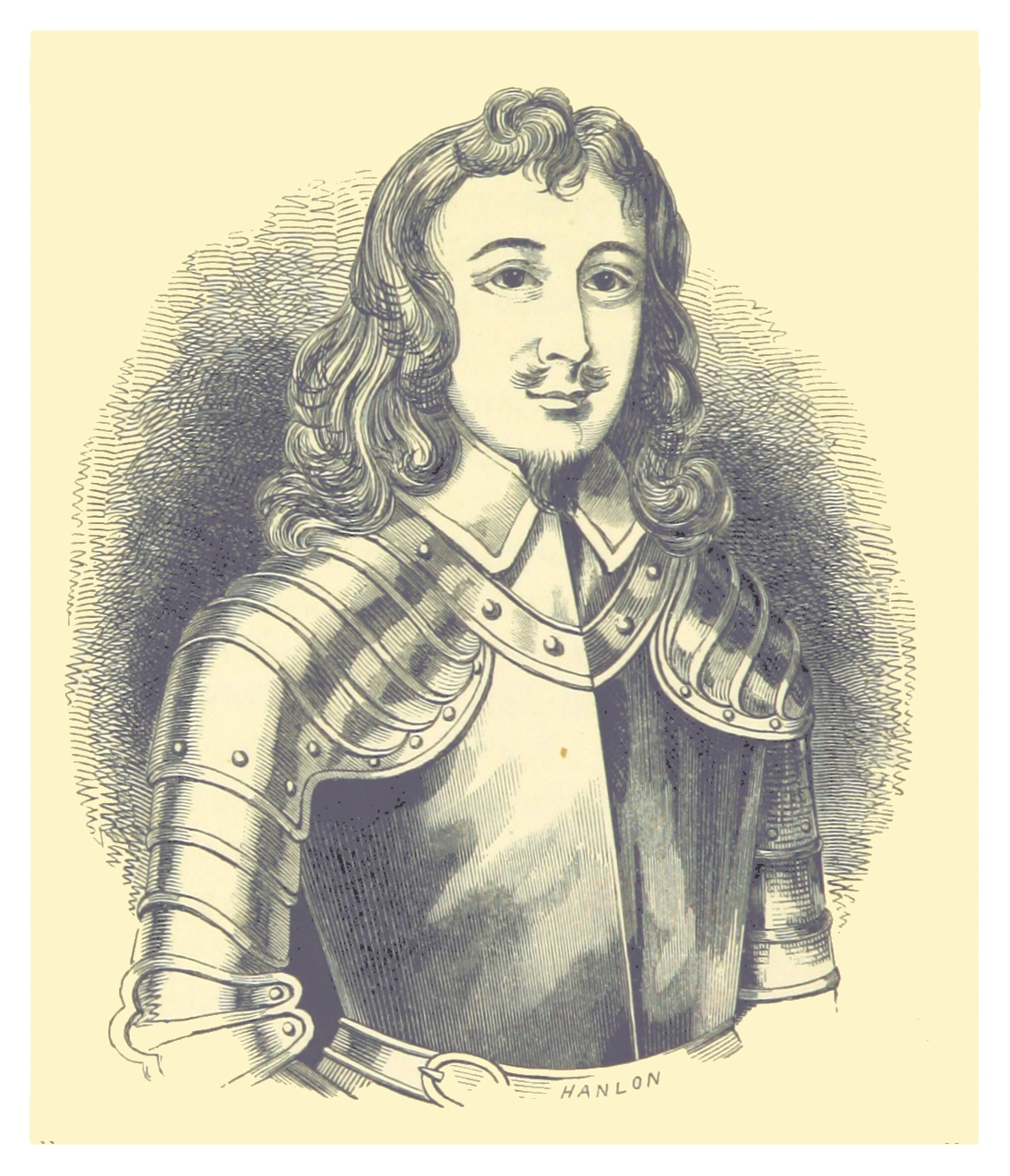
- Richard Grace, copy of 1652 engraving
- Born: ca. 1612; Ireland
- Died: 1691 (aged about 79); Athlone, Ireland)
- Military career
- Allegiance: England (to 1642); Cavaliers (1642–53); Spain (1653– ? ) France (? –1660); England (1660–88); Jacobites (1688–91)
- Rank: Colonel
- Conflicts: Battle of the Dunes (1658), Siege of Athlone

Colonel Richard Grace (c. 1612–1691) was an Irish Royalist soldier who fought for Charles I, Charles II and James II. He served in the Royalist Army in Exile during the 1650s.

== Biography ==
Grace, the younger son of Robert Grace, feudal baron of Courtstown, was born in the early part of the 17th century, of a Kilkenny family that may have been descended from Odo, Count of Champagne. He resided at Moyelly Castle, Queen's County, and served Charles I in England, until the surrender of Oxford in 1646. He then returned to Ireland, and was for some years engaged in the Irish Confederate Wars. He is referred to in State Papers as being at the head of 3,000 men, harassing the Parliamentary troops — now in Wicklow, and again at Crogan, beyond the River Shannon.

In 1652 a reward of £300 was by the English Commonwealth government set upon his head, yet at the conclusion of the war he was permitted to enter the Spanish service with 1,200 of his men. At the Battle of the Dunes (1658) he commanded the Lord Ormond's regiment of Irish in the services of King Charles II. After some time he went over to the French side, without betraying any trust imposed upon him, having given due notice to his Spanish friends. After the Restoration he was appointed Chamberlain to the Duke of York (the future James II), and in consideration of his faithful and indefatigable services, received "pensions of £400, and a portion at least of his estates were restored to him."

When James II came to Ireland following the Glorious Revolution, Grace was appointed Governor of Athlone, with a garrison of three regiments of foot, and eleven troops of cavalry. After the Battle of the Boyne, Athlone was invested by General Douglas with ten regiments of foot, and five of horse. Grace having burnt the English town, and broken down the bridge, defended the Connaught works with indomitable spirit. When called upon to surrender, he fired a pistol over the messenger's head, and declared: "These are my terms; these only will I give or receive; and when my provisions are consumed, I will defend till I eat my old boots." At the end of a week, Douglas was obliged to draw off, with the loss of 400 men. The town was again invested by Godert de Ginkell in 1691.

Marquis de St Ruth had meanwhile obliged Grace to exchange three of his veteran regiments for inferior French troops. Nevertheless, he made a heroic defence under St Ruth, and on 30 June 1691, after de Ginkell's passage of the Shannon and the capture of the citadel on the Connaught side, Colonel Grace's body was found under the ruins. His conduct towards the Protestants within his district is described as having been peculiarly humane and just; and although the severity of his discipline contrasted with the irregularities tolerated in other portions of the Irish army, he was greatly beloved by his men. As for the Grace family, they still exist to this day however they no longer hold a peerage or any type of social influence.

== See also ==
- Robert Grace
