= Mardyck =

- Associated commune of Dunkerque
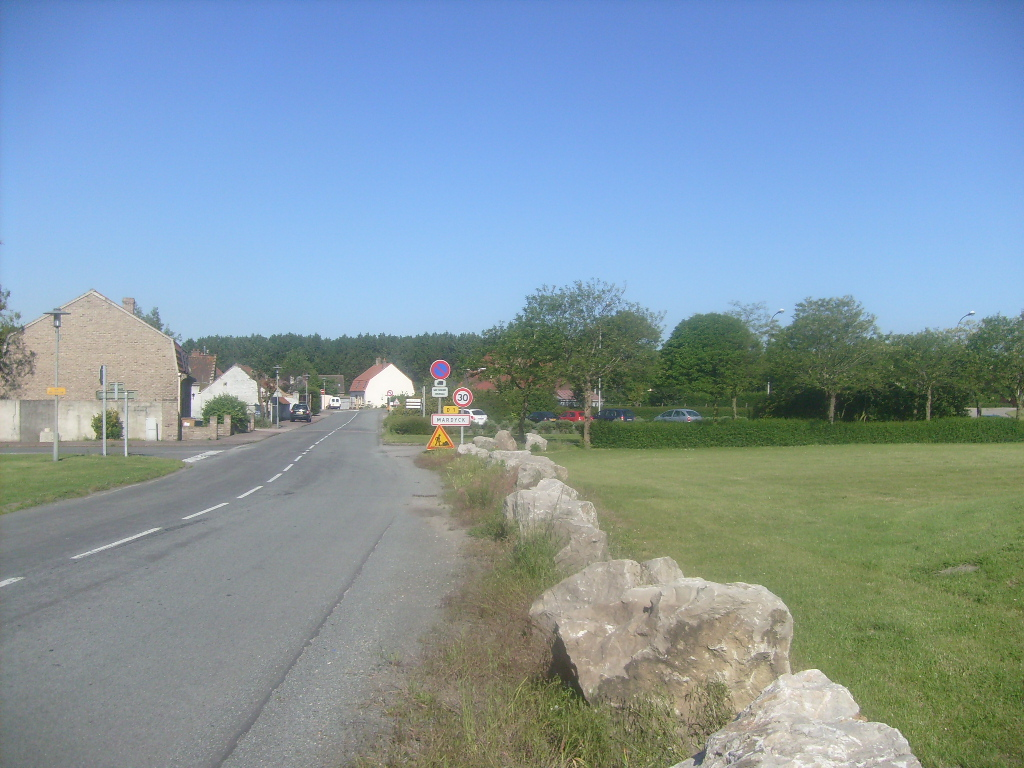
- Entering Mardyck from Dunkerque

- Flag Coat of arms
- Location of Mardyck
- Location within France Location within Hauts-de-France
- Coordinates: 51°01′10″N 2°15′02″E
- Country: France
- Region: Hauts-de-France
- Department: Nord
- Arrondissement: Dunkerque
- Canton: Grande-Synthe
- Commune: Dunkerque
- Area^{1}: 8.69 km^{2} (3.36 sq mi)
- Population (2022): 237
  - Density: 27.3/km^{2} (70.6/sq mi)
- Time zone: UTC+01:00 (CET)
  - Summer (DST): UTC+02:00 (CEST)
- Postal code: 59279
- ^{1} French Land Register data, which excludes lakes, ponds, glaciers > 1 km^{2} (0.386 sq mi or 247 acres) and river estuaries.

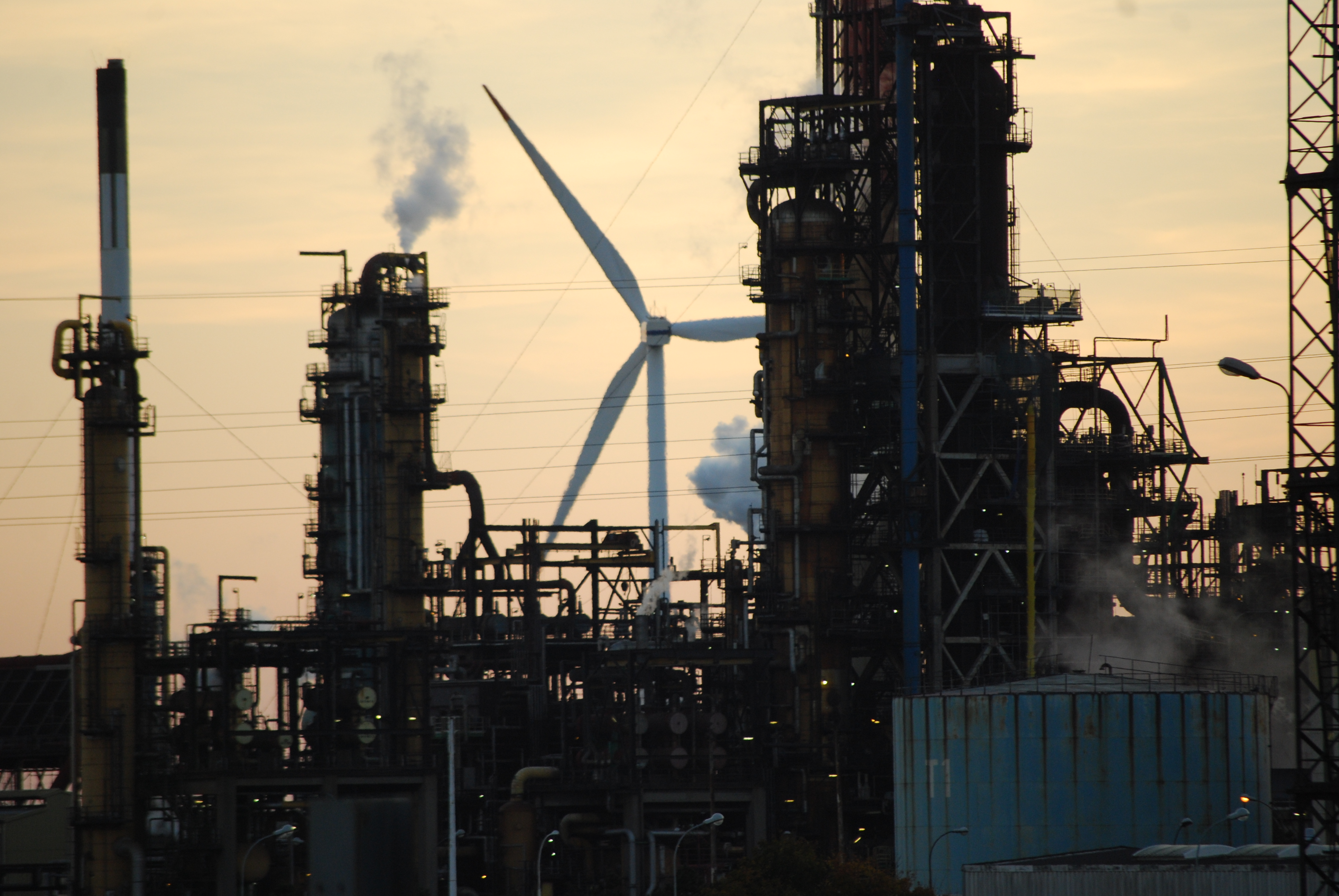
Oil refinery on the Nouveau Canal de Mardyck

Mardyck (Dutch: Mardijk, West Flemish: Mardyk) is a former commune in the Nord department in northern France. It is an associated commune with Dunkirk since it joined the latter in January 1980.

== Heraldry ==
The arms of Mardyck are blazoned: Azure, standing in a boat Or, St. Nicolas vested argent and Or, with mitre and crozier Or, with 3 children at his feet.

== See also ==
- Communes of the Nord department
- Fort-Mardyck
