= Battle of the Dunes (1658) =

1658 battle of the Franco-Spanish War

- Part of the Franco-Spanish War and Anglo-Spanish War (1654–1660)
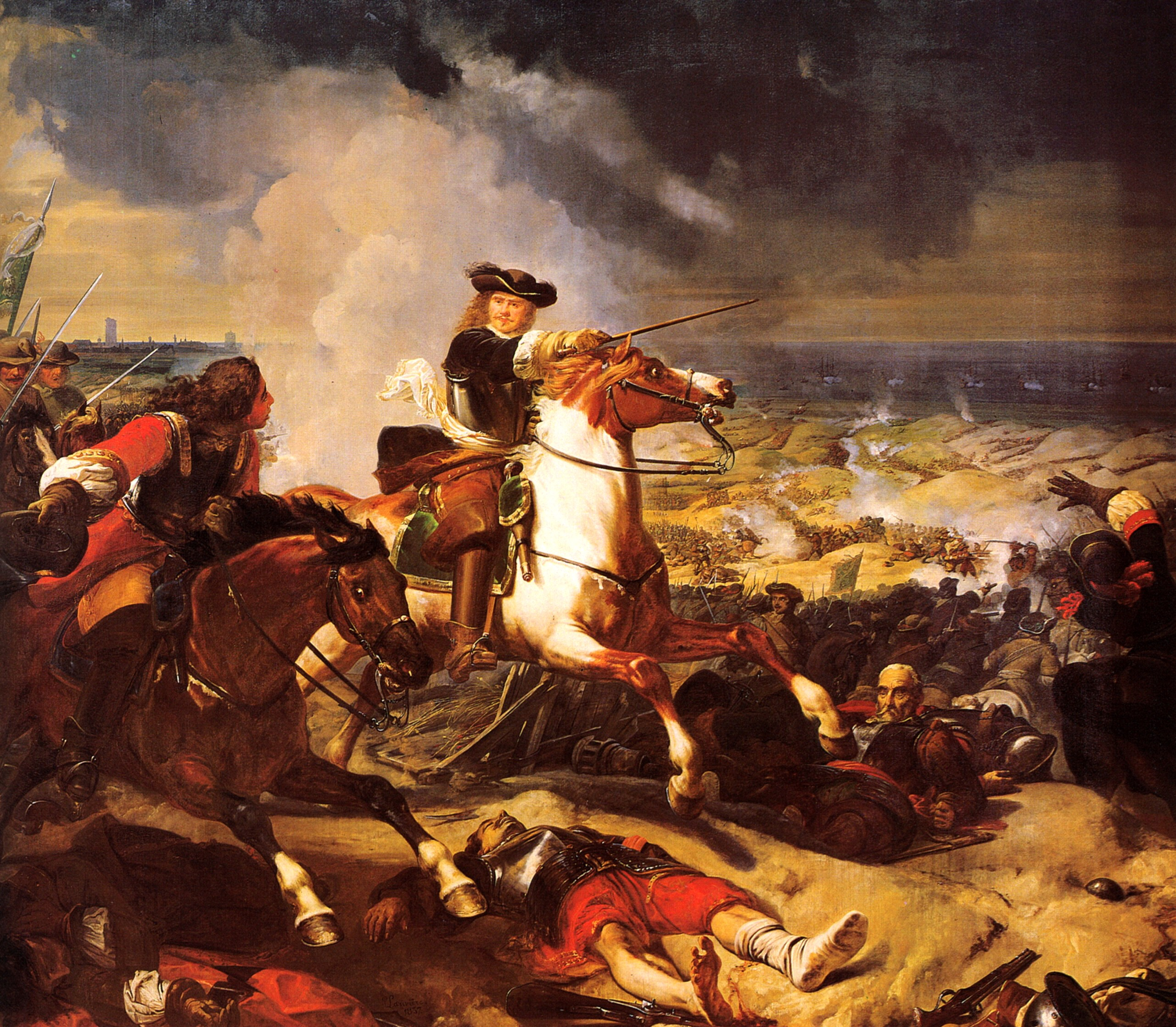
- The Battle of the Dunes (1837)
Date	14 June 1658
Location	Near Dunkirk, Spanish Netherlands 51.0383°N 2.3775°E
Result	Franco-Commonwealth victory

Belligerents
France; England	Spain; Exiled Royalists

Commanders and leaders
Turenne; François de Créquy; William Lockhart	John of Austria; Luis Carrillo (Spanish Empire) Grand Condé (Spanish Empire) James, Duke of York

Strength
14,000–15,000 (Note: Sources vary considerably on the army strengths of cavalry and infantry of both sides with a general agreement that both were about 15,000 strong. For example the French-Commonwealth strength is given as: 6,000 horse, 9,000 foot (Fortescue 1899, p. 271); 9,000 horse, 6,000-foot (Davis 2001, p. 221); 9,000 horse, 6,000-foot (Hamilton 1874, p. 24); 6,000 horse, 8,000-foot (Longueville 1907, p. 261); 5,000 to 6,000 horse in 58 squadrons, 9,000-foot in 18 battalions (Ramsay 1735, p. 184); 6,000 horse, 9,000-foot (Hozier 1885, p. 132); 4,000 horse, 6,000-foot (Manganiello 2004, p. 170); 5,000 to 6,000 horse in 58 squadrons, 9,000-foot in 16 battalions (Cust 1867, p. 85); 6,000 horse, 8,000-foot (Waylen 1880, p. 204).) (3,000 British troops)	14,000–15,000 (Note: Spanish et al strength: 8,000 horse, 6,000 foot (Longueville 1907, p. 261); 5,000 horse, 10,000-foot (Davis 2001, p. 221); 8,000 horse (4,000 of which are described as out foraging), 6,000-foot in 15 battalions (Ramsay 1735, pp. 499–500); 8,000 horse, 6,000-foot (Hozier 1885, p. 131); 3,000 horse, 12,000-foot (Manganiello 2004, p. 171); 9,000 to 10,000 horse, 5,000-foot (Cust 1867, p. 85); Condé 4,000 horse on the left wing and calls the armies even in numbers (Waylen 1880, p. 205).) (2,000 British troops)

Casualties and losses
400 killed or wounded	6,000 (Note: Tucker states 1,000 killed and 5,000 captured.)–8,000 (Note: Clodfelter states 1,000 killed, 3,000 wounded and 4,000 captured (including many of the wounded).)

The Battle of the Dunes (French: Bataille des Dunes, Spanish: Batalla de las Dunas), also known as the Battle of Dunkirk, took place on 14 June 1658, near the strategic port of Dunkirk in what was then the Spanish Netherlands. Part of the Franco-Spanish War and concurrent Anglo-Spanish War, a French army under Turenne, supported by troops from the Commonwealth of England, had besieged Dunkirk. Led by John Joseph of Austria and Louis, Grand Condé, a Spanish force supported by the Royalist Army in Exile and French Fronde rebels attempted to raise the siege but suffered a severe defeat.

Despite this victory, both the French and Spanish were financially exhausted by the long running war and negotiated the Treaty of the Pyrenees in November 1659. England retained possession of Dunkirk until 1662 when the port was sold to France by Charles II.

== Background ==
A complex political situation resulted in both French and English forces fighting for both sides. When the government of Louis XIV formed an alliance with Lord Protector Oliver Cromwell, the exiled Charles II of England allied himself with Philip IV of Spain. Charles set up his headquarters in Bruges and established the Royalist Army in Exile. The Spanish supplied only enough money to form five regiments. This was a disappointment for the Royalists, who had hoped to be able to form an army large enough to contemplate an invasion of the English Commonwealth. A renewal of a 1657 treaty between Cromwell and Louis XIV provided 6,000 Commonwealth infantry and a fleet to aid Turenne. Along with English forces, French forces fought on both sides with Condé, a French Prince of the blood, leading a contingent of French rebels of the Fronde.

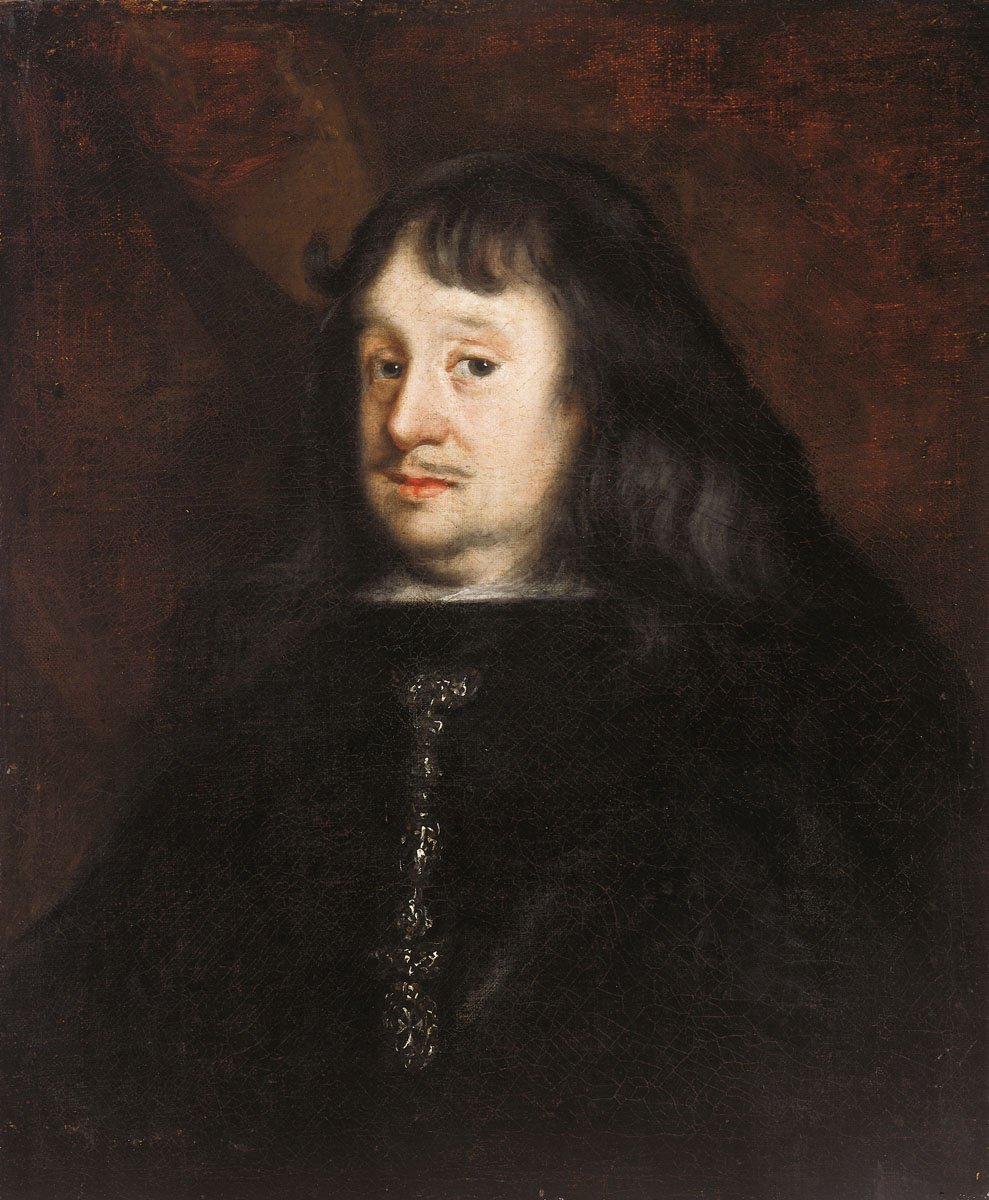
Don Juan José de Austria, Spanish commander at Battle of the Dunes

The 15,000 French supported by 6,000 troops from the English Commonwealth besieged Dunkirk. Dunkirk was Spain's greatest base for privateers, and these privateers had wreaked havoc on English merchant shipping. (Note: England had lost 1,500 to 2,000 ships to Spain that year (Rodger 2004, p. 28).) It was defended by a garrison of about 3,000 in May 1658, while an English fleet of 18 ships, under Edward Mountagu, blockaded the port and prevented any reinforcement or supply by sea. The Spanish and their allies were caught by surprise as they were convinced that Turenne would attack Cambrai, while they thought Dunkirk was merely a diversion, and they responded belatedly and hastily. The approach to Dunkirk was made difficult as the inhabitants had opened the sluices and flooded the area, but Turenne persisted and opened the trenches on the night of 4/5 June.

A Spanish army under the command of John Joseph of Austria, consisting of about 15,000 men, moved to raise the siege. It was divided in two corps, the Spanish Army of Flanders on the right and centre and the small corps of French rebels, of the Fronde, on the left under the command of Condé. The Spanish army included Spanish, German and Walloon troops, and a force of 2,000 English and Irish Royalists – formed as the nucleus of potential army for the invasion of England by Charles II, with Charles' brother James, Duke of York, amongst its commanders – was sent to relieve the town.

Leaving some 6,000 men to continue the siege, Turenne advanced to meet the Spanish army. The battle on 14 June 1658 which resulted from this manoeuvre became known as the Battle of the Dunes because the Spanish army formed their line upon a line of dunes, or sand-hills, also called the Downs, perpendicular to the sea. Napoleon described the battle as Turenne's "... most brilliant action". The red-coats of the New Model Army under the leadership of Sir William Lockhart, Cromwell's ambassador at Paris in Turenne's army, astonished both armies by the stubborn fierceness of their assault up a sand-hill 150 feet (46 m) high and strongly defended by Spanish veterans. (Note: The English had learnt a lot about war since two rabbles had met at the Battle of Edgehill in 1642 (Niderost 1993 and Atkinson 1911, p. 404))

== Battle ==
The Spanish army approached and camped upon a line of dunes north-east of Dunkirk. Turenne seized the initiative and marched out to meet the Spanish and attack them the following day. The French army of some 6,000 foot and 8,000 horse and 10 cannon were deployed with their left on the sea and their right on the canal. Turenne, before low tide, deployed his French-English force in two lines with cavalry on each flank. With the left flank cavalry on the beach, 40 squadrons strong, Turenne planned to take advantage of the turning tide going out to expose the Spanish right to his cavalry. Turenne placed 5 cannon on the right wing between the downs and the meadow and 5 cannon on the left along the strand. Cromwell's English, under the command of Major General Thomas Morgan and William Lockhart, were lined up against the Spanish troops while the centre was the French infantry consisting of the Guards, the Swiss and the regiments of Picardy and Turenne facing the Wallons and Germans. The right flank French cavalry under the Duke de Crequi opposed Condé.

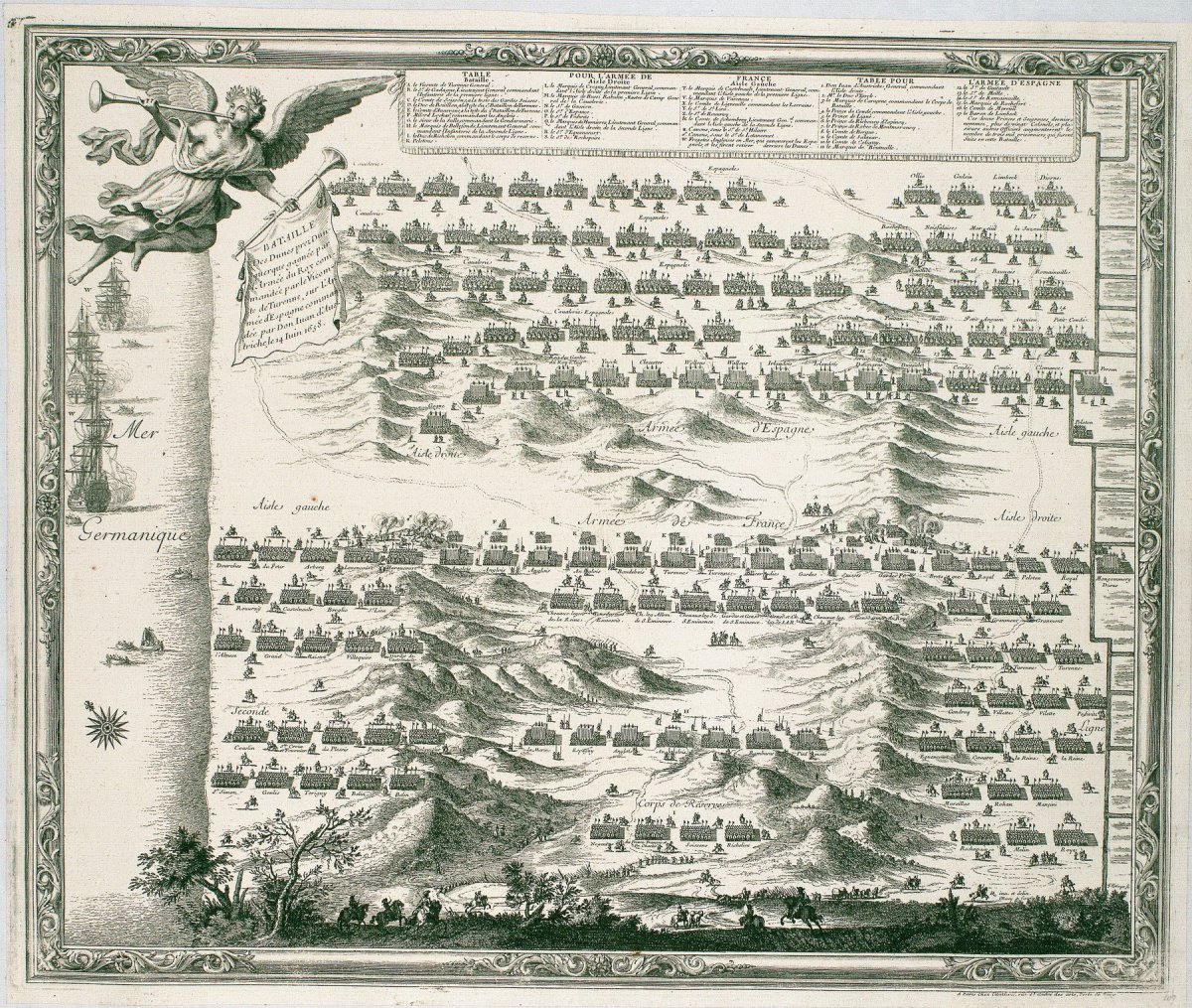
Battle of the Dunes 1658 - 1698 engraving by Sebastian Beaulieu, showing the Spanish deployment at top and French below.

The Spanish army with 6,000 foot and 9,000 horse formed up with its right on the sea across the sand-hills to the canal of Furnes on their left. The regular Spanish infantry tercios were on the right under the command of Don Juan, the Royalist regiments under the Duke of York were on their left to the right centre, the Walloon and German tercios were in the centre and on the left were the French rebel Frondeurs and some other troops. The Spanish cavalry was drawn up in line behind the infantry. In their rush to relieve Dunkirk the Spanish had left their artillery behind.

Turenne began the battle with four or five artillery salvoes from his two unopposed batteries, and the Spanish right flank was bombarded with some harassing fire from several frigates and sloops of the English fleet. The Anglo-French army began to advance, and the Cromwellian English pressed quickly ahead against the Spanish tercio of Don Caspar Boniface deployed on a sand dune that was somewhat in advance of the rest of their army. The English charged and crossed pikes with the Spanish tercio, driving it down the hill, and, by following up, the English formation became exposed. James, Duke of York, led two cavalry charges against the Cromwellian troops' flank, driving into the musketeers. Some Spanish cavalry from their reserve was sent forward and threatened the English but were defeated in turn by the French cavalry under Marquis de Castelneau. The French infantry consisting of the Guards, the Swiss and the regiments of Picardy and Turenne advanced on the Spanish centre, meeting little resistance. Marshal Turenne took advantage of the receding tide to concentrate most of his cavalry on his left, and its advance enveloped the Spanish right wing.

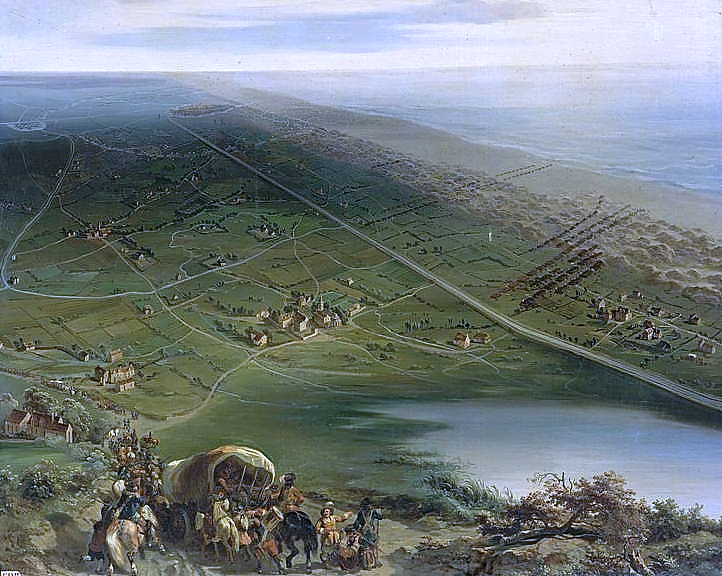
View of the Battle of Dunes from behind the Spanish lines Oil painting by Siméon Fort

Condé on the Spanish left held off the initial attacks of the French right wing and even counterattacked them, getting unhorsed and nearly captured, but in the end he was also forced from the field. The German and Walloons of the centre retired at the onset of the French infantry, throwing the Spanish cavalry in the reserve into disorder so that it was carried away in the flight.

The battle lasted for about two hours, and by noon Turenne had a complete victory that ended with the rout of the Spanish forces. The Spanish lost about 1,200 killed, 3,000 wounded and some 5,000 captured while the French lost only about 400, about half of them English. Amongst the Cromwellian troops Lockhart's regiment of foot bore the brunt of the fighting. Its lieutenant-colonel, Roger Fenwick, and two of its captains were killed, and nearly all the rest of its officers were wounded, and lost about forty or fifty other ranks killed in battle. Lillingston's lost a captain and thirty or forty killed in battle, while the other regiments suffered only slight losses (the number of English dead rose because like Fenwick they died of wounds over the next few weeks). The French pursuit lasted until nightfall. One force of Royalist guards (Note: This unit would be the core of the Royal Regiment of Guards, later the Grenadier Guards (Tucker 2010, p. 214).) held out, surrendering only when they were assured they would be allowed to rejoin Charles II at Ypres. The Duke of York's troop of guards, which charged several times with the Duke himself at its head, suffered severely, but also remained fit for further service. The King's forces after the battle numbered less than a thousand men, probably not more than seven or eight hundred. The French corps of Frondeurs on the left under the command of Condé retreated in good order.

== Aftermath ==
Following his victory, Turenne took Dunkirk and advanced, capturing a series of towns and fortresses including Furnes, Dixmunde, Gravelines, Ypres and Oudenarde. The victory at the Battle of the Dunes and its consequences would lead to the end of ten years of war with the signing of Treaty of the Pyrenees. By this treaty France gained Roussillon and Perpignan, Thionville, Montmédy and other parts of Luxembourg, Artois and towns in Flanders, including Arras, Béthune and Gravelines, and a new border with Spain was fixed at the Pyrenees. The 1659 treaty also required the Spanish king to recognise and confirm all French gains in the 1648 Peace of Westphalia.

The defeat of the Spanish relief force and the taking of Dunkirk ended the immediate prospect of a Royalist expedition to England. Dunkirk surrendered to French forces ten days after the battle on 24 June, and Cardinal Mazarin honoured the terms of the treaty with Oliver Cromwell and handed the port over to the Commonwealth. The campaign of the English contingent in Flanders did not end with the battle of the Dunes and the capture of Dunkirk. Part of the English contingent was left to garrison Dunkirk and Mardyke under the command of Sir William Lockhart, while the rest, under Sir Thomas Morgan, continued to serve with Turenne's army in the field.

While the French received all of Artois, England had eliminated the greatest Spanish privateering base with the result that merchant shipping losses were much reduced. Cromwell died two months after the battle and was succeeded by his son's protectorship, which ended nine months later, and the Commonwealth fell into confusion, whereupon Charles II returned to the throne in May 1660. Charles would sell Dunkirk back to the French in 1662 for £320,000.

== British involvement ==
The Grenadier Guards can trace their origins back to Lord Wentworth's Royal Regiment of Guards which was one of five regiments raised in 1656. The Life Guards can trace their origins back to two cavalry troops raised at this time His Majesty's Own Troop of Horse Guards and The Duke of York's Troop of Horse Guards. In the Spanish army, the Royalist contingent consisted of three battalions made up of five understrength regiments: The first battalion was commanded by Lieutenant-Colonel Thomas Blague, of Lord Bristol's regiment combined with Lord Wentworth's regiment (also known as King Charles II's footguards). The second battalion was command by Lord Muskerry and consisted of the Duke of York's regiment. The third consisted of Lord Ormond's regiment of Irish commanded by Colonel Richard Grace, and Lord Newburgh's regiment of Scots under the command of Sir William Urry. English regiments were named after their colonels. In the French army the New Model Army on the left (by the coast): Cochrane, Alsop, Lillingston and Morgan, on the right 200 Montgommery musketeers. Cavalry: Lockhart, Gibbons and Salmo (Note: Foot: Alsop, Clark, Cochrane, Lillington, Morgan, and Reynolds, horse: Lockheart ( Asquith 1981, p. 31 (alphabetically?))) (Note: Commonwealth: Foot Alsop, Clark, Cochrane, Lillington, Morgan, and Reynolds, Horse Lockheart. Five Royalist regiments: Charles's Foot Guards, three Irish Muskerry, Ormonde, Willoughby and one of Scots (Duke of Gloster), Horse one troop under the direct command of the Duke of York (Manganiello 2004, p. 171).) Two out of the three Royalist battalions, Bristol's and York's Irish, broke and fled.

== See also ==
- Henry Jones of Oxfordshire#Battle of the Dunes
