= The Battle of the Dunes =

Painting by Charles-Philippe Larivière

The Battle the Dunes
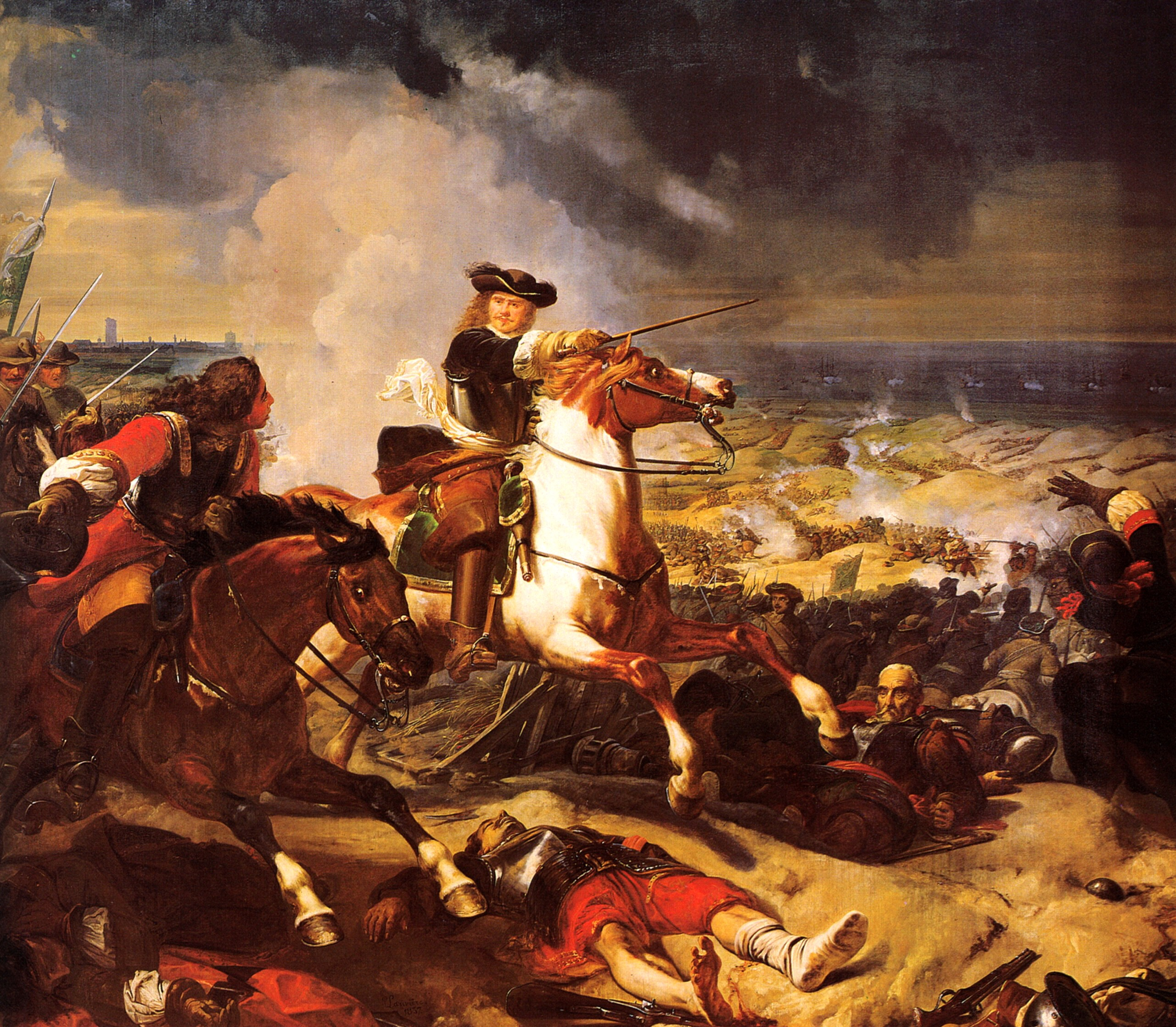
- Artist: Charles-Philippe Larivière
- Year: 1837
- Medium: Oil on canvas
- Dimensions: 465 cm × 543 cm (183 in × 214 in)
- Location: Palace of Versailles, Versailles

The Battle of the Dunes (French: La Bataille des Dunes) is an 1837 history painting by the French artist Charles-Philippe Larivière. It depicts the Battle of the Dunes, fought on 21 June 1658 outside Dunkirk. It was one of the final actions of the long-running Franco-Spanish War, ending in a decisive victory for the French and their English Republican allies. As British Royalist exiles fought alongside the defeated Spanish, it also functioned as one of the final clashes of the War of the Three Kingdoms. The painting portrays the Anglo-French commander, the Viscount of Turenne, leading a charge. In the distance is the besieged Dunkirk.

The painting was ordered in 1836 by Louis Philippe I for the newly restored Palace of Versailles. Louis Philippe commissioned a number of works glorifying French history. It was exhibited at the Salon of 1837 at the Louvre in Paris. Today it hangs in the Galerie des Batailles at Versailles.

== Bibliography ==
- Axelrod, Alan. 100 Turning Points in Military History: The Critical Decisions, Key Events, and Breakthrough Inventions and Discoveries That Shaped Warfare Around the World. Rowman & Littlefield, 2019.
- Livesey, Anthony. Battles of the Great Commanders. Tiger Books International, 1990.
