= Fort-Mardyck =

Coordinates: 51.031°N 2.3061°E

Location of Fort-Mardyck in Nord-Pas-de-Calais

Fort-Mardyck (French pronunciation: [fɔʁ maʁdik]; Dutch: Fort-Mardijk; West Flemish: Fort-Mardyk) is a former commune in the Nord department in northern France. It has been part of the commune of Dunkirk since 9 December 2010. In 2022 it had 3,491 inhabitants.

== History ==
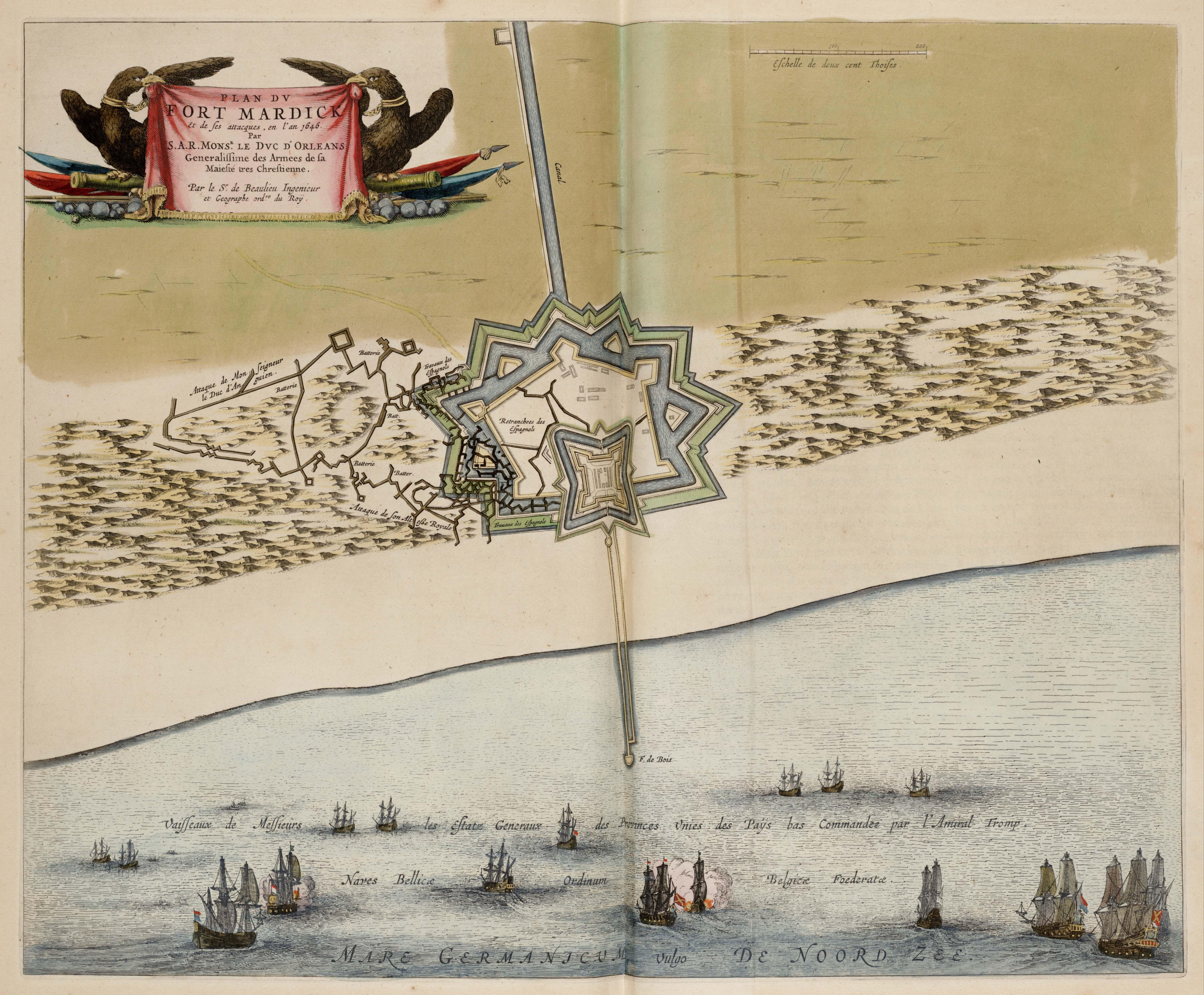
A map of the fort of Mardyck and the attacks of 1646, from the Atlas van Loon.

The fort of Mardyck was constructed in 1622 by architect Jean Gamel. It was built for the Spanish who ruled Flanders at the time. The fort was captured by the French in 1644 but then lost to the Spanish in 1652. The fort was again besieged and captured by an Anglo-French force under the Comte de Turrenne on 21 September 1657. Turenne handed the fort over to the English Commonwealth in accordance with the terms of their involvement. The following month the Spanish attempted to retake the fort one last time but the English garrison managed to repel the assault. After having bought Dunkirk and the fort of Mardyck from the English in 1662, King Louis XIV of France ordered that the fort be dismantled.

On 12 February 1867, a French imperial decree established Fort-Mardyck as an independent municipality.

=== Heraldry ===
Flag of Fort-Mardyck

Arms of Fort-Mardyck	The arms of Fort-Mardyck are blazoned : Gules, unicorn salient argent, on a chief a sun in her splendour, all within a bordure Or. (The emblazon shows a per fess field, which would make more sense, rather than a field and chief...)

== Notable people ==
- Gilbert Zoonekynd (born 1956) - Footballer and Coach was born here.
