= Danckerts =

Danckert is a Dutch surname. Notable people with the surname include:

- Cornelis Danckerts de Ry (1561–1634), Dutch Golden Age architect and sculptor
- Dancker Danckerts (1634–1666), Dutch engraver and publisher
- Ghiselin Danckerts (c. 1510–1567), Dutch Renaissance composer and singer
- Hendrick Danckerts (c. 1625–1680), Dutch Golden Age painter
- Johan Danckerts (c. 1616–1686), Dutch etcher and painter
- Justus Danckerts (1635–1701), Dutch engraver and print publisher
- Peter Danckerts de Rij (1605–1660), Dutch golden age painter

== See also ==
- Dankert
- Danckert
