= Danckert =

Danckert is a surname. Notable people with the surname include:

- Jack Danckert (1922–2000), Australian rules footballer
- Peter Danckert (1940–2022), German politician
- Werner Danckert (1900–1970), German folk song researcher

== See also ==
- Danckerts
- Dankert
