= Holbein Gate =

Former gateway in Whitehall, London

Coordinates: 51°30′15″N 0°07′35″W

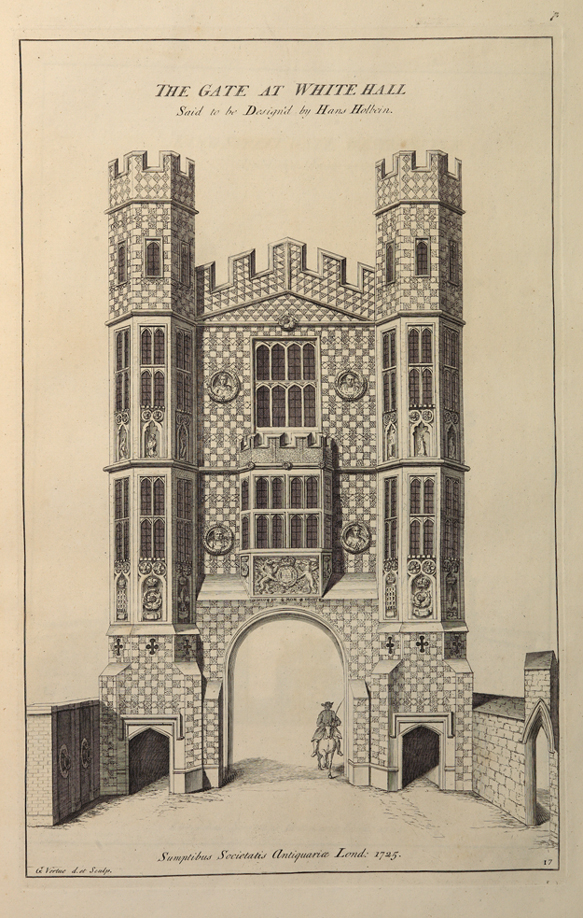
The Gate at Whitehall (Holbein Gate) from George Vertue's Vetusta Monumenta Vol.1, 1747 (1826)

The Holbein Gate was a monumental gateway across Whitehall in Westminster, constructed in 1531–32 in the English Gothic style. The Holbein Gate and a second less ornate gate, Westminster Gate, were constructed by Henry VIII to connect parts of the Tudor Palace of Whitehall to the east and west of the road. It was one of two substantial parts of the Palace of Whitehall to survive a catastrophic fire in January 1698, the other being Inigo Jones's classical Banqueting House. The Holbein Gate was described by Thomas Pennant as "the most beautiful gate at Whitehall". It was demolished in August 1759 to allow better movement of traffic and was possibly going to be re-erected in Windsor Great Park, but its materials were dispersed instead.

== Description ==
The name of Holbein Gate reflects a tradition that it was designed by Hans Holbein, although any connection with Holbein seems unlikely. It was also known as the King's Gate or the Cockpit Gate, being close to the Royal Cockpit. The Westminster Gate or Kings Street Gate further south was built in a simpler more classical style with circular corner towers and domed turrets, and was demolished in 1723. The Holbein Gate is shown in drawings and engravings, including an engraving made by George Vertue in 1725 and published in 1747 in Vol. I of Vetusta Monumenta.

The gate was a rectangular building of three floors, with the principal rooms on the upper two floors. Projecting square bases on each corner supporting octagonal towers and turrets. A passageway between the towers approximately 12 feet (3.7 m) wide allowed traffic to pass beneath a flat archway, with one footway to the east and possibly a second footway to the west through the towers (although the west footway may have been blocked and then cleared). Above the arch was an oriel window with two row of six lights (one to either side and four in the centre) on the first floor, and a window of four lights in a double row on the first floor. The top of the tower was surmounted by a parapet with battlements. Each face of the octagonal towers had two-light windows in double rows. Both sides of the gate were faced with chequerboard patterns of flint and stone, and also decorative carved panels, including a royal coat of arms above the arch, gryphons holding shields, and other royal emblems, such as the portcullis, fleur-de-lys and Tudor rose. Roundels to either side of the large central windows held with busts, possibly by Giovanni da Maiano. (Three terracotta busts by Pietro Torrigiano owned by the Wright family in Hatfield Peverel until the 1920s were thought to come from the Gate, but later scholarship doubts any connection.) The arch was later filled in down to the springing, flattening its profile. A gallery to the west overlooked the Royal Tiltyard (now Horse Guards Parade) leading eventually to St James's Park. Another gallery led to the Cockpit.

The upper storey was used as the Paper Office, from perhaps 1672 until 1756. The lower storey was used as lodgings. Residents included Duke of Lennox in around 1620, later General Lambert until 1657 and then Viscount Fauconberg. It was occupied by Lady Castlemaine from around 1664 to around 1670 and then by her daughter, the Countess of Sussex. William Van Huls, Clerk of the Queen's Robes and Wardrobes, was the occupant in 1712.

== Demolition ==
Like the gate at Temple Bar on Fleet Street, the Holbein Gate obstructed the movement of traffic along the road below. Proposals for its demolition were put forward in the early part of the 18th century, but were successfully opposed by John Vanbrugh and others. The gate was left in place when the King Street Gate was demolished in 1723, but the filled-in segment of the arch was cleared to increase headroom for traffic passing below.

The adjacent red brick Van Huls house (depicted by Canaletto in a painting of 1747 at Goodwood House) was acquired in March 1759, and the arch and the house were demolished in August 1759. There were plans for the Duke of Cumberland to rebuild the gate in Windsor Great Park, but in the end it seems that the materials were incorporated in repairs to other buildings.

== Gallery ==
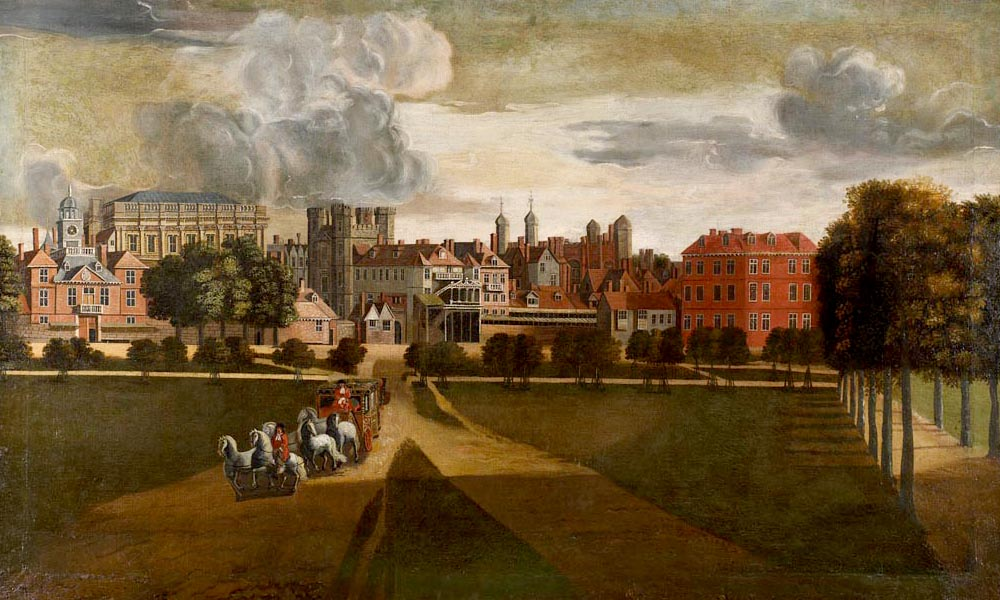
The Palace of Whitehall by Hendrick Danckerts, c. 1675, viewed from St. James's Park looking east. The four-towered building left of centre is the palace gatehouse, the "Holbein Gate".

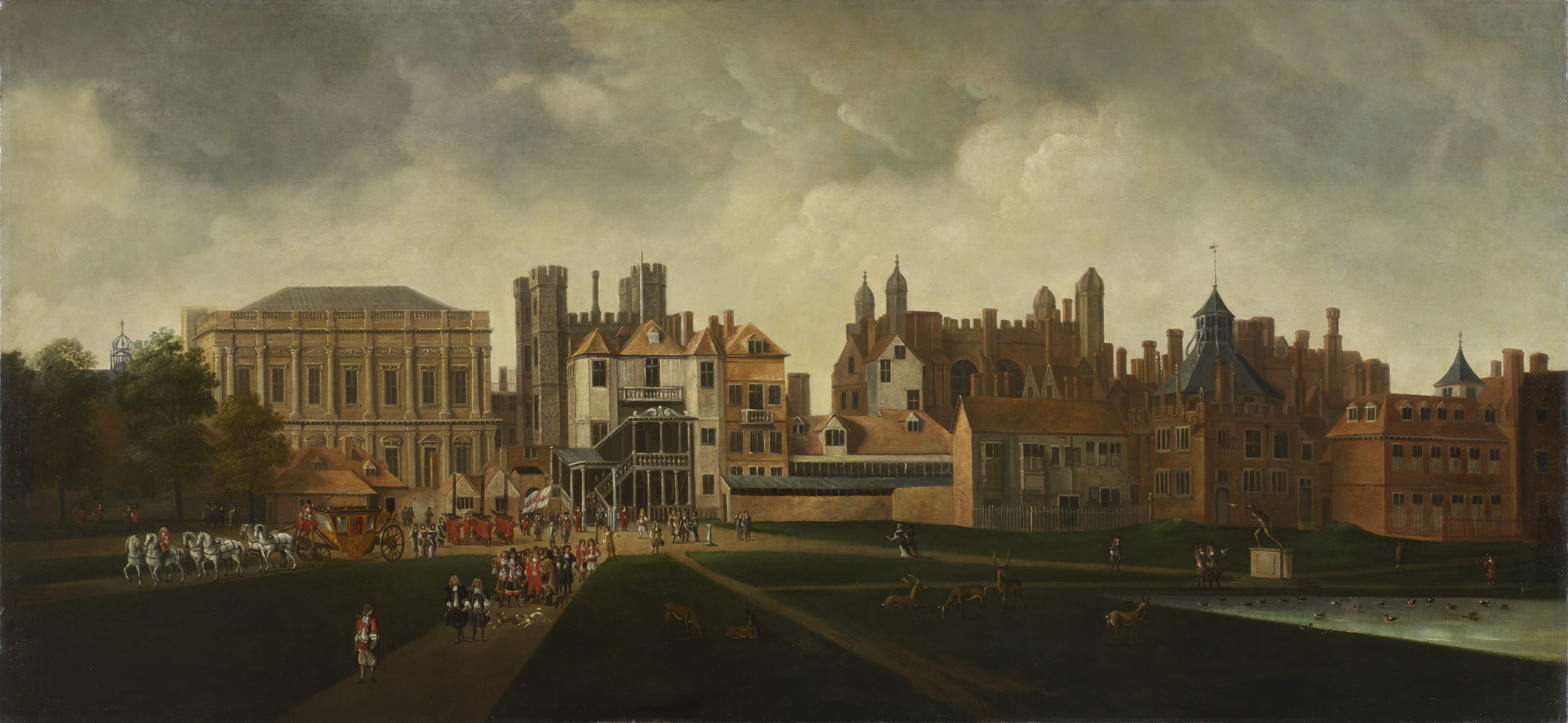
Palace of Whitehall from St James's Park by Hendrick Danckerts, c. 1675. The turrets of the gatehouse are visible in the background

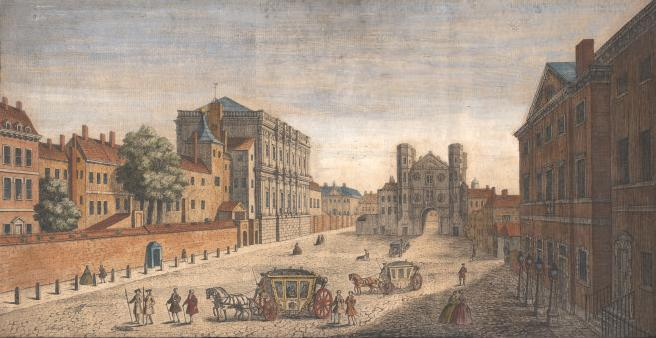
Whitehall, looking south in 1740: Inigo Jones' Banqueting House (1622) on the left, William Kent's Treasury buildings (1733–37) on the right, the Holbein Gate (1532, demolished 1759) at centre.

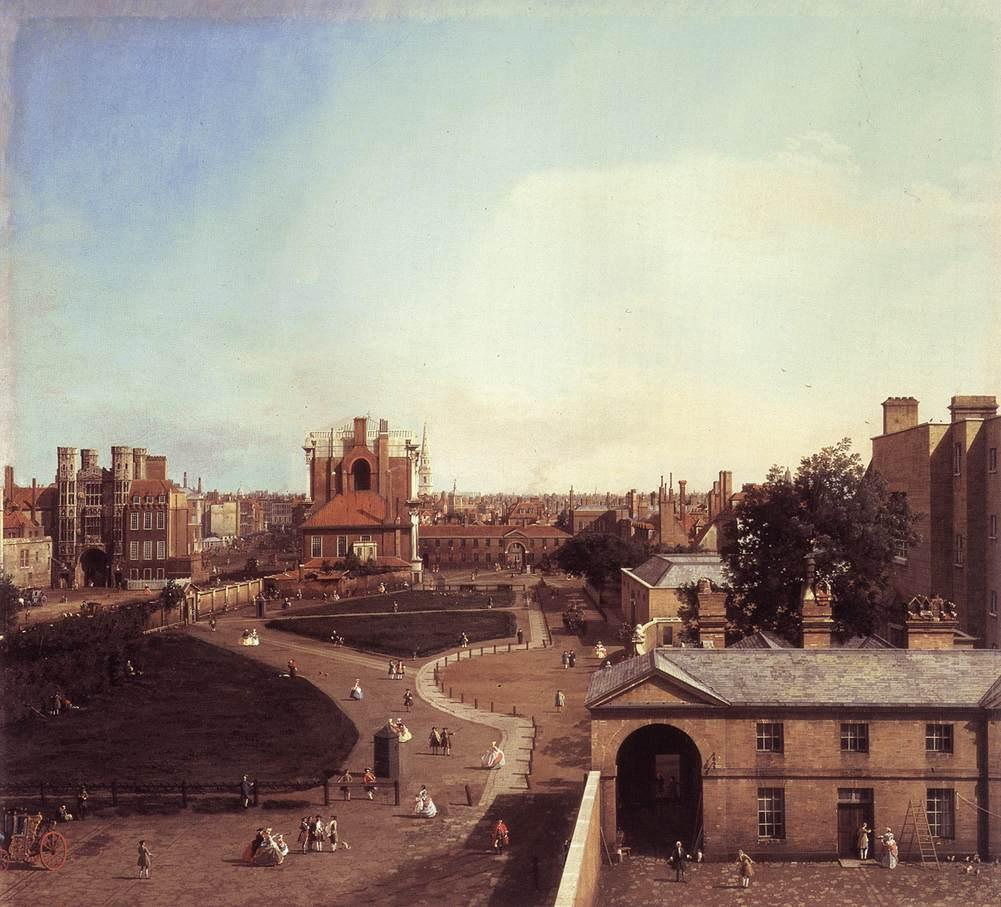
Whitehall and the Privy Garden from Richmond House, Canaletto, 1747, view from Richmond House looking north over the Privy Garden to the Holbein Gate (far left) and Banqueting House (centre, seen end-on).

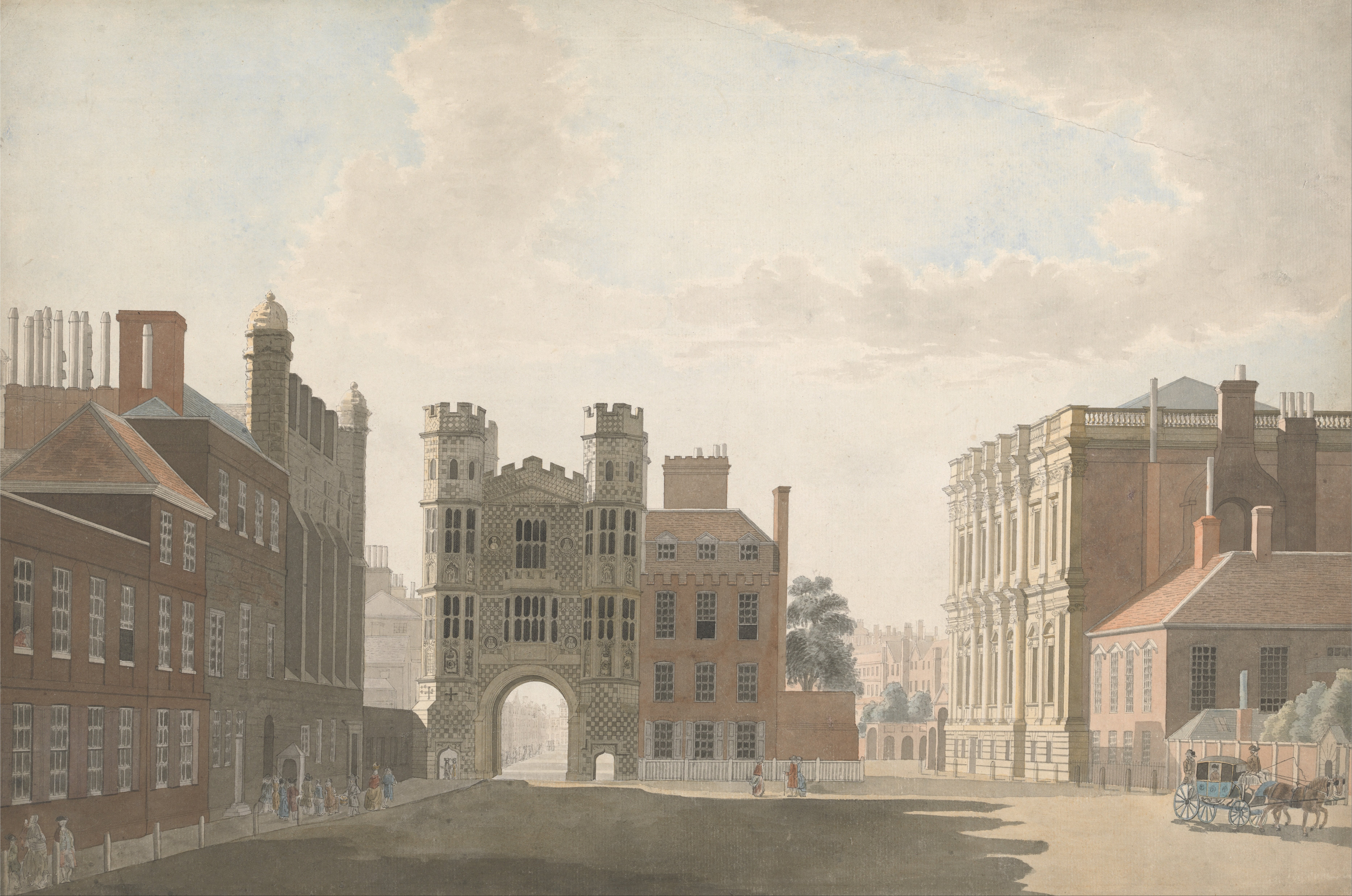
Whitehall Showing Holbein's Gate and Banqueting Hall, Thomas Sandby, c. 1760, viewed from the south

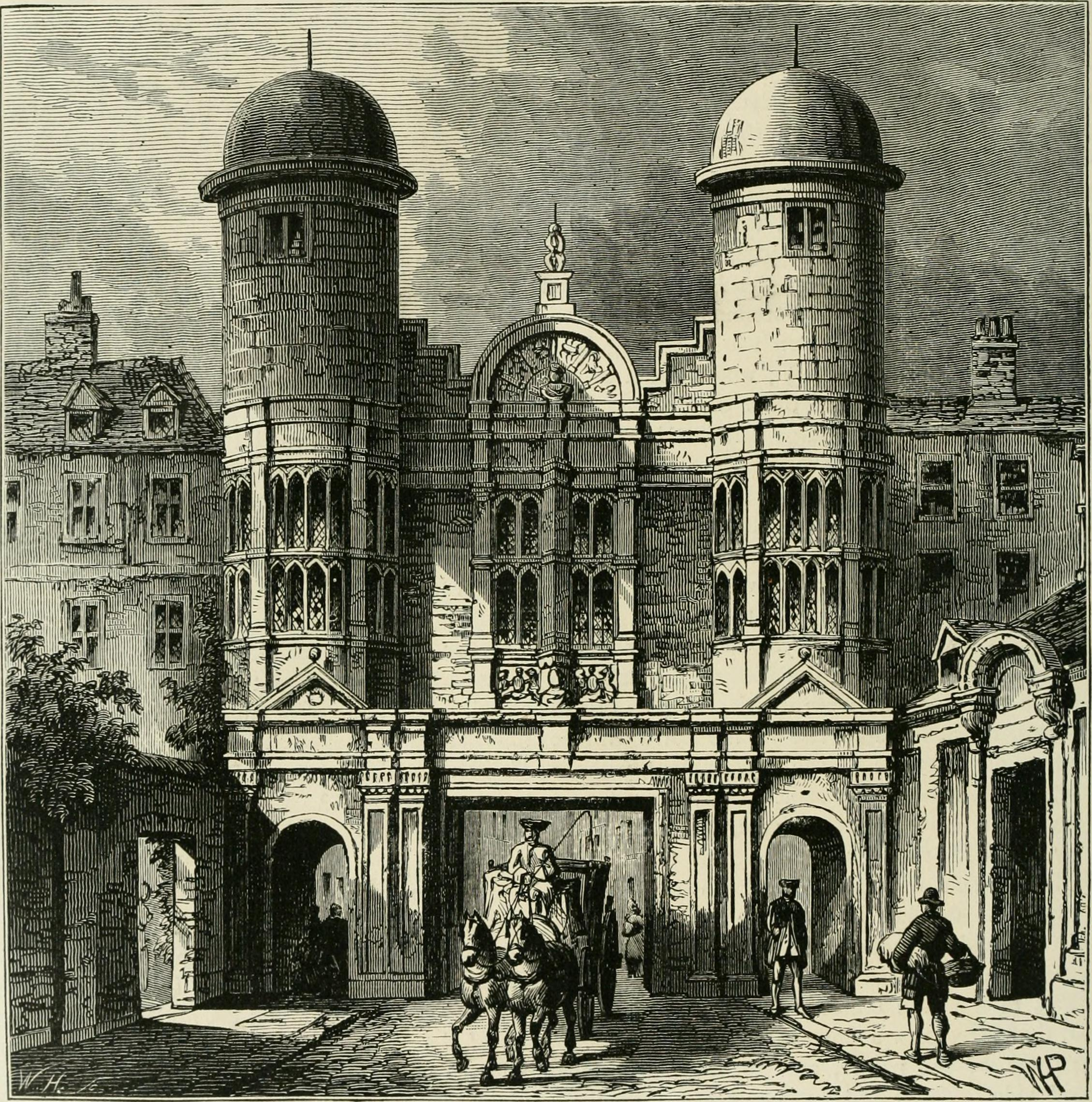
The Westminster Gate, also known as the Kings Street Gate, or The South Gate at Whitehall
