= Palace of Whitehall from St James's Park =

Painting by Hendrick Danckerts

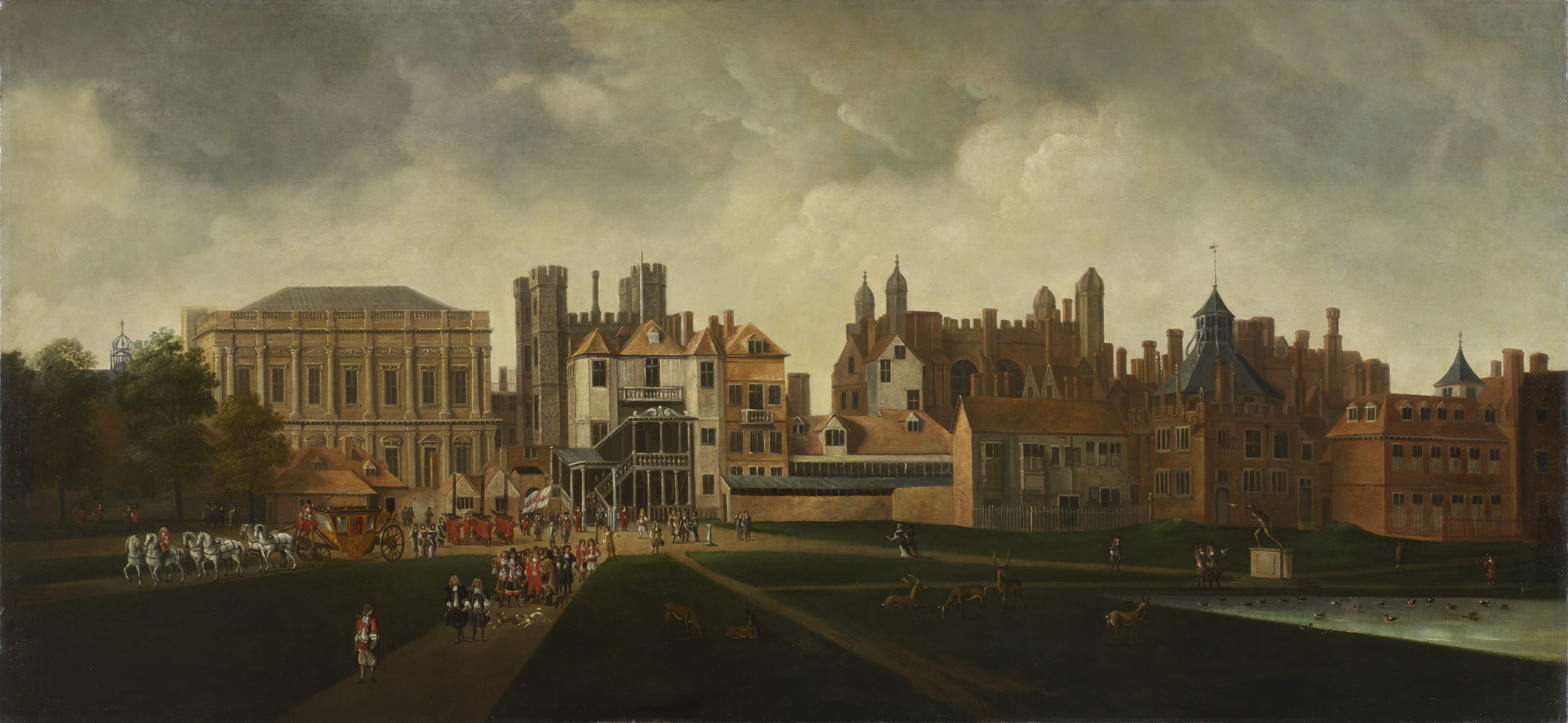
- Artist: Hendrick Danckerts
- Year: c.1675
- Type: Oil on canvas, landscape painting
- Dimensions: 105.5 cm × 227 cm (41.5 in × 89 in)
- Location: Government Art Collection; London

Palace of Whitehall from St James's Park is a c.1675 landscape painting by the Dutch artist Hendrick Danckerts. A cityscape it features a view of the historic Palace of Whitehall in London as seen from nearby St James's Park. It captures the layout of the buildings of the complex during the Restoration era with the Banqueting House designed by Inigo Jones on the left, the turrets of Holbein Gate in the centre and The Cockpit on the right. In the group walking in front of the palace is Charles II, accompanied either by his brother the Duke of York or his cousin Prince Rupert as well as his dogs. To the left is the royal coach and a detachment of the Coldstream Guards.

Much of the palace was desroyed by a major fire in 1698 and only the Banqueting House remains. Today the painting is in the Government Art Collection which acquired it in 1976.

== Bibliography ==
- Astington, John H. English Court Theatre, 1558-1642. Cambridge University Press, 2006.
- Thurley, Simon. Whitehall Palace: The Official Illustrated History. Merrell, 2008.
