= Charles II Presented with a Pineapple =

Painting associated with Hendrick Danckerts

Charles II Presented with the First Pineapple Grown in England
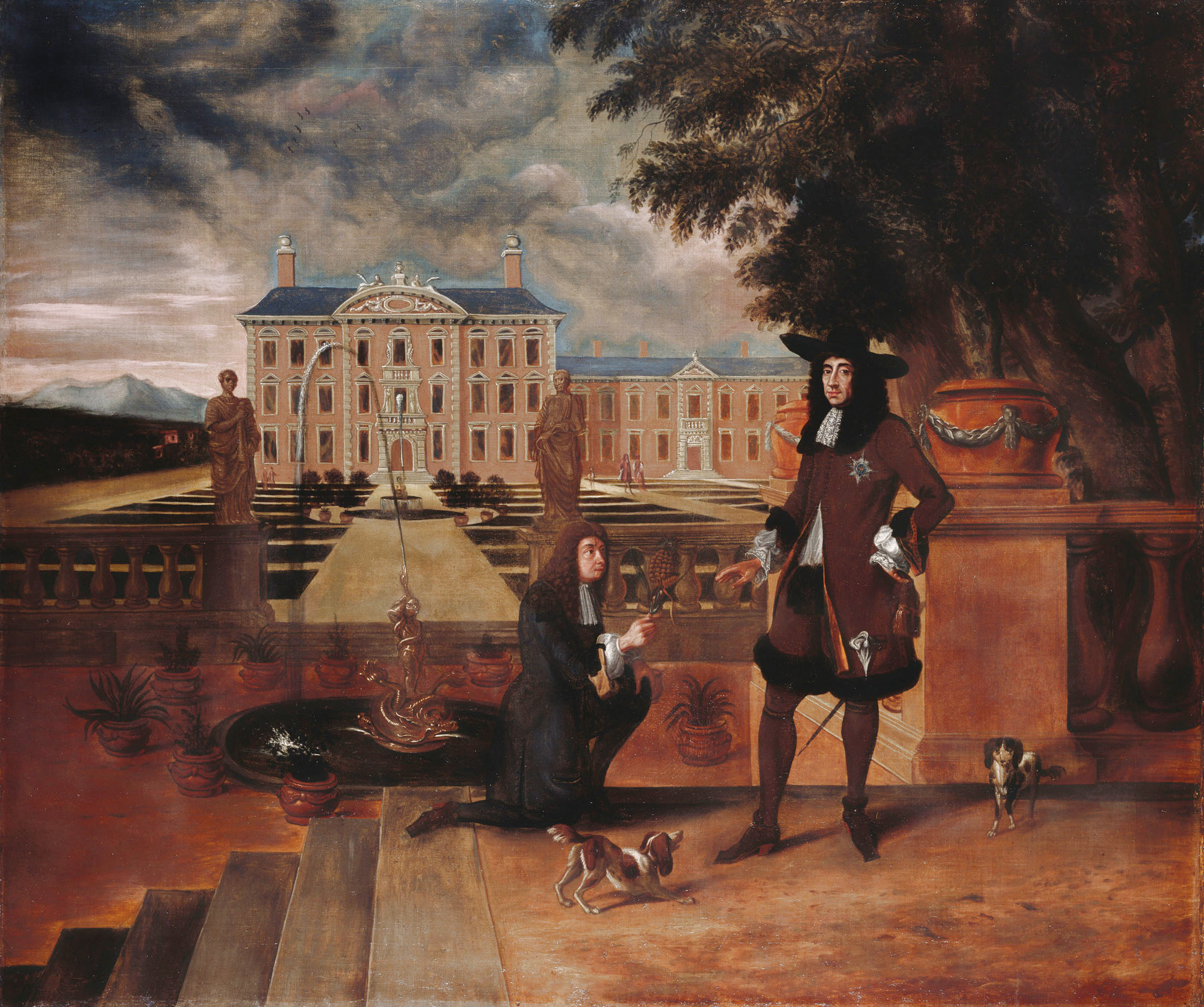
- Artist: Copy after Hendrick Danckerts
- Year: c. 1675-1680
- Medium: Oil on canvas
- Dimensions: 115 cm × 97 cm (45 in × 38 in)
- Location: Royal Collection, Windsor Castle, London
- Accession: RCIN 406896

Charles II Presented with the First Pineapple Grown in England is a 17th-century painting associated with the Dutch artist Hendrick Danckerts. The work depicts King Charles II of England receiving a pineapple from the royal gardener John Rose, an exotic fruit that was at the time considered rare and highly valuable. The painting belongs to what is conventionally described as the British school of the late 17th century and is dated to approximately 1675–1680.

The composition is known in four painted versions, two of which are attributed by art historians to Danckerts himself.

== Description ==
At the centre of the composition is the kneeling royal gardener John Rose, presenting the first pineapple cultivated in England to King Charles II.

To the right of the gardener stands the king, dressed in fashionable clothing of the 1670s, wearing a long coat adorned with the star of the Order of the Garter. The knee-length brown coat is executed in a style believed to have been introduced by the monarch himself in October 1666. Beneath the coat, with its large turned-back cuffs, the king wears a linen shirt and knee-length breeches trimmed with black ribbons at the waist and knees. His shoes feature square toes and red heels, then at the height of fashion. Around his neck is a lace jabot, a characteristic element of male dress in the second half of the 17th century, and on his head he wears a black wig and a hat, probably made of beaver fur.

Art historians have noted the particularly strong likeness of the king in the later years of his life and the rarity of his depiction in ordinary, non-ceremonial clothing. The painting is unusual in that Charles II is not shown in armour or formal regalia, but in contemporary everyday dress reflecting current fashion trends.

The pineapple presented to the king by the gardener was regarded in the 17th century as a symbol of wealth and exotic luxury, an object sought after and displayed by European royal courts. Such imagery underscored the monarch’s status and demonstrated the prestige of the English royal court.

In the background, the painting depicts a formal garden and a large country estate, possibly Dorney Court near Oatlands Palace.

== Attribution ==
Although no documentary evidence relating to the original commission of the painting survives, its attribution is based on stylistic similarities with other works by Danckerts and on historical catalogues of the Royal Collection.

The earliest of the four known versions was probably painted in 1677, the year of John Rose’s death, and represents an early example of the conversation piece genre. This type of informal group portrait originated in the Netherlands in the 17th century and became popular in England in the early 18th century.

The dating to 1677 is further supported by the fact that Charles II is shown without a moustache, which he is known to have shaved in that year.

== Provenance ==
The painting now held in the Royal Collection was presented in 1926 to Queen Mary by her lady-in-waiting and friend Lady Georgiana Mount Stephen. Prior to this, it had been in the collection of the Campbell family, Marquesses of Breadalbane.

== Historical context ==
Following the Restoration of the monarchy in 1660, Charles II actively supported artistic projects and collected works of art. In the 17th century, the pineapple was perceived as a symbol of success, trade, and international connections, as its acquisition and cultivation required significant effort and specialised glasshouses.

Court gardeners such as John Rose are mentioned in English sources as figures involved in the development of greenhouse horticulture and early attempts to cultivate exotic plants.

== Original, copies and engravings ==
The composition is known in four painted versions, and there has been scholarly disagreement regarding which of these should be attributed to Danckerts. Experts at Christie’s maintain that two paintings by Danckerts are held in private collections (one at Houghton Hall in Norfolk, and another sold at Christie’s in 2018 for £488,000), while the painting in the Royal Collection is, in their view, a later copy. The Royal Collection painting is catalogued as “Previously attributed to Hendrick Danckerts”.

The fourth version was painted by the copyist Thomas Hewart in 1787 for Ham House.

The subject was frequently reproduced in engravings and prints after the original composition. An example dated 1823, based on Danckerts’s design, is held in the British Museum. Additional works produced in the 18th century after the original composition attest to the enduring popularity of the image.
