= List of palaces in the United Kingdom =

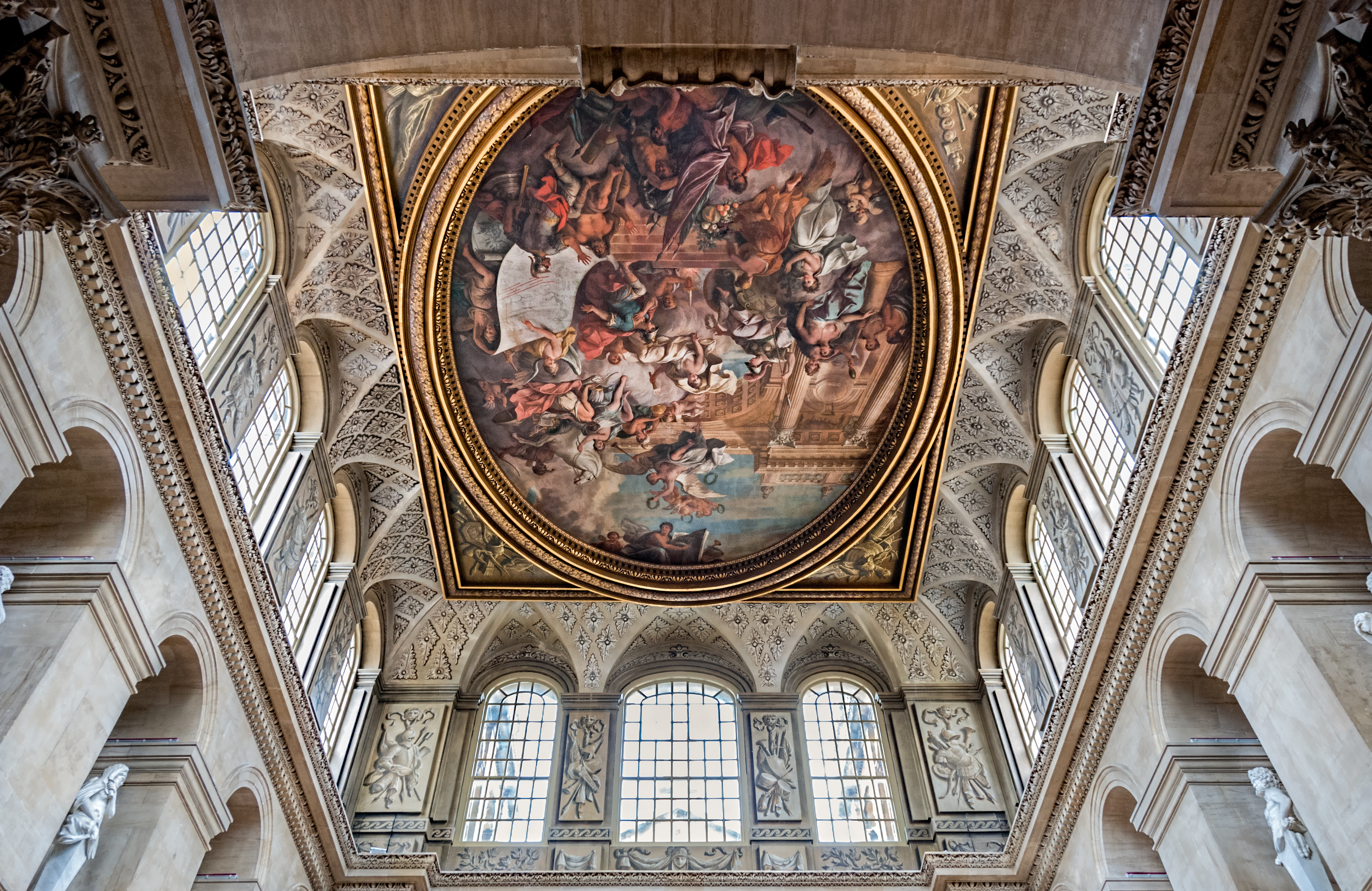
Blenheim Palace, Oxfordshire

In the United Kingdom, some royal residences and episcopal residences are referred to as palaces. A palace is typically distinguished from a castle in that the latter is fortified or has the style of a fortification, whereas a palace does not.

In England, Blenheim Palace is the only stately home to bear that title which was not formerly a royal or episcopal residence. In Scotland, some stately homes are called palaces. The list is incomplete.

== England ==
=== Official Royal Residences ===
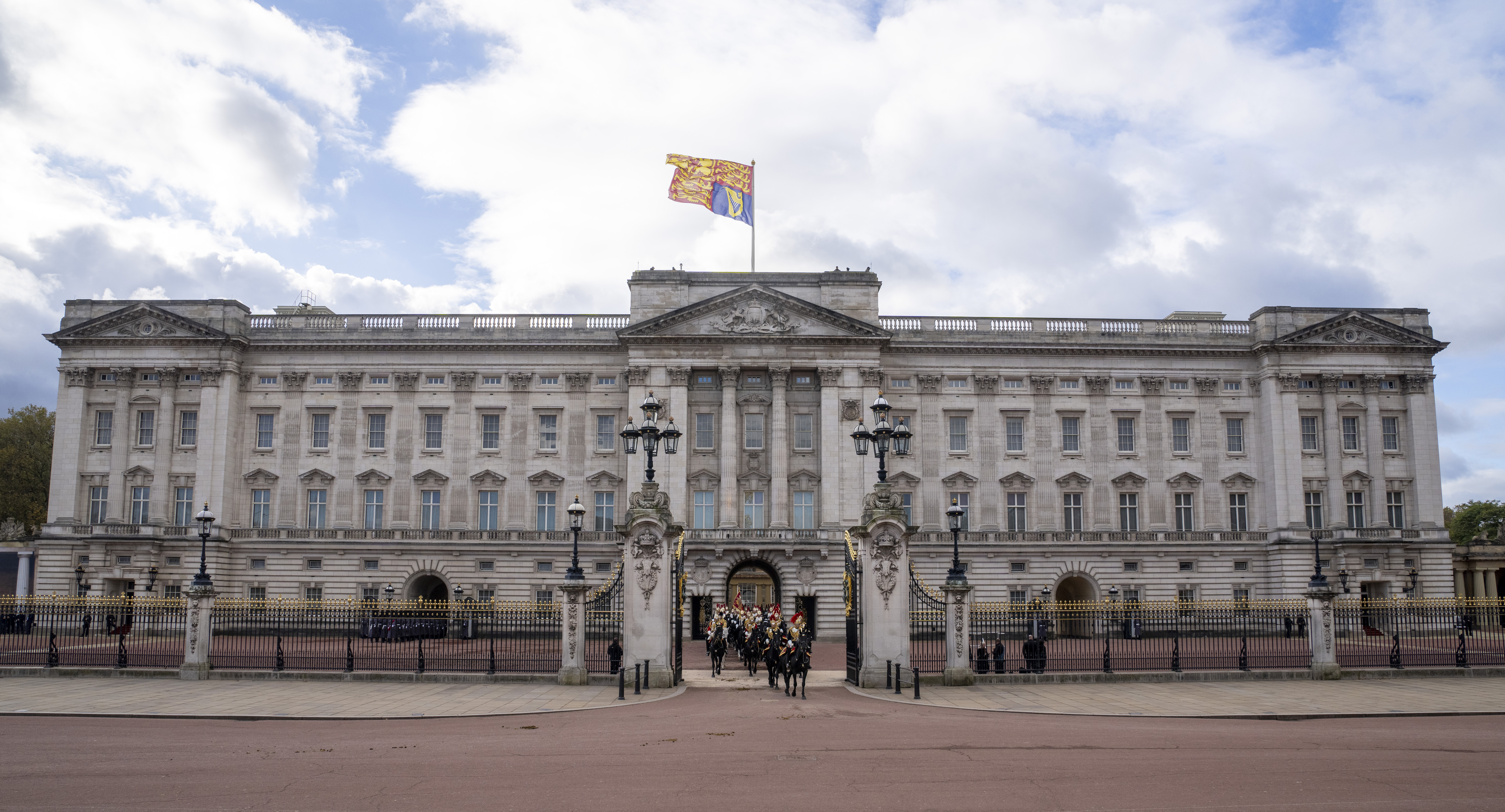
- Buckingham Palace, London
  St James's Palace – the most senior royal residence in London. It was a principal residence of the monarch from 1702 until 1837. It is the official London residence of some members of the royal family.
- Buckingham Palace – the monarch's principal London residence since 1837.
- Kensington Palace – a royal residence since 1689, but not a principal residence of the monarch since 1760. It is the official London residence of some members of the royal family.

=== Other Royal Palaces ===
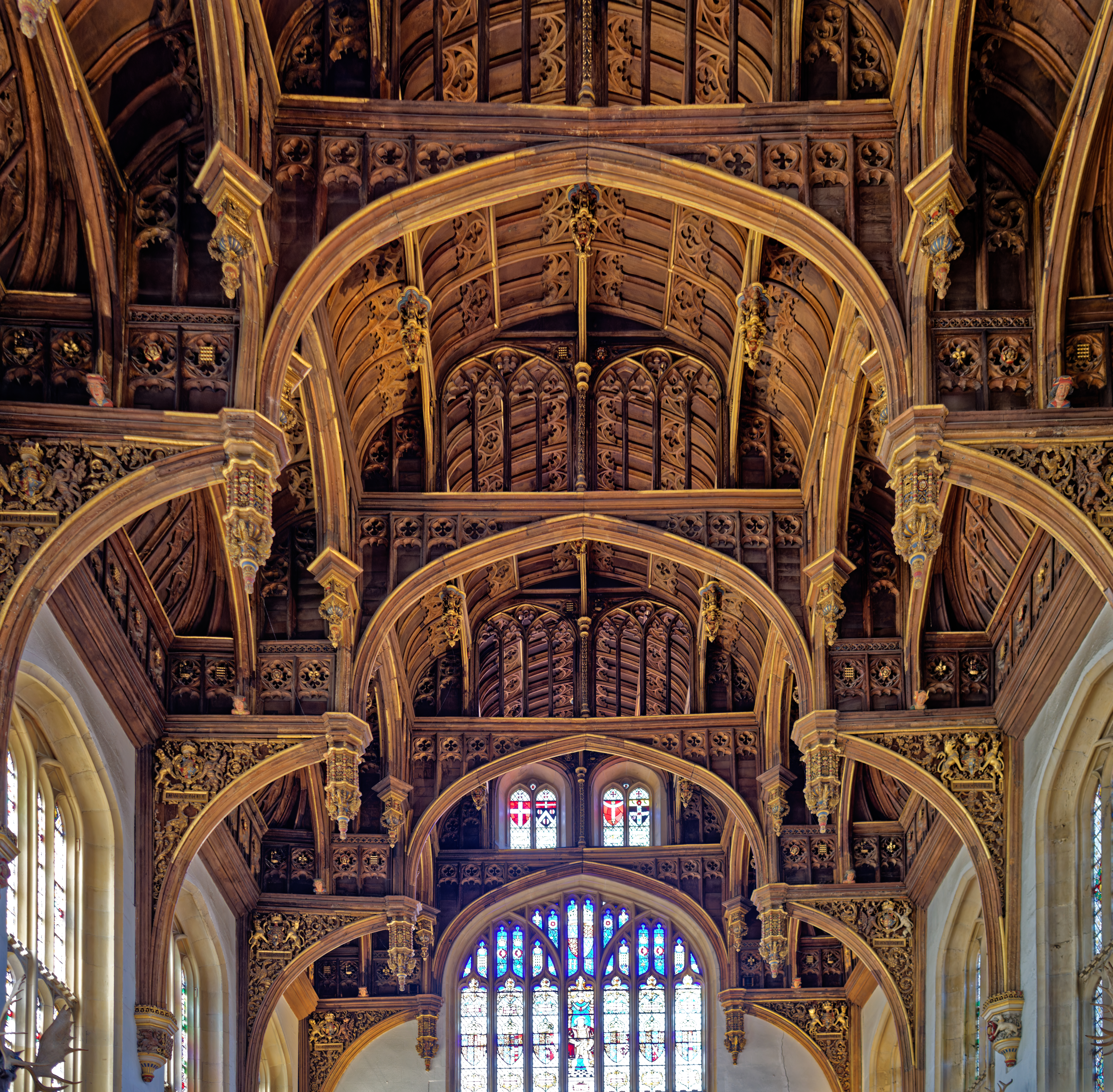
- The Great Hall inside Hampton Court Palace
  Kew Palace – once occupied by some of the family of George II and George III. Buildings now largely destroyed. Kew Gardens and houses now managed by Historic Royal Palaces.
- Hampton Court Palace – a royal residence from 1529 until 1760. Home to certain Grace and favour residents until the last died in 2017. Now managed by Historic Royal Palaces.
- Palace of Westminster – the monarch's official London residence from 1049 until 1530. Now the home of the British Parliament
- Palace of Whitehall – the monarch's official London residence from 1530 until 1698. Mostly demolished, except for the Banqueting House, now managed by Historic Royal Palaces.

=== Former Royal Palaces ===
- Eltham Palace – a royal residence from 1305 until 1649. Rebuilt as a house after falling into ruin, it was later used by the Army and is now a museum.
- Apethorpe Palace
- Holdenby Palace – largely demolished
- Richmond Palace – a royal residence from 1497 until 1649, now ruined
- Bridewell Palace – a royal residence from 1515 until 1523, now demolished.
- Palace of Placentia – also known as Greenwich Palace, a royal residence from 1447 until 1660, when it was demolished
- Palace of Beaulieu – a royal residence from 1515 until 1573
- Nonsuch Palace – a royal residence from 1538 until 1683, when it was demolished
- Oatlands Palace
- Canute's Palace, Southampton
- Savoy Palace – now destroyed. Residence
- Clarendon Palace
- Havering Palace
- Kings Langley Palace
- Woking Palace
- Woodstock Palace
- Beaumont Palace

=== Episcopal Palaces ===
(see Episcopal palace and Bishop's palace)

- Lambeth Palace – residence of the Archbishop of Canterbury in London
- Old Palace, Canterbury – residence of the Archbishop of Canterbury
- Bishopthorpe Palace – residence of the Archbishop of York
- Bishop's Palace, Lichfield
- Bishop's Palace, Wells
- The Palace, Chichester

=== Former Episcopal Palaces ===
- Addington Palace – former residence of the Archbishop of Canterbury near London
- Archbishop's Palace, Maidstone – former residence of the Archbishop of Canterbury
- Mayfield Old Palace – former residence of the Archbishop of Canterbury
- Fulham Palace – former residence of the Bishop of London in London
- Winchester Palace – former residence of the Bishop of Winchester in London
- Bromley Palace – former residence of the Bishop of Rochester near London
- Bishop's Waltham Palace – former residence of the Bishop of Winchester
- Mathern Palace – former residence of the Bishop of Llandaff
- Buckden Towers – former residence of the Bishop of Lincoln
- Archbishop's Palace, York
- Old Palace, Hatfield House
- Bishop's Palace, Ely
- Old Palace, York
- Old Bishop's Palace, Chester
- Bishop's Palace, Lichfield
- Lincoln Medieval Bishop's Palace
- The Old Palace, Worcester

=== Other Palaces ===
- Blenheim Palace – residence of the Dukes of Marlborough

== Scotland ==
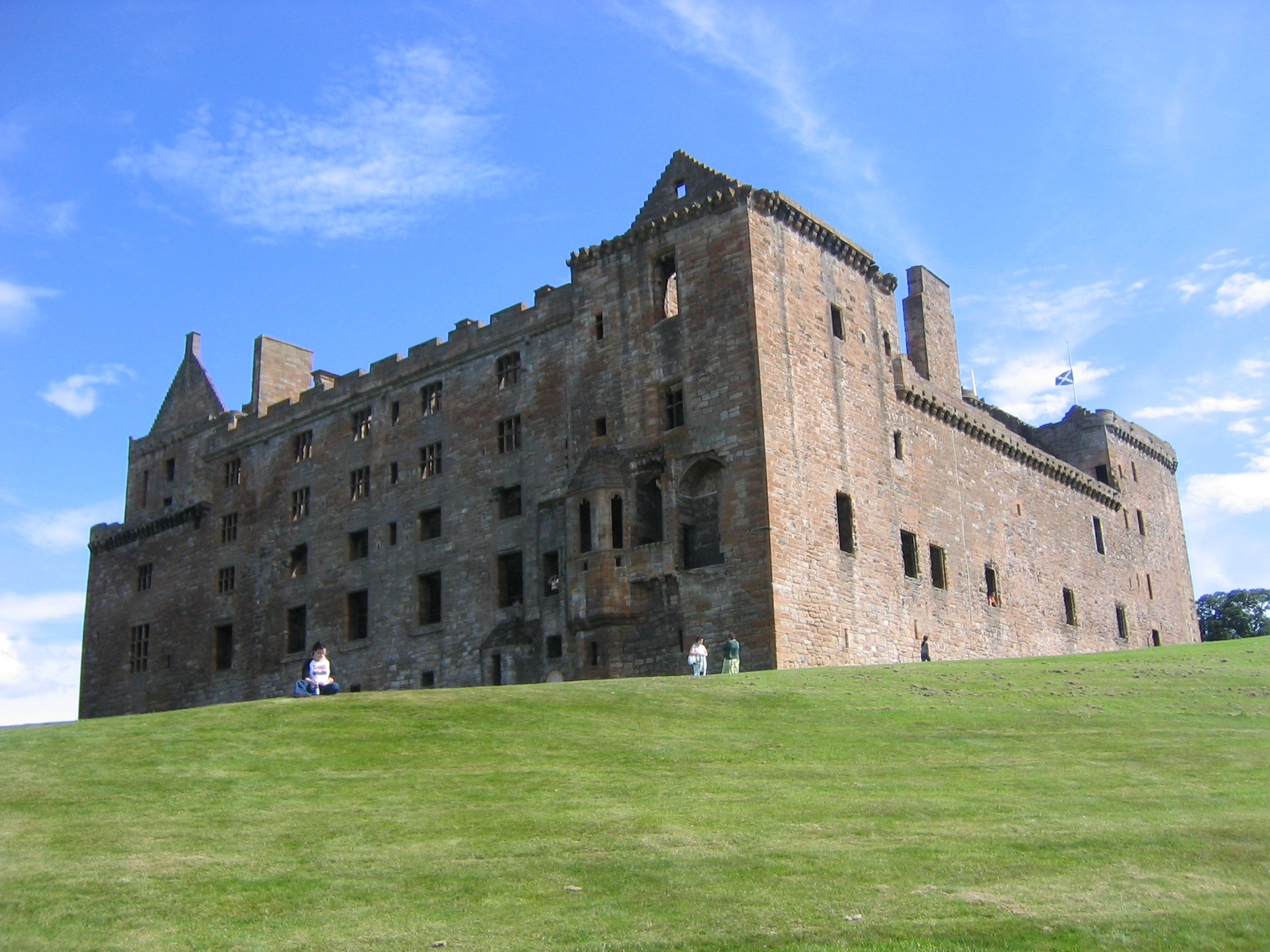
Linlithgow Palace, Scotland

- Palace of Holyroodhouse – official residence of the Scottish monarchs and the British monarchs in Scotland since 1503
- Royal Palace, Stirling Castle
- Dalkeith Palace – former seat of the Duke of Buccleuch
- Dunfermline Palace – former palace of the Scottish monarchs
- Edinburgh Castle – former palace of the Scottish monarchs
- Falkland Palace – former palace of the Scottish monarchs
- Hamilton Palace – former seat of the Duke of Hamilton
- Linlithgow Palace – former palace of the Scottish monarchs
- Scone Palace – seat of the Earl of Mansfield
- Seton Palace – former seat of the Earl of Winton
- Spynie Palace – former seat of the Bishop of Moray

== Wales ==
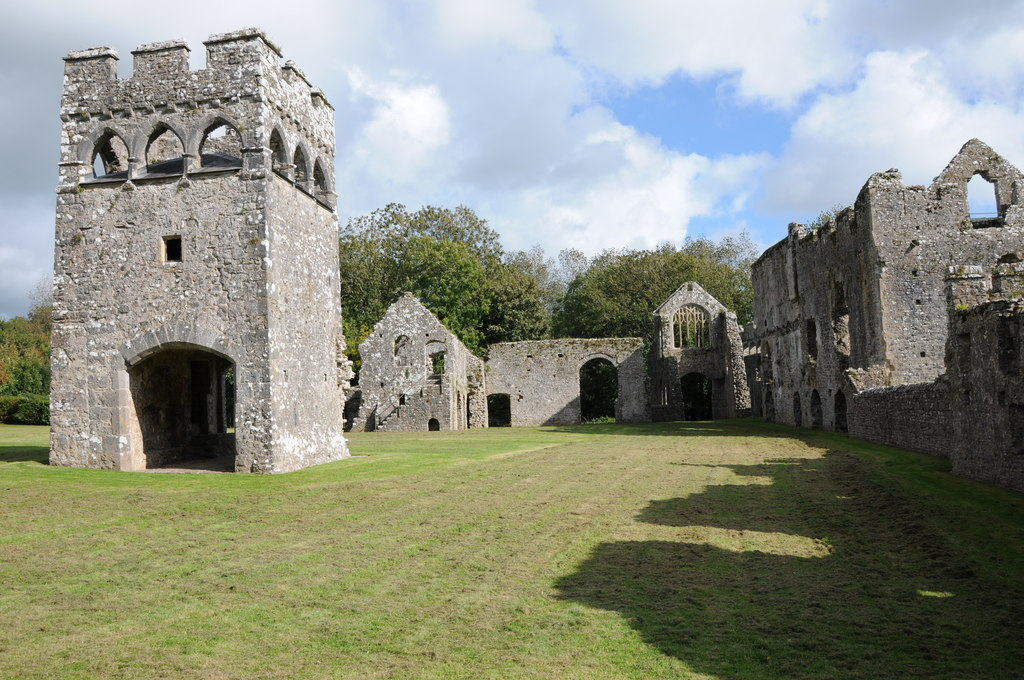
Lamphey Bishop's Palace

- Bishop's Palace, Llandaff
- Lamphey Bishop's Palace
- Llanddew
- Mathern Palace
- St Davids Bishops Palace
