= Johan Danckerts =

Dutch etcher and painter

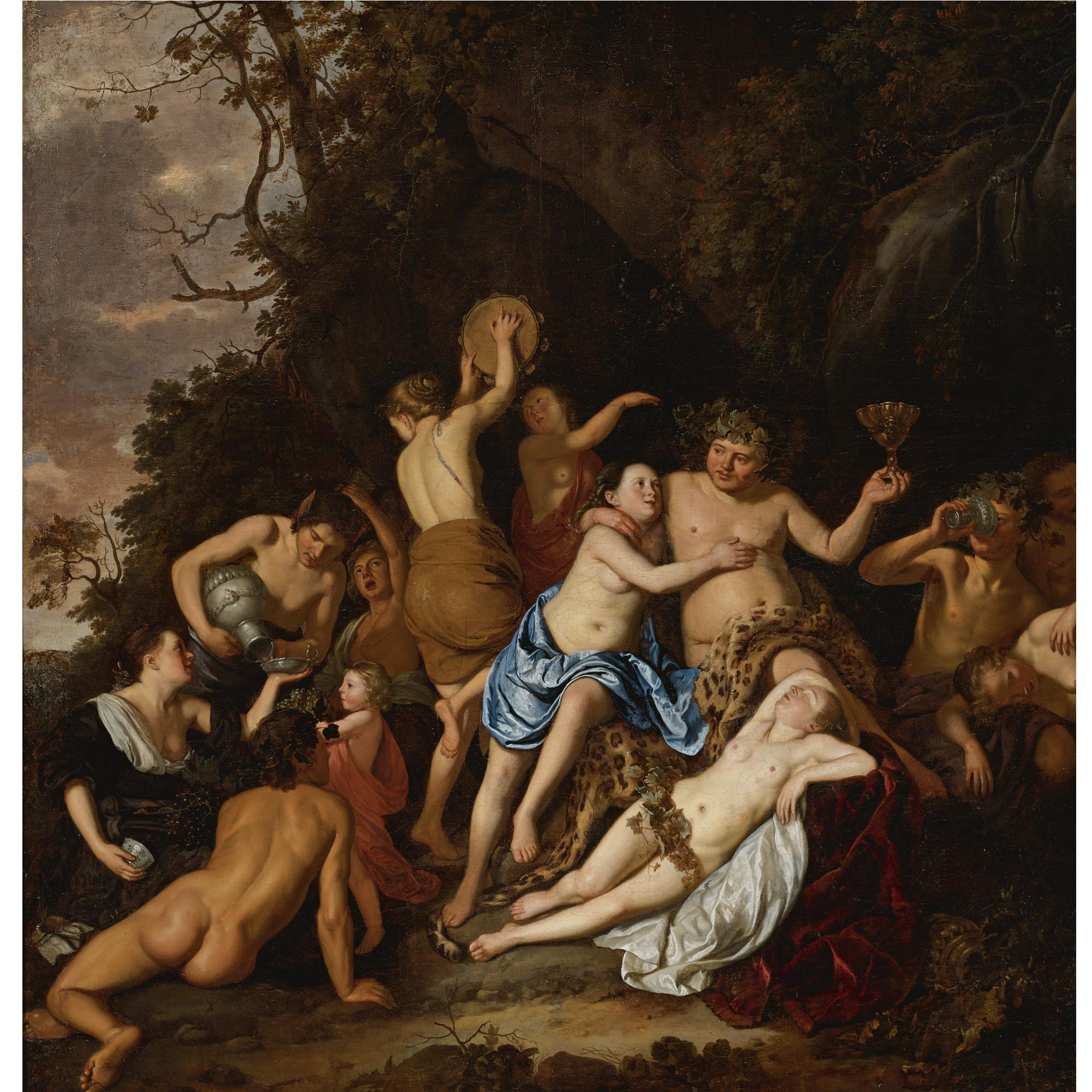
A Bacchanal, loosely based on Titian's The Bacchanal of the Andrians

Johan Danckerts (c. 1616, The Hague - 19 October 1686, Haarlem) was a Dutch etcher and painter.

In 1631, Danckerts entered the guild of St. Luke at the Hague, of which he was dean from 1650 to 1652. In 1653 he went to Rome where he stayed until 1658. In that year he moved to England for 18 years. After returning to The Hague, he spent the last years of his life in Amsterdam and Haarlem.

He painted historical subjects and portraits, and made some of the designs for the plates which Wenceslaus Hollar engraved for Robert Stapylton's edition of Juvenal, published in 1660. Hollar engraved also after him a head of John Price, the biblical critic. He likewise etched a few plates, including Venus reclining, after Titian, and an Embarkation of Merchandise.

Johan was the older brother of Hendrick Danckerts.
