= Dankert =

Dankert is a surname. Notable people with the surname include:

- Bastian Dankert (born 1980), German football referee
- Billy Dankert, American musician
- Piet Dankert (1934–2003), Dutch politician

== See also ==
- Danckert
