= Palace of Whitehall =

English royal residence in London (1530–1698)

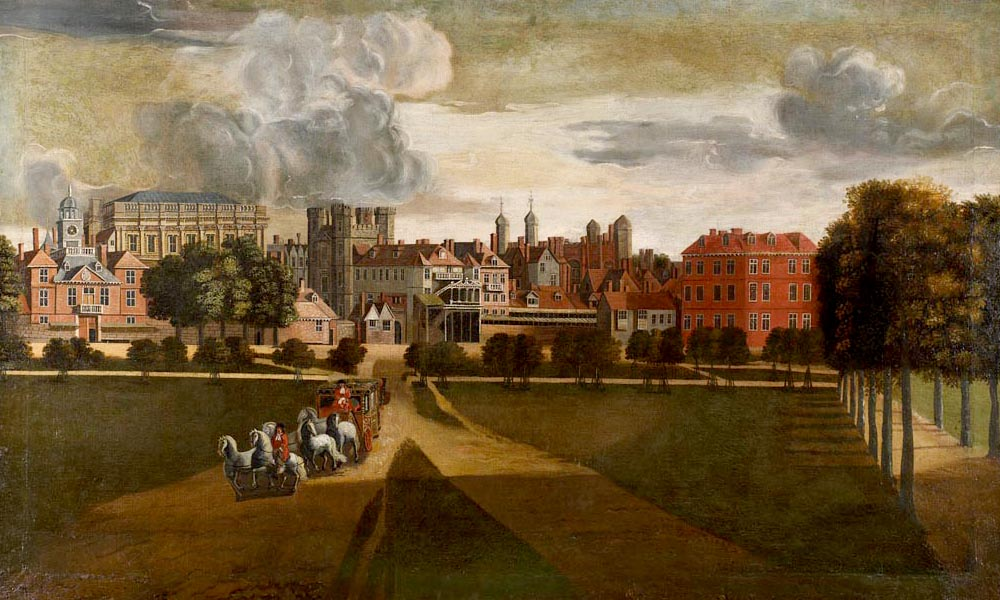
- The Old Palace of Whitehall by Hendrick Danckerts, c. 1675. The view is from the west, in St. James's Park. The Horse Guards barracks are on the extreme left, with the taller Banqueting House behind it. The four-towered building left of centre is the palace gatehouse, the "Holbein Gate".

- Location of the Palace of Whitehall in central London
- 51°30′16″N 00°07′32″W
- Location: City of Westminster, Middlesex, Kingdom of England

History
- Built: c. 1240, 15–17th century
- Demolished: 1698 (due to fire)

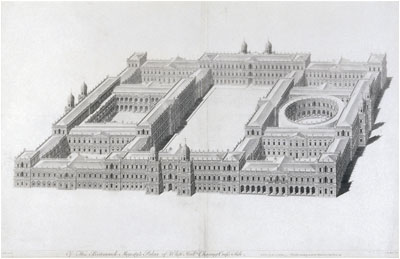
Inigo Jones's plan, dated 1638, for a new palace at Whitehall, which was realised only in part.

The Palace of Whitehall – also spelled White Hall – at Westminster was the main residence of the English monarchs from 1530 until 1698, when most of its structures, with the notable exception of Inigo Jones's Banqueting House of 1622, were destroyed by fire. Henry VIII moved the royal residence to Whitehall after the old royal apartments at the nearby Palace of Westminster were themselves destroyed by fire. Although the Whitehall palace has not survived, the area where it was located is still called Whitehall and has remained a centre of the British government.

Whitehall was at one time the largest palace in Europe, with more than 1,500 rooms, before itself being overtaken by the expanding Palace of Versailles, which was to reach 2,400 rooms. At its most expansive, the palace extended over much of the area bordered by Northumberland Avenue in the north; to Downing Street and nearly to Derby Gate in the south; and from roughly the elevations of the current buildings facing Horse Guards Road in the west, to the then banks of the River Thames in the east (the construction of Victoria Embankment has since reclaimed more land from the Thames)—a total of about 23 acres (9.3 ha). It was about 710 yards (650 m) from Westminster Abbey.

== History ==
By the 13th century, the Palace of Westminster had become the centre of government in England, and had been the main metropolitan residence of the king since 1049. The surrounding area became a popular and expensive location. Walter de Grey, Archbishop of York, bought a nearby property as his Westminster residence soon after 1240, calling it York Place.

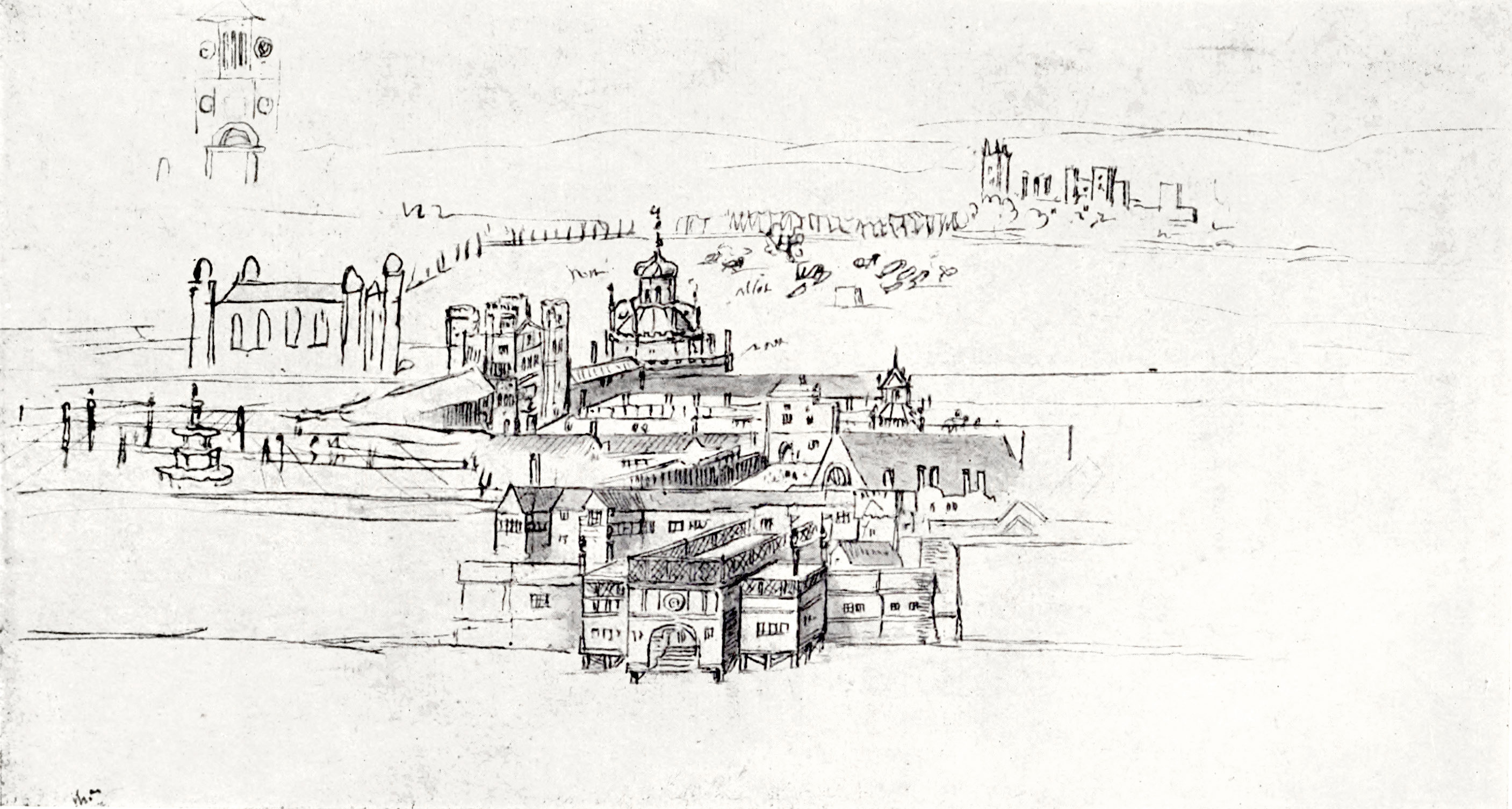
A sketch of Whitehall Palace in 1544, by Anton van den Wyngaerde.

King Edward I stayed at York Place on several occasions while work was carried out at Westminster, and enlarged it to accommodate his entourage. York Place was rebuilt during the 15th century and was expanded so much by Cardinal Wolsey that it was rivalled by only Lambeth Palace as the greatest house in the capital city, the King's palaces included. Consequently, when King Henry VIII removed the cardinal from power in 1530, he acquired York Place to replace Westminster (the royal residential, or 'privy', area of which had been gutted by fire in 1512) as his main residence, inspecting its possessions in the company of Anne Boleyn.

King Henry VIII hired the Flemish artist Anton van den Wyngaerde to redesign York Place, and he extended it during his lifetime. Inspired by Richmond Palace, he included sporting facilities, with a bowling green, indoor real tennis court, a pit for cock fighting (on the site of the Cabinet Office, 70 Whitehall) and a tiltyard for jousting (now the site of Horse Guards Parade). It is estimated that more than £30,000 (several million at present-day value) were spent during the 1540s, half as much again as the construction of the entire Bridewell Palace. Henry VIII decorated his gardens with carved heraldic beasts, including unicorns, set on wooden posts. The posts were painted by the Serjeant Painters Nicholas Lafore and Anthony Toto.

Henry VIII married two of his wives at the palace—Anne Boleyn in 1533 and Jane Seymour in 1536—and died there in January 1547. The body of Elizabeth I was brought by barge from Richmond Palace in March 1603 to lie in state at Whitehall Palace.

Anne of Denmark's secretary William Fowler wrote Latin verses and anagrams for a sundial in the garden, restored by the orders of James VI and I. In 1611, the palace hosted the first known performance of William Shakespeare's play The Tempest. In February 1613 it was the venue for the wedding of Princess Elizabeth and Frederick V of the Palatinate. Anne of Denmark's apartments were painted in "antique work" by John de Critz and the fireplaces carved by Maximilian Colt. A withdrawing chamber for James VI and I featured a wind dial or compass connected to a weather vane on the roof, and the room was painted by John de Critz with a scheme of the four winds, the four corners of the earth, and the four elements.

A courtier, Gerrard Herbert, described entertainments for a French ambassador at Whitehall Palace on 20 May 1619, after Anne of Denmark's death. The Duke of Lennox hosted a feast in King's Great Chamber. A supper of sweetmeats was served in glass bowls brought in on Chinese porcelain platters. The guests moved from the Great Hall to the Queen's Privy Chamber, where they heard the late Queen's French musicians sing, and in the Queen's bedchamber the Irish harp (played by Donell Dubh Ó Cathail), a viol, and Mr Lanier singing and playing on the lute. They returned to the Great Chamber for a performance of Shakespeare's Pericles.

The forty rooms of the lodgings provided for King James's favourite Robert Carr, 1st Earl of Somerset, included a picture gallery in a converted bowling alley. James VI and I made significant changes to the buildings, notably the construction in 1622 of a new Banqueting House built to a design by Inigo Jones to replace a series of previous banqueting houses dating from the time of Elizabeth I. Its decoration was finished in 1634 with the completion of a ceiling by Peter Paul Rubens, commissioned by Charles I (who was to be executed in front of the building in 1649).

By 1650 Whitehall Palace was the largest complex of secular buildings in England, with more than 1,500 rooms. Its layout was irregular, and its constituent parts were of many different sizes and in several different architectural styles, making it look more like a small town than a single building. The irregularity of the buildings was increased by the penchant of courtiers to build onto their assigned lodgings, either at their own expense or that of the king's. Stephen Fox, Charles II's Clerk of the Green Cloth, obtained permission from the Office of Works in the 1660s to build additions to the three rooms he was assigned. By the time he was finished he had constructed a grand mansion with coach house, stables, and a view over the Thames, all within the palace network.

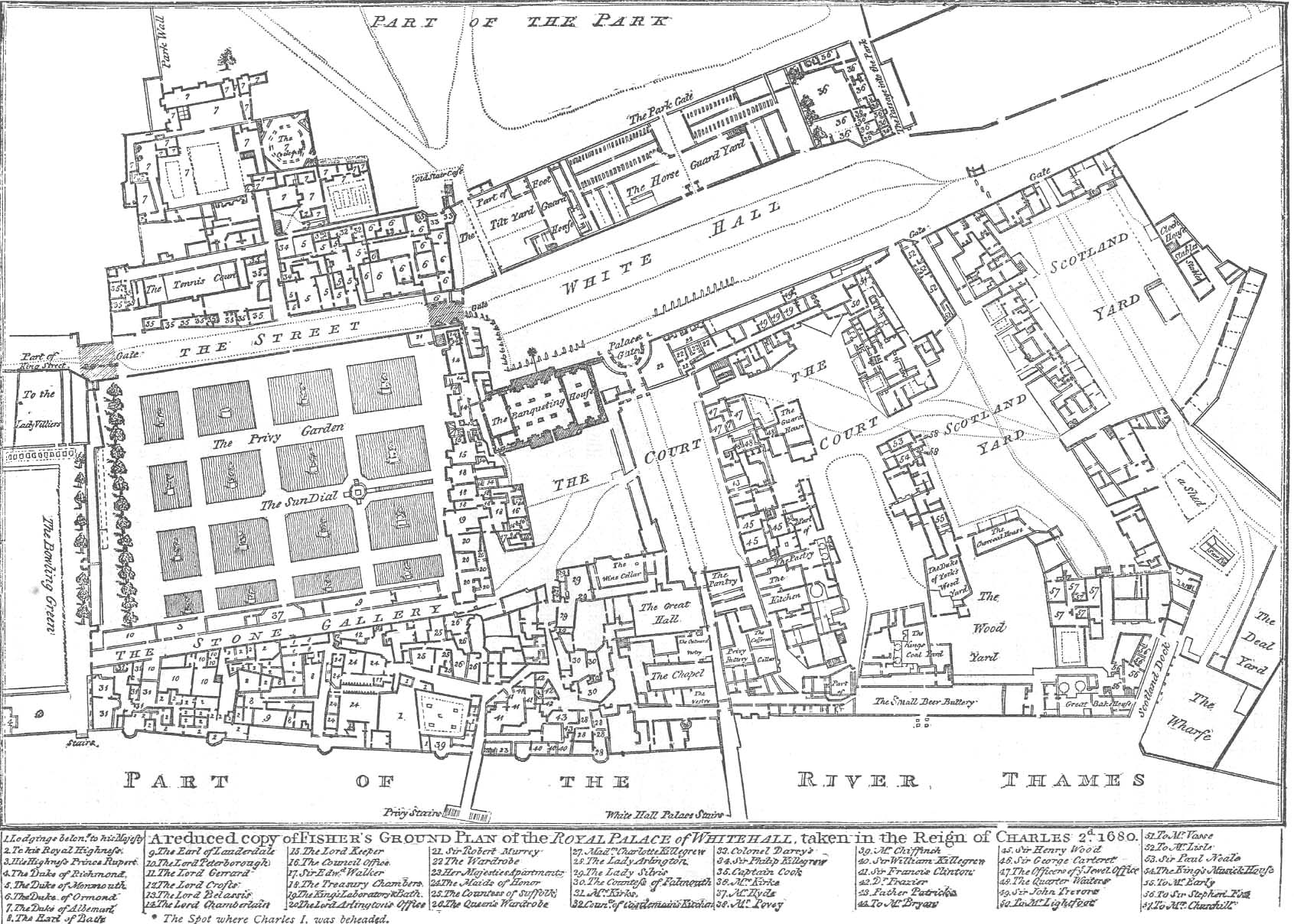
A plan of Whitehall Palace in 1680.

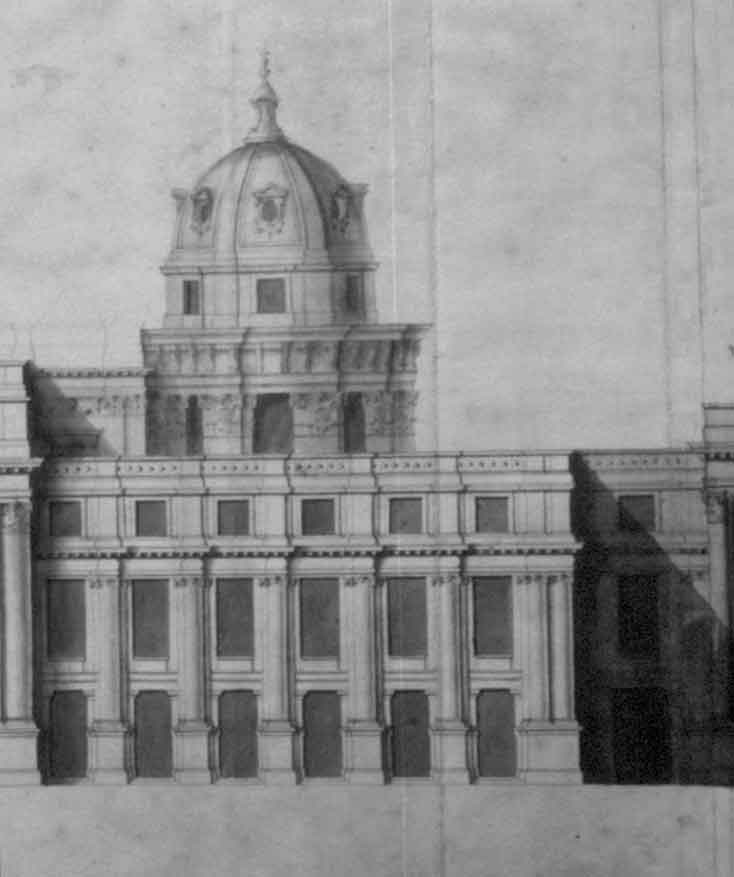
Part of a proposal for the replacement of the palace drawn by Christopher Wren in 1698. The palace was never rebuilt.

Charles II commissioned minor works, but made extensive renovations. Like his father, he died at the palace, but from a stroke. James II ordered various changes by Christopher Wren, including a chapel finished in 1687, rebuilding of the queen's apartments (c. 1688), and the queen's private lodgings (1689). The Roman Catholic chapel of James II, constructed during a period of fierce anti-Catholicism in England, attracted much criticism and also awe when it was completed in December 1686. The ceiling was adorned with 8,132 pieces of gold leaf, and at the east end of the nave an enormous marble altarpiece (40 ft (12 m) high by 25 ft (7.6 m) wide) designed by Wren and carved by Grinling Gibbons dominated the room.

=== Etymology ===
The name 'Whitehall' was first recorded in 1532; it had its origins in the white stone used for the buildings. This stone had been originally brought to England by Wolsey with the hope of establishing a college in Ipswich that would feed Cardinal College, Oxford. However, as part of Wolsey's fall, Henry VIII stole the white stone and other materials intended for the college and co-opted them for the extension of York Place.

== Destruction ==
By 1691 the palace had become the largest and most complex in Europe. On 10 April a fire broke out in the much-renovated apartment previously used by the Duchess of Portsmouth, damaging the older palace structures, though apparently not the state apartments. This actually gave a greater cohesiveness to the remaining complex. At the end of 1694 Mary II died in Kensington Palace of smallpox, and on the following 24 January lay in state at Whitehall; William and Mary had avoided Whitehall in favour of their palace at Kensington.

A second fire on 4 January 1698 destroyed most of the remaining residential and government buildings. It was started inadvertently by a servant in an upper room who had hung wet linen around a burning charcoal brazier to dry. The linen caught fire and the flames quickly spread throughout the palace complex, raging for 15 hours before firefighters could extinguish them. The following day, the wind picked up and re-ignited the fire farther north. Christopher Wren, then the King's Surveyor of Works, was ordered expressly by William III to focus manpower on saving the architectural jewel of the complex, the Banqueting House. Wren ordered bricklayers to block up the main window on the building's south side to block the flames from entering. Around 20 buildings were destroyed to create a firebreak, but this did little to inhibit the westward spread of the flames.

John Evelyn noted succinctly on 5 January: "Whitehall burnt! nothing but walls and ruins left." Besides the Banqueting House, some buildings survived in Scotland Yard and some facing the park, along with the so-called Holbein Gate, eventually demolished in 1769.

During the fire many works of art were destroyed, probably including Michelangelo's Cupid, a famous sculpture bought as part of the Gonzaga collections in the seventeenth century. Also lost were Hans Holbein the Younger's iconic Whitehall Mural, including his Portrait of Henry VIII, and Gian Lorenzo Bernini's marble portrait bust of King Charles I.

== Present day ==
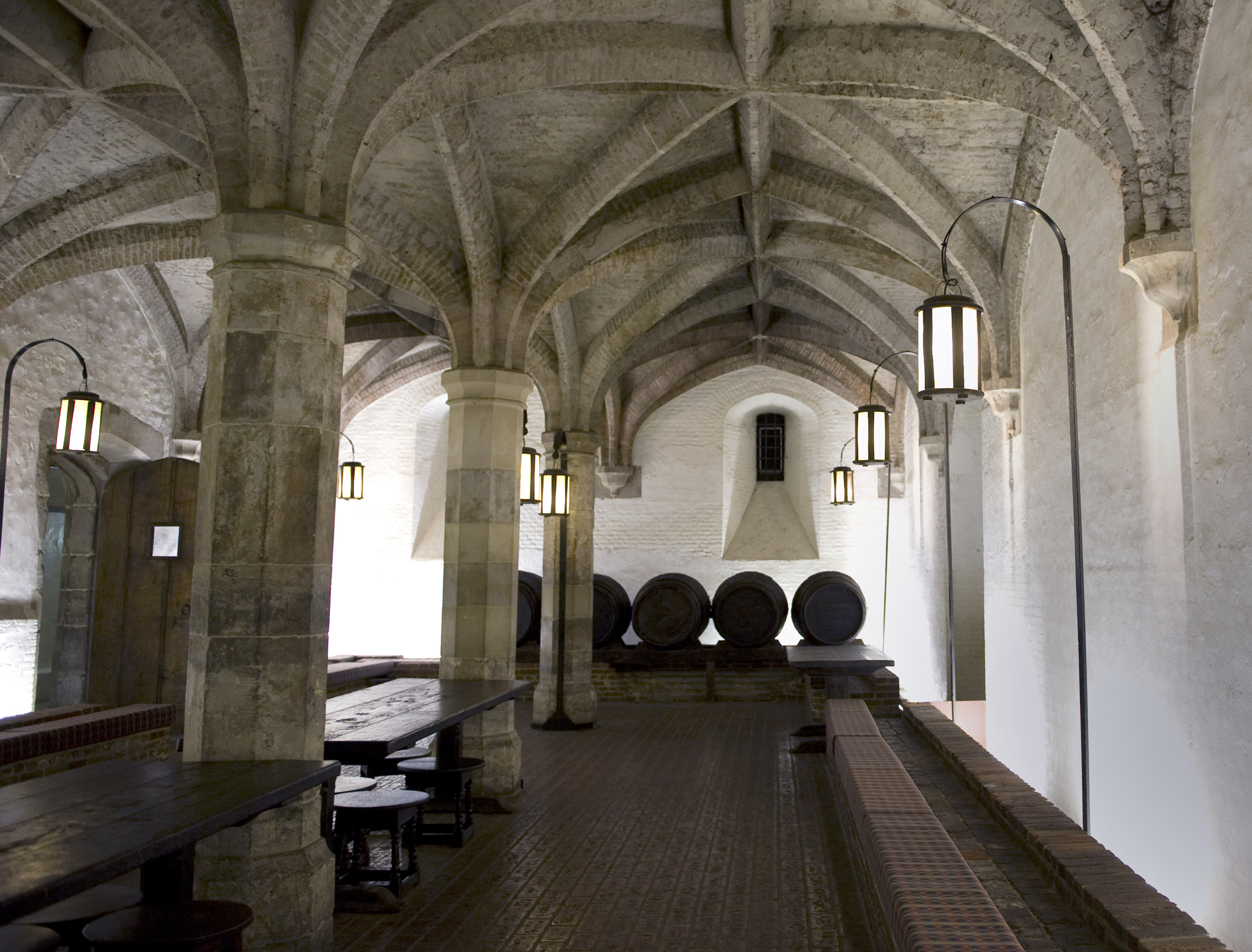
Henry VIII's wine cellar

The Banqueting House is the only integral building of the complex now standing, although it has been somewhat modified. Various other parts of the old palace still exist, often incorporated into new buildings in the Whitehall government complex. These include a tower and other parts of the former covered tennis courts from the time of Henry VIII, built into the Old Treasury and Cabinet Office at 70 Whitehall.

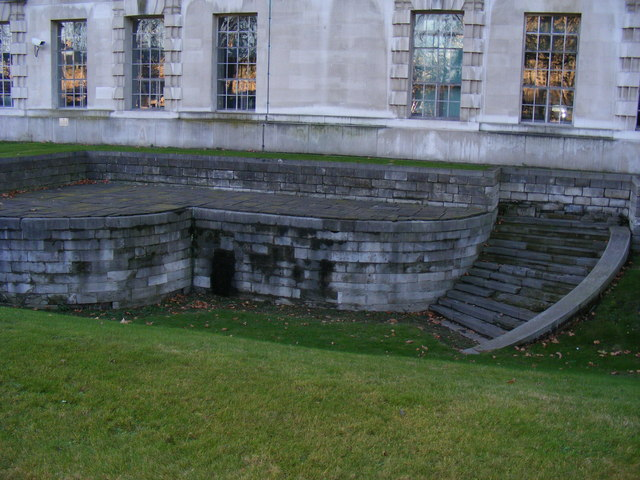
Queen Mary's Steps, Palace of Whitehall

Beginning in 1938, the east side of the site was redeveloped with the building now housing the Ministry of Defence (MOD), now known as the Ministry of Defence Main Building. An undercroft from Wolsey's Great Chamber, now known as Henry VIII's Wine Cellar, a fine example of a Tudor brick-vaulted roof some 70 feet (21 m) long and 30 feet (9 m) wide, was found to interfere not just with the plan for the new building but also with the proposed route for Horse Guards Avenue. Following a request from Queen Mary in 1938 and a promise in Parliament, provision was made for the preservation of the cellar. Accordingly, it was encased in steel and concrete and relocated 9 feet (3 m) to the west and nearly 19 feet (6 m) deeper in 1949, when construction resumed on the site after the Second World War. This was carried out without any significant damage to the structure and it now rests within the basement of the building.

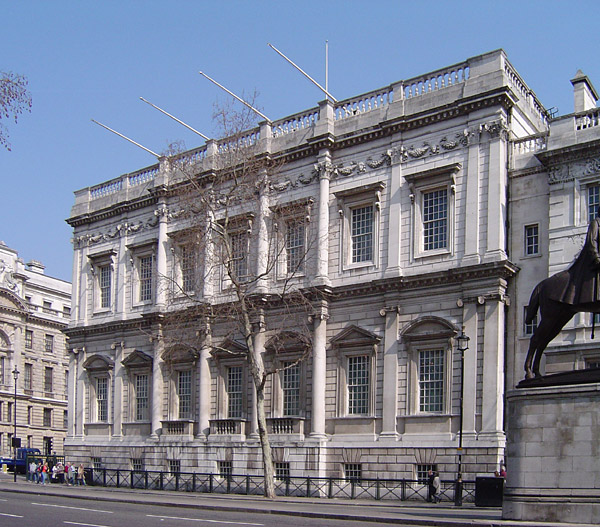
Banqueting House London, the only remaining component of the Palace of Whitehall

A number of marble carvings from the former chapel at Whitehall (which was built for James II) are present in St Andrew's Church, Burnham-on-Sea, in Somerset, to where they were moved in 1820 after having originally been removed to Westminster Abbey in 1706.

== See also ==
- List of demolished buildings and structures in London
- Official royal residences in London:
  - Palace of Westminster – The principal residence of the English kings from 1049 until 1530
  - Kensington Palace – The principal residence of English and later British monarchs between 1689 and 1760
  - St. James's Palace – The principal royal residence from 1702 until 1837, which continues today as the formal palace of the monarchy as the Court of St James's; Clarence House built on the St James's grounds and connected to the palace has been used as the royal London residence during the reigns of William IV (1830–1837) and Charles III (2022–present).
  - Bushy House – future William IV took up residence here in 1797 when appointed Ranger of Bushy Park, and remained through his reign as king (1830–1837)
  - Buckingham Palace – The principal royal residence since 1837
