= Werner Danckert =

German musicologist

Werner Danckert (22 June 1900 – 5 March 1970) was a German folk song researcher.

== Life ==
Born in Erfurt, Danckert trained as a concert pianist after graduating from high school in 1917. He studied musicology with the subsidiary subjects philosophy and physics. In 1923 he received his doctorate in Erlangen (summa cum laude); the habilitation followed at the University of Jena in 1926.

In 1937 Danckert became a member of the NSDAP and professor at the Musikhochschule Weimar. Danckert became a member of the Hauptstelle Musik at the Amt Rosenberg. At the Reichsmusiktage in Düsseldorf (1938). Danckert gave a lecture on Volkstum, Stammesart, Rasse im Lichte der Volkstumsforschung. In 1939 he published the book Die ältesten Spuren germanischer Volksmusik. In 1943 he was given a chair in Graz and an apl. professorship in Berlin as successor of Herbert Birtner.

After the end of the Second World War he did not return to any university, but published further books on folk music and other musical topics.

Danckert died in Krefeld at age 69.

== Publications ==
- Geschichte der Gigue, Leipzig 1924
- Ursymbole melodischer Gestaltung, Kassel 1932
- Beiträge zur Bachkritik, Kassel 1934
- Grundriss der Volksliedkunde, Berlin 1939
- Das Europäische Volkslied, Berlin 1939, dto, 2. improved and extended edition Bonn 1970
- Claude Debussy, Berlin 1950
- Goethe, der mystische Urgrund seiner Weltschau, Berlin 1951
- Offenes und geschlossenes Leben, zwei Daseinsaspekte in Goethes Weltschau, Bonn 1963
- Unehrliche Leute. Die verfemten Berufe, Bern and Munich 1963
- Das Volkslied im Abendland, Bern and Munich 1960
- Tonreich und Symbolzahl in Hochkulturen und Primitivenwelt, Bonn 1966
- Symbol, Metapher und Allegorie im Lied der Völker, four volumes, issued from the estate of Hannelore Vogel, Bonn-Bad Godesberg 1976–78
- Musik und Weltbild,

=== Discontinued volumes ===
- Bach und Händel
- Musik und Musikstile Polynesiens
- Studien zur Vor- und Frühgeschichte ostasiatischer Musik
- Musik im indopazifischen Raum
- Musikwissenschaft und Kulturkreislehre
