= Hendrick Danckerts =

Dutch Golden Age painter and engraver

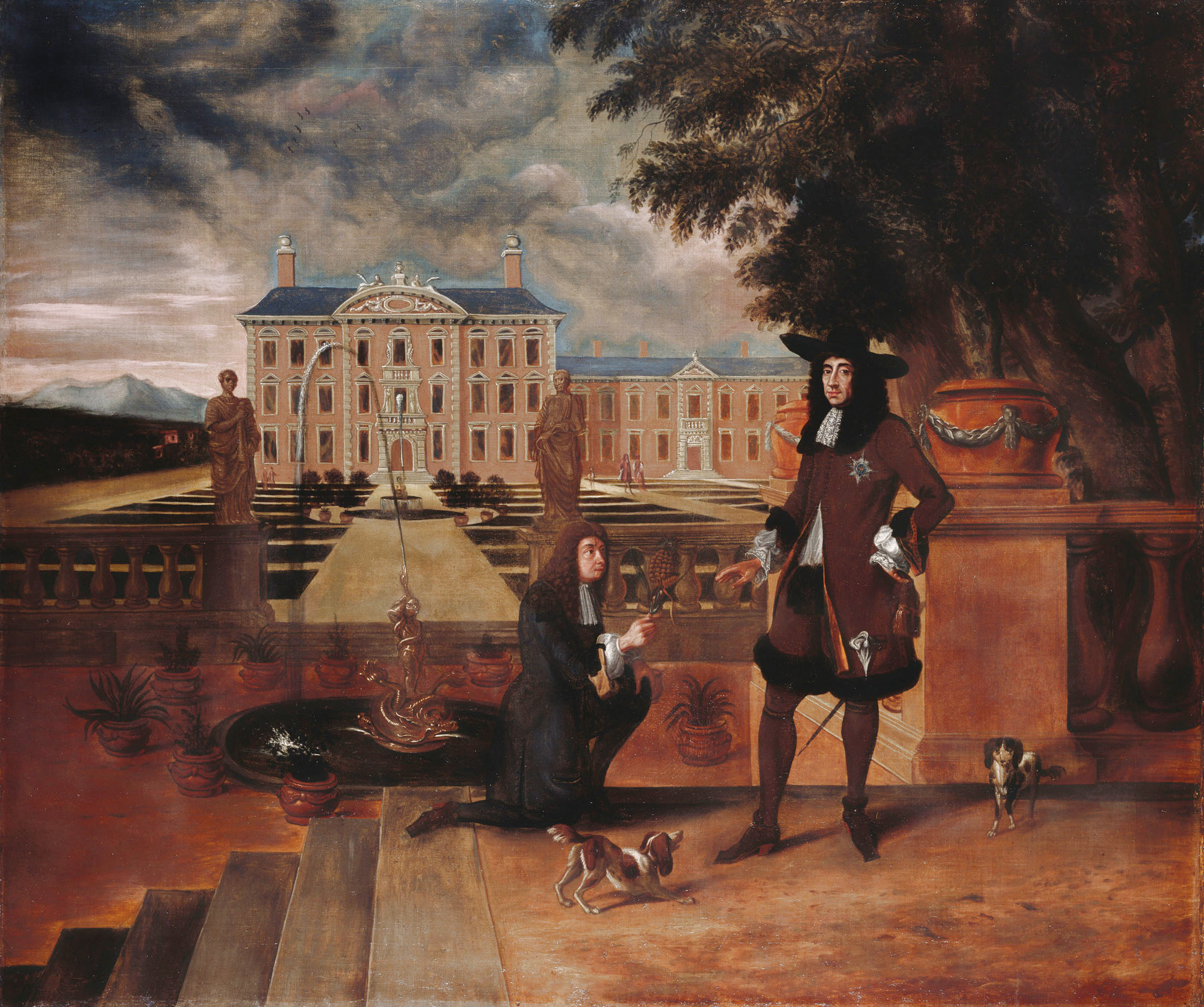
Hendrick Danckerts, Charles II Presented with a Pineapple, 1675

Hendrick Danckerts (c. 1625 – 1680) was a Dutch Golden Age painter and engraver, mostly of houses in their landscape settings. After some years in Italy, he spent most of his career in London, working for Charles II and his brother.

== Biography ==
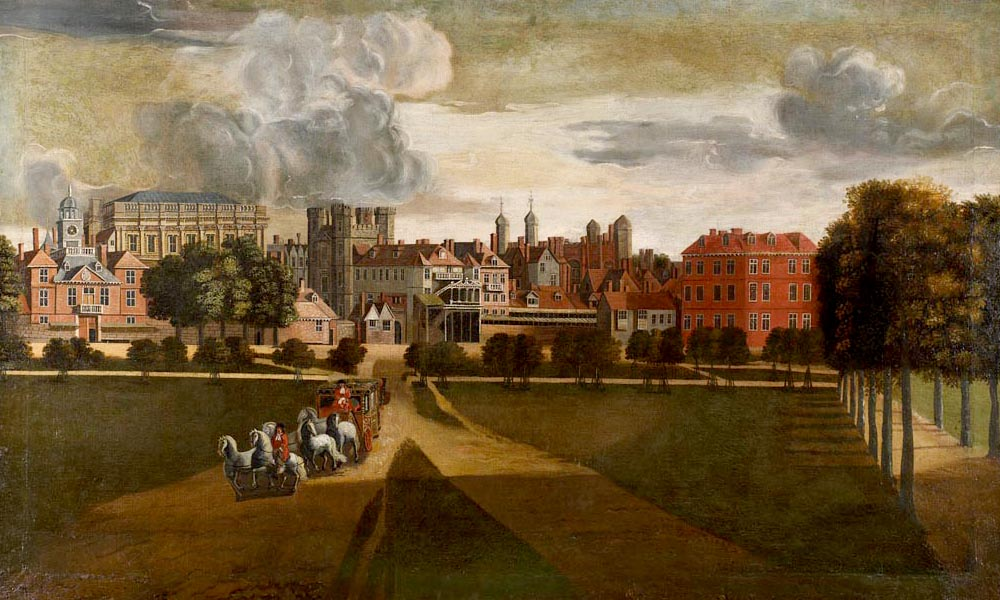
The Old Palace of Whitehall

Danckerts was born in The Hague, where he learned his trade and remained until 1653. He visited England for the first time in 1650. In 1653 he went to Italy, where he stayed for five years. He then moved to England where he entered the service of Charles II and the Duke of York (later James II & VII.) He painted Italianate landscapes, especially views of harbours and royal residences. He also produced portraits and devotional pictures and made engravings after the Italian old masters in the Royal Collection. He left England in 1679 due to the public hostility towards Roman Catholics after the Popish Plot controversy. He died soon after in Amsterdam, and was buried on 2 November 1680.

He was also known as the "Master with the two Anchors" and was the younger brother of the painter Johan Danckerts. Danckerts has twenty paintings in public ownership in the United Kingdom.

== Gallery ==
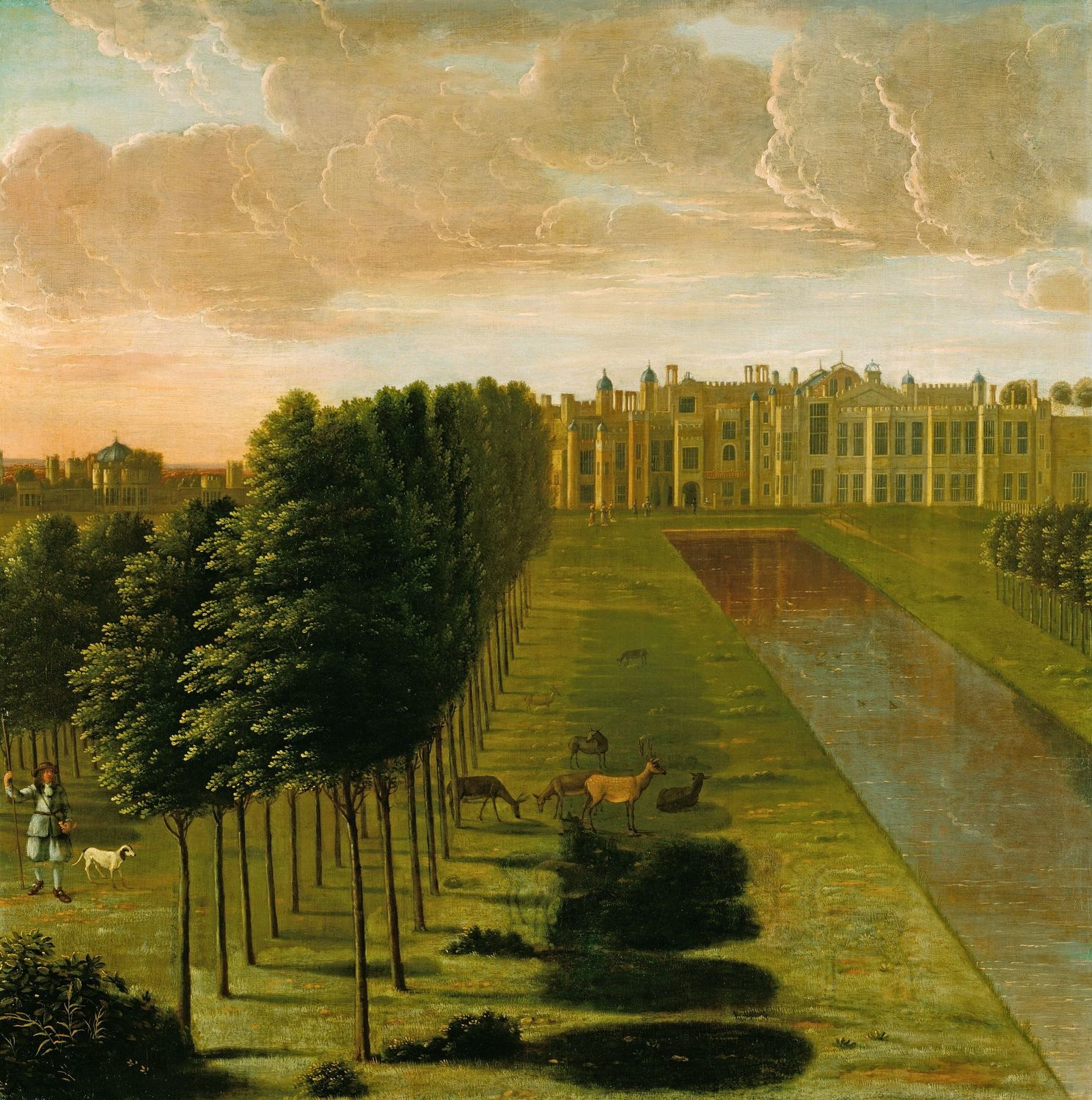
Hampton Court Palace, c.1666

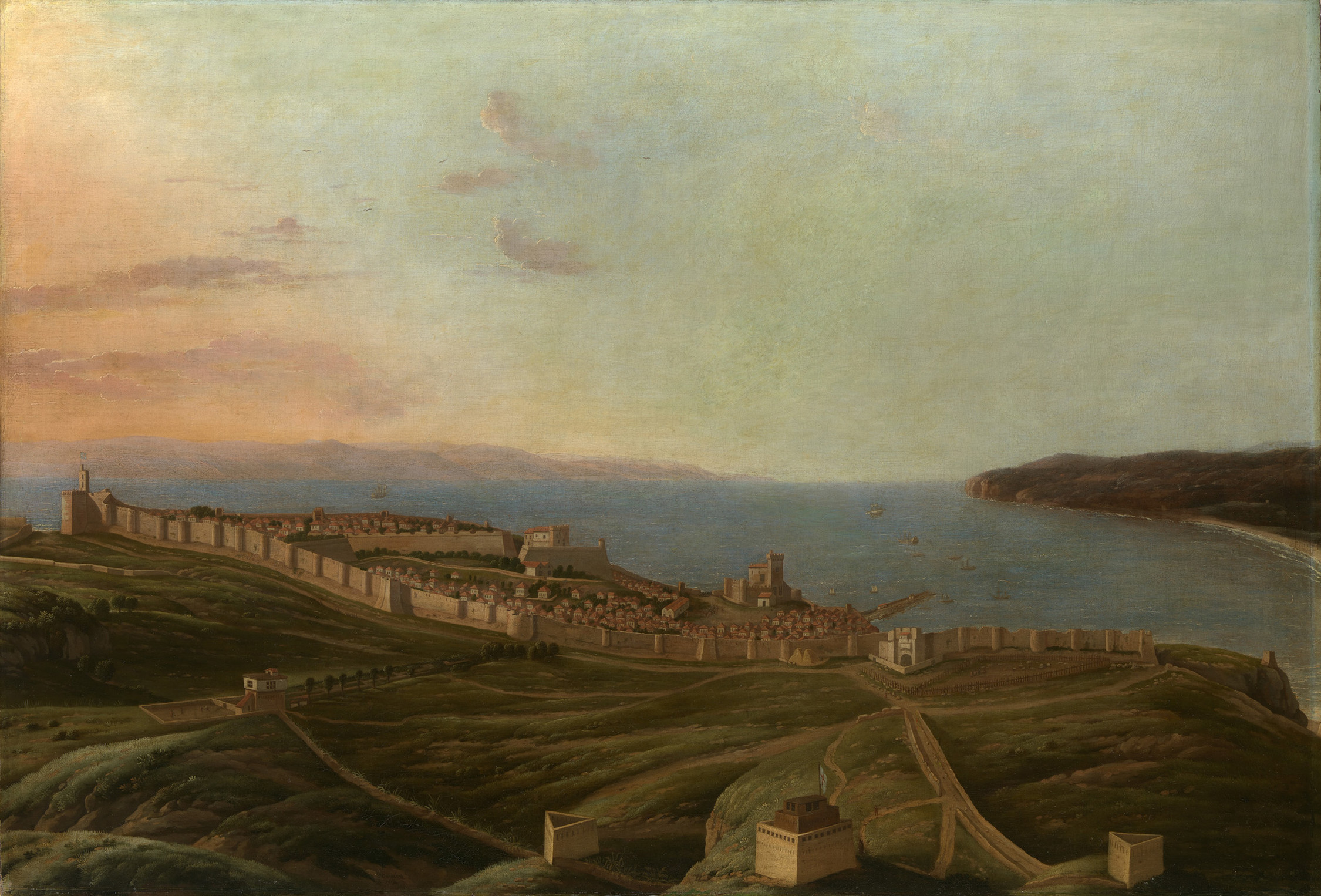
A View of Tangier, 1669

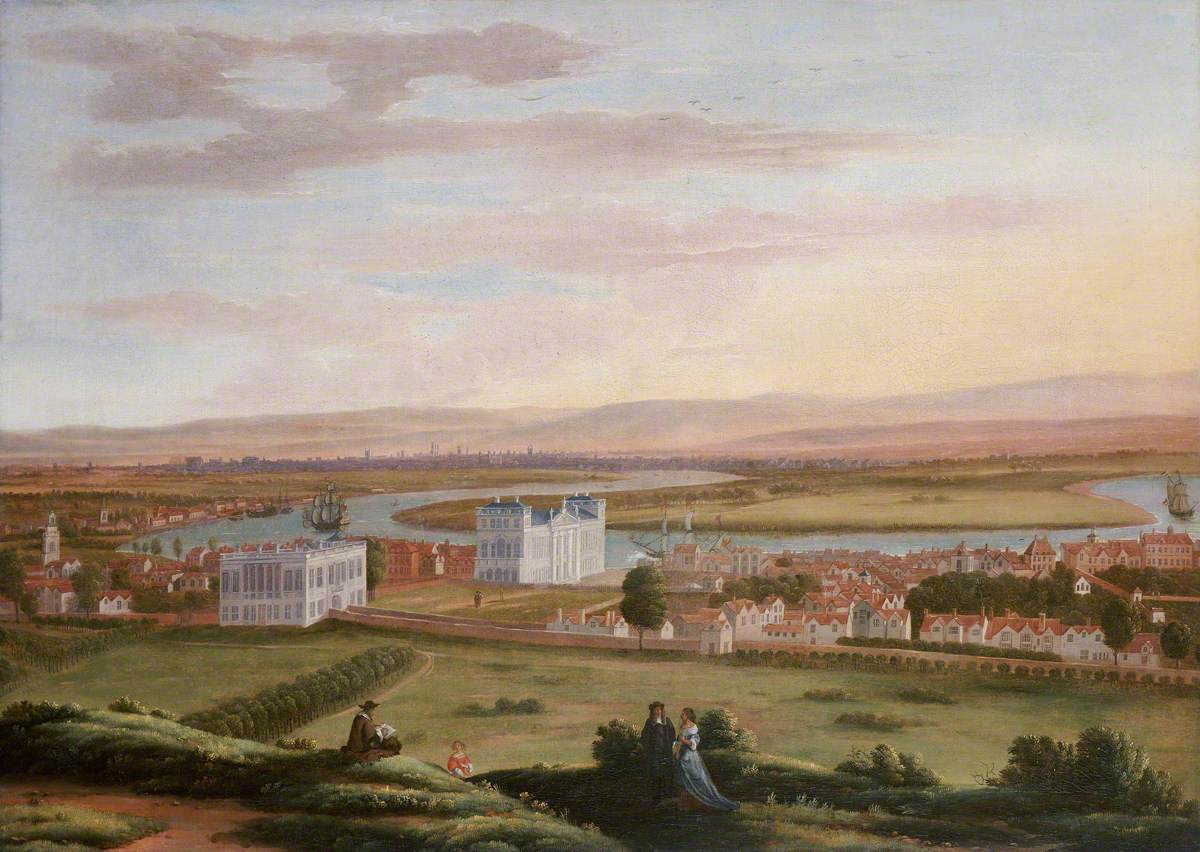
View of Greenwich and the Queen's House, c.1670

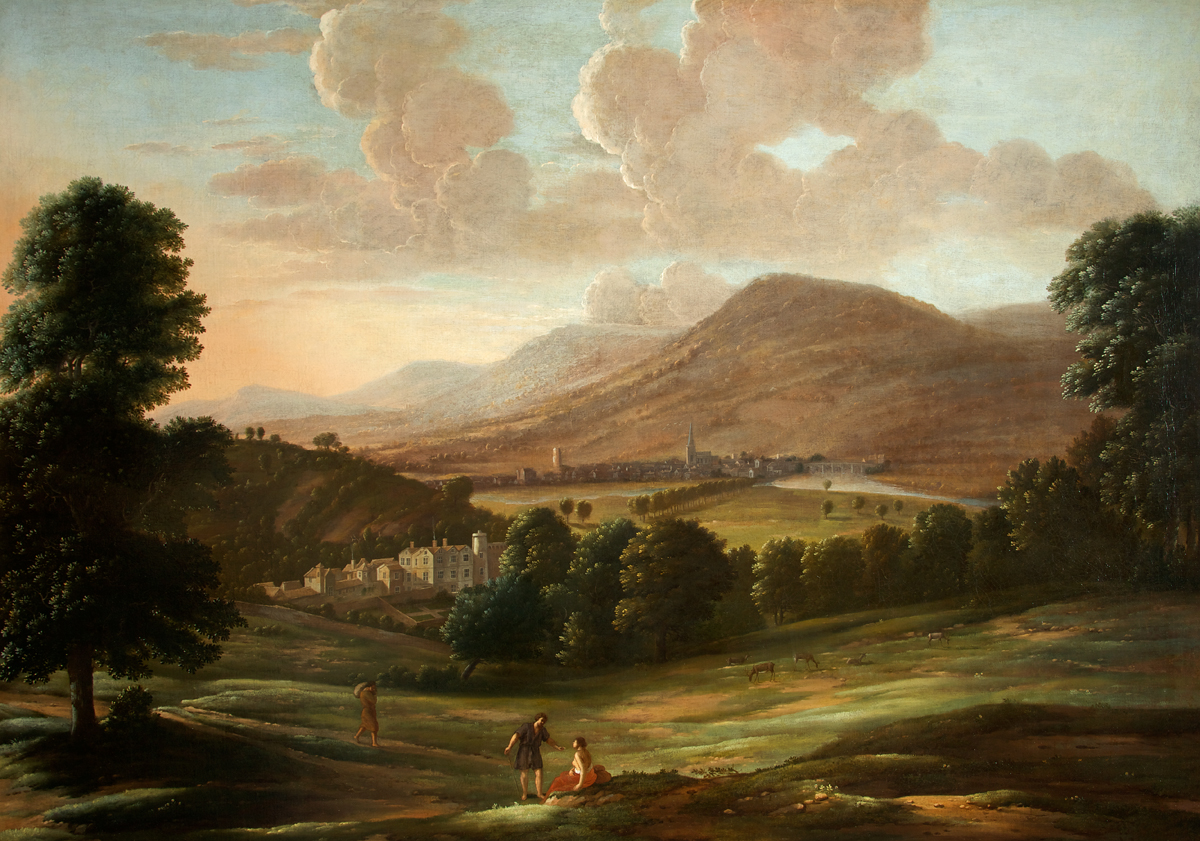
A Panorama of Monmouth with Troy House, 1672

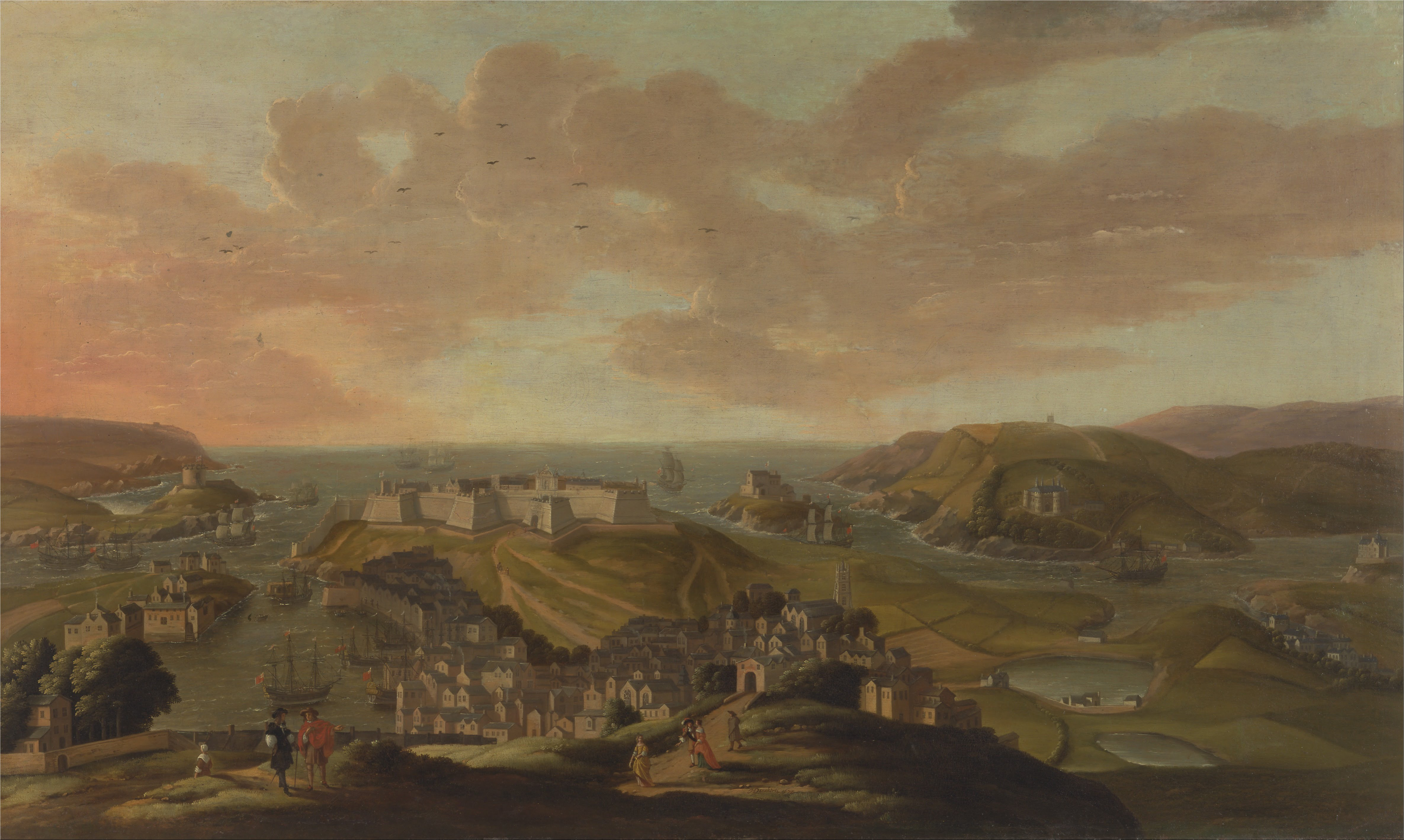
Plymouth, 1673

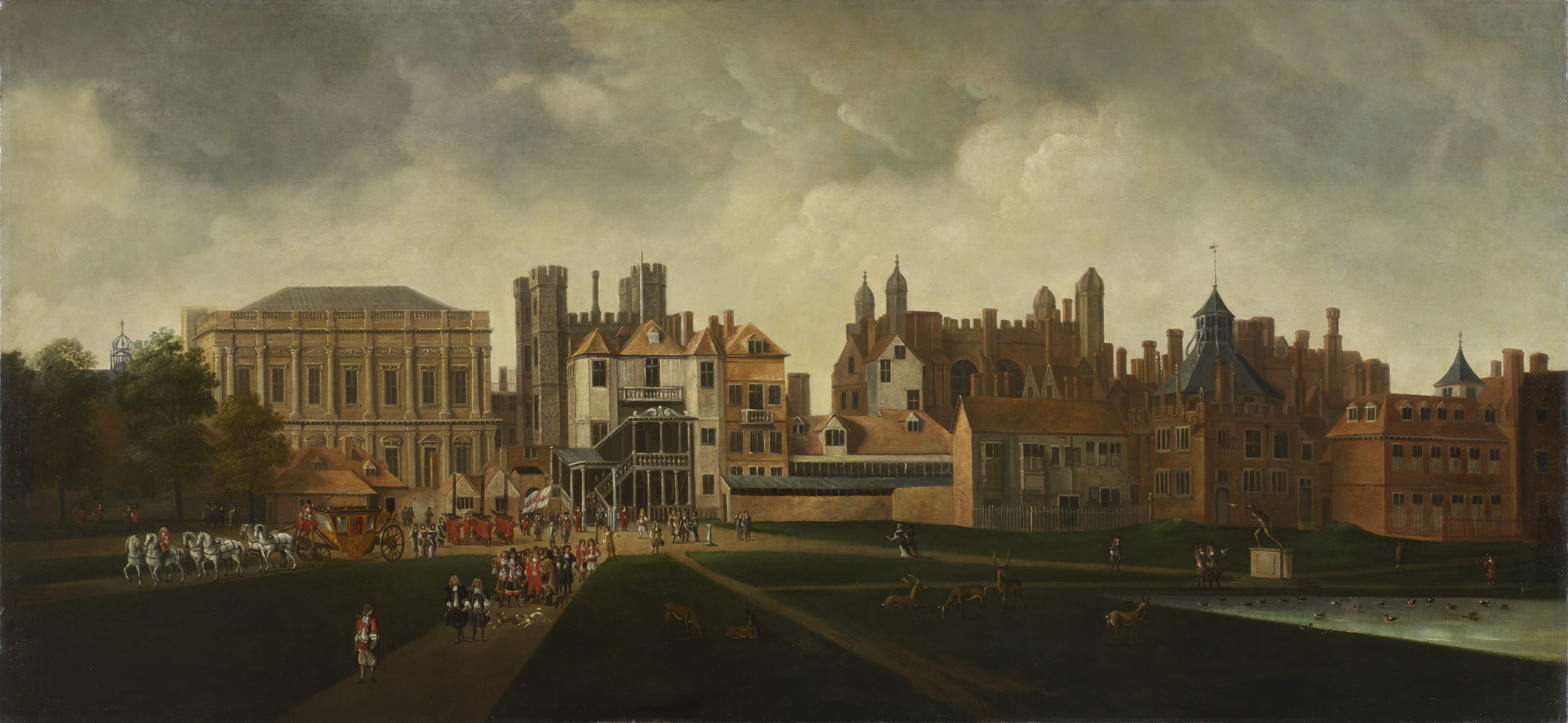
Palace of Whitehall from St James's Park, c.1675

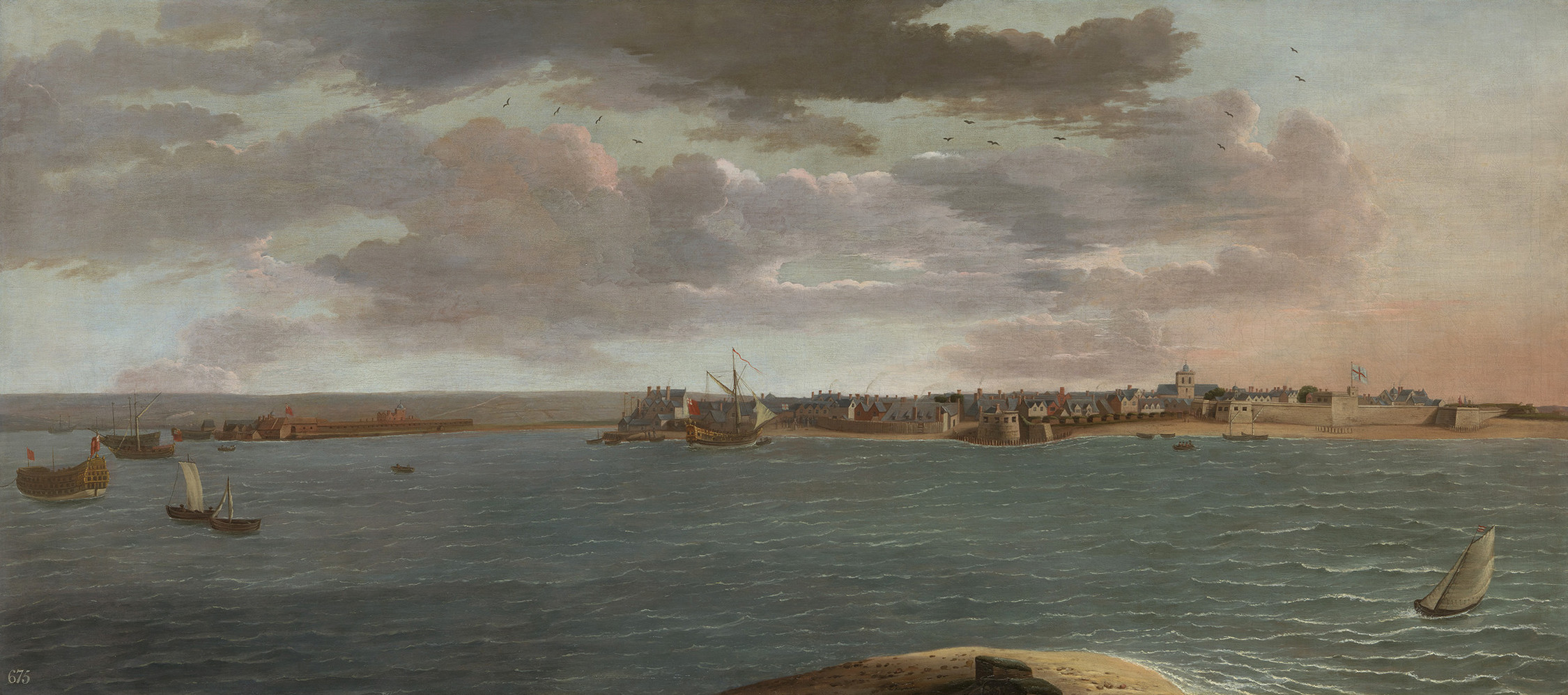
A View of Portsmouth, 1675

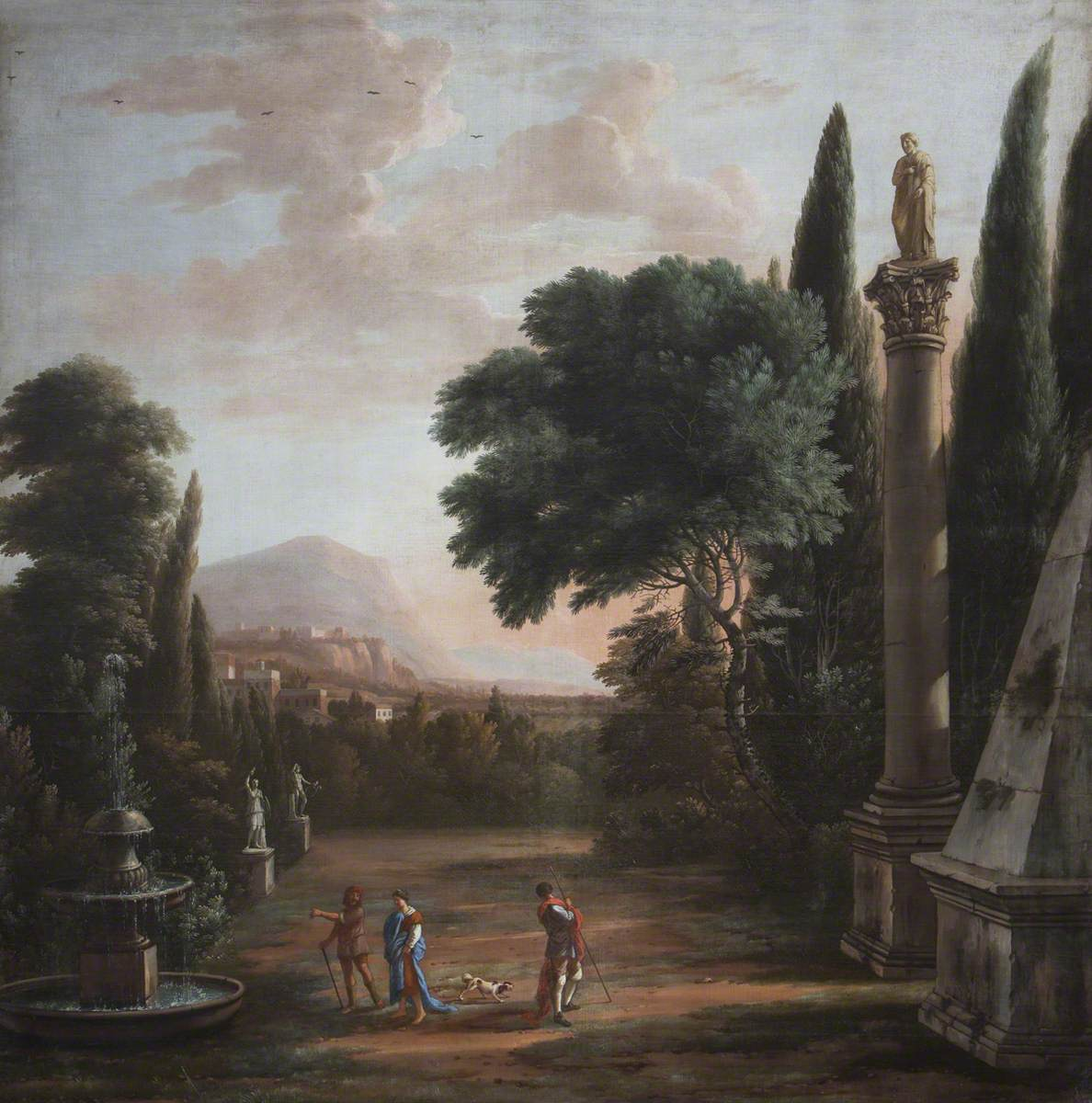
Figures in a Classical Garden, 1675

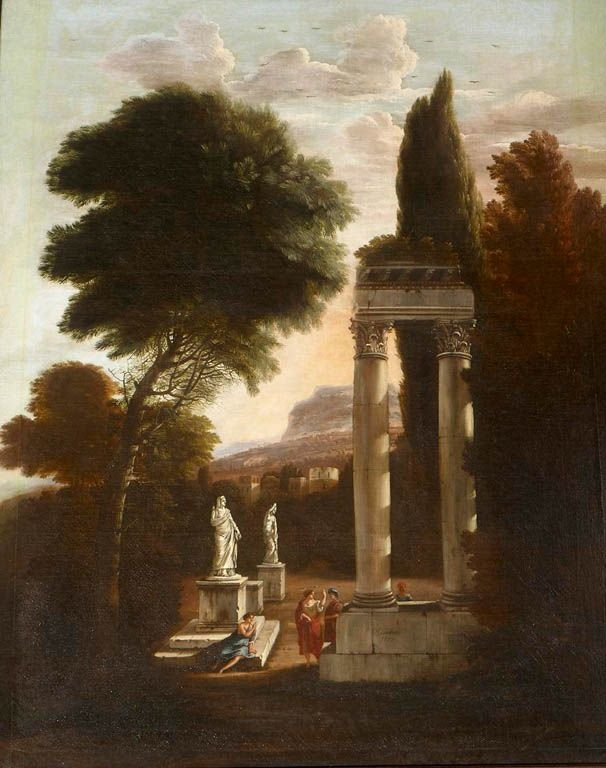
Classical Landscape, 1677

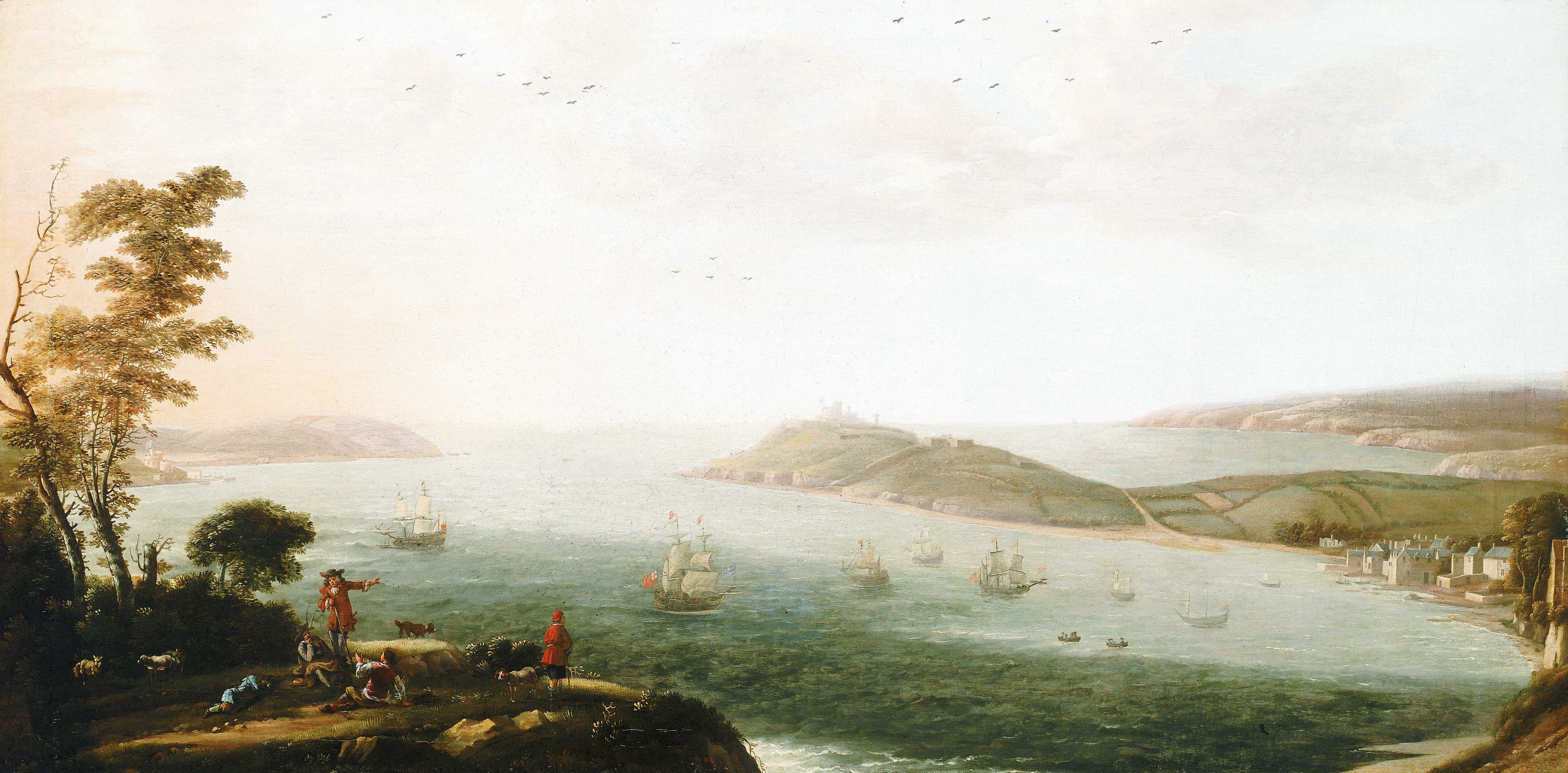
A View of Falmouth Harbour, 1678

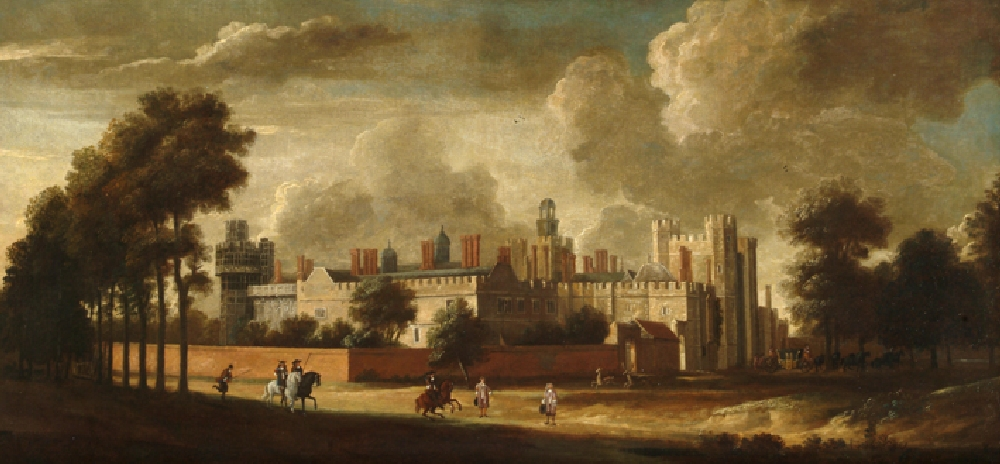
Nonsuch Palace from the North East
