= Habsburg Spain =

Period of Spanish history (1516–1700)

Monarchy of Spain (Note: Also known as Kingdom of Spain (Old Spanish: Reyno de España (often also spelled, Eſpana, Eſpaña or Eſpanna), Modern Spanish: Reino de España).) Monarquía de España
- 1516–1700
- Cross of Burgundy (since c. 1525); State flag (1506-1700) Coat of arms of Habsburg Spain (1668–1700)
- Anthem: Marcha Real (Spanish) "Royal March"
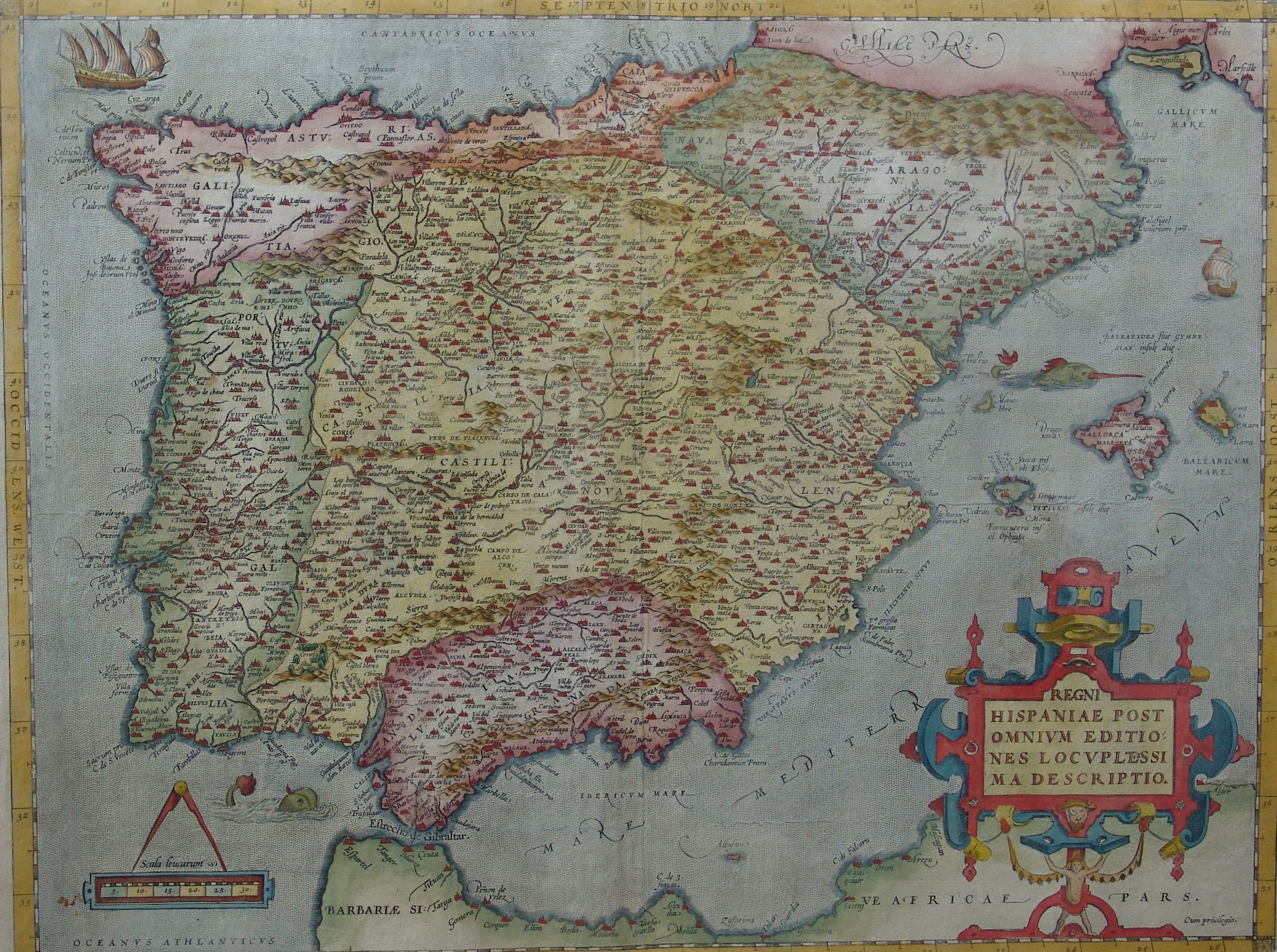
- 1570 map of the Iberian Peninsula
- Capital: Madrid (1561–1601; 1606–1700); Valladolid (1601–1606)
- Official languages: Spanish
- Religion: Catholicism
- Demonyms: Spaniard, Spanish
- Government: Composite monarchy
- Monarch
  - 1516–1556 (first): Charles I
  - 1665–1700 (last): Charles II
- Legislature: Cortes of Castile; Cortz of Aragon; Corts of Catalonia; Corts of Valencia; Cortes of Navarre; Cortes of Portugal
- Historical era: Early modern period
  - Ascension of Charles I: 23 January 1516
  - Dutch Revolt: 1568–1648
  - Iberian Union: 1580–1640
  - Franco-Spanish War: 1635–1659
  - Portuguese Restoration War: 1640–1668
  - Death of Charles II: 1 November 1700
- Currency: Spanish real and others
Preceded by
Crown of Castile
Crown of Aragon
Succeeded by
Kingdom of Spain
Dutch Republic
Kingdom of Sardinia
Iberian Union
Knights Hospitaller
- Today part of: Spain

Habsburg Spain, (Note: Contemporary historiographical term.) also known as the Catholic Monarchy, was the period of Spanish history and Spanish Empire from 1516 to 1700 when it was ruled by kings from the House of Habsburg. In this period the Spanish Empire was at the zenith of its power and influence. During this period, Spain held many territories, including Pan-American continental holdings and the West Indies; European territories like the Low Countries, Italian territories, Portugal and parts of France; and the Philippines and other possessions in Southeast Asia. The period of Spanish history has also been referred to as the "Age of Expansion".

The Habsburg name was not always used by the family members, who often emphasized their more prestigious princely titles. The dynasty was long known as the "House of Austria". Calling this era "Habsburg", is, to some extent, a convenience for historians.

The marriage of Isabella I of Castile and Ferdinand II of Aragon in 1469 united the two main crowns, Castile and Aragon, which eventually led to the de facto unification of Spain after the culmination of the Reconquista with the conquest of Granada in 1492 and of Navarre from 1512 to 1529. Isabella and Ferdinand were given the title of "Catholic Monarchs of Spain" by Pope Alexander VI in 1494. With the Habsburgs, the term Monarchia Catholica (Catholic Monarchy, Modern Spanish: Monarquía Católica) remained in use. Spain remained one of the greatest political and military powers in Europe and the world for much of the 16th and 17th centuries. The Habsburg period ushered in the Spanish Golden Age of arts and literature, producing some of the world's most influential writers, painters, and intellectuals, including Teresa of Ávila, Pedro Calderón de la Barca, Miguel de Cervantes, Francisco de Quevedo, Diego Velázquez, El Greco, Domingo de Soto, Francisco Suárez and Francisco de Vitoria. The death of Charles II, the last Habsburg king of Spain, in 1700, led to the War of the Spanish Succession and the ascension of Philip V of the Bourbon dynasty.

== History ==
Arms of Charles I, representing his territories in Spain (top) and his other European possessions (bottom)

=== Beginnings of the empire (1504–1521) ===
In 1504, Queen Isabella I of Castile died. Though her widower, King Ferdinand II of Aragon, tried to maintain rule over Castile, the crown passed to his and Isabella's daughter Joanna. Her husband, Philip, was the Habsburg son of Emperor Maximilian I and Duchess Mary of Burgundy. Shortly thereafter Joanna began to lapse into insanity, although the extent of her mental illness remains the topic of some debate. In 1506, Philip I was declared jure uxoris king, but he died later that year under mysterious circumstances, possibly poisoned by his father-in-law, Ferdinand II. (Note: Biography of Juana, xs4all.nl) Since their oldest son, Charles, was only six, the Cortes Generales reluctantly allowed Ferdinand to rule the country as regent in Joanna's name.

As undisputed ruler in most of the Peninsula, Ferdinand adopted a more aggressive policy than he had as Isabella's husband, escalating his longstanding designs on Navarre into a full-blown invasion, initially led by a Castilian military expedition and later supported by Aragonese troops (1512).

He also attempted to enlarge Spain's sphere of influence in Italy to strengthen it against France. As ruler of Aragon, Ferdinand had fought France and Venice for control of Italy. These conflicts became the center of Ferdinand's foreign policy as king. In the War of the League of Cambrai against Venice, Spanish soldiers distinguished themselves on the field alongside their French allies at the Battle of Agnadello (1509). A year later, Ferdinand joined the Holy League against France, seeing a chance at taking both Naples and Navarre, which he claimed by blood and marriage respectively. The war was less successful than the one against Venice, and a truce in 1516 gave Milan to France and recognized Spanish hegemony in northern Navarre.

Ferdinand's death later that year led to the ascension of young Charles to both Spanish thrones, further solidifying the monarchy of Spain. His inheritance included all the Spanish possessions in the New World and around the Mediterranean. Upon the death of his Habsburg father in 1506, Charles had inherited the Habsburg Netherlands and Franche-Comté, growing up in Flanders. In 1519, with the death of his paternal grandfather, Emperor Maximilian, Charles inherited the Habsburg territories in Germany, and was duly elected as Holy Roman emperor that year. Joanna remained queen of Castile until her death in 1555, but due to her mental health and worries of her being proposed as an alternative monarch by opposition (as happened in the Revolt of the Comuneros), Charles kept her imprisoned.

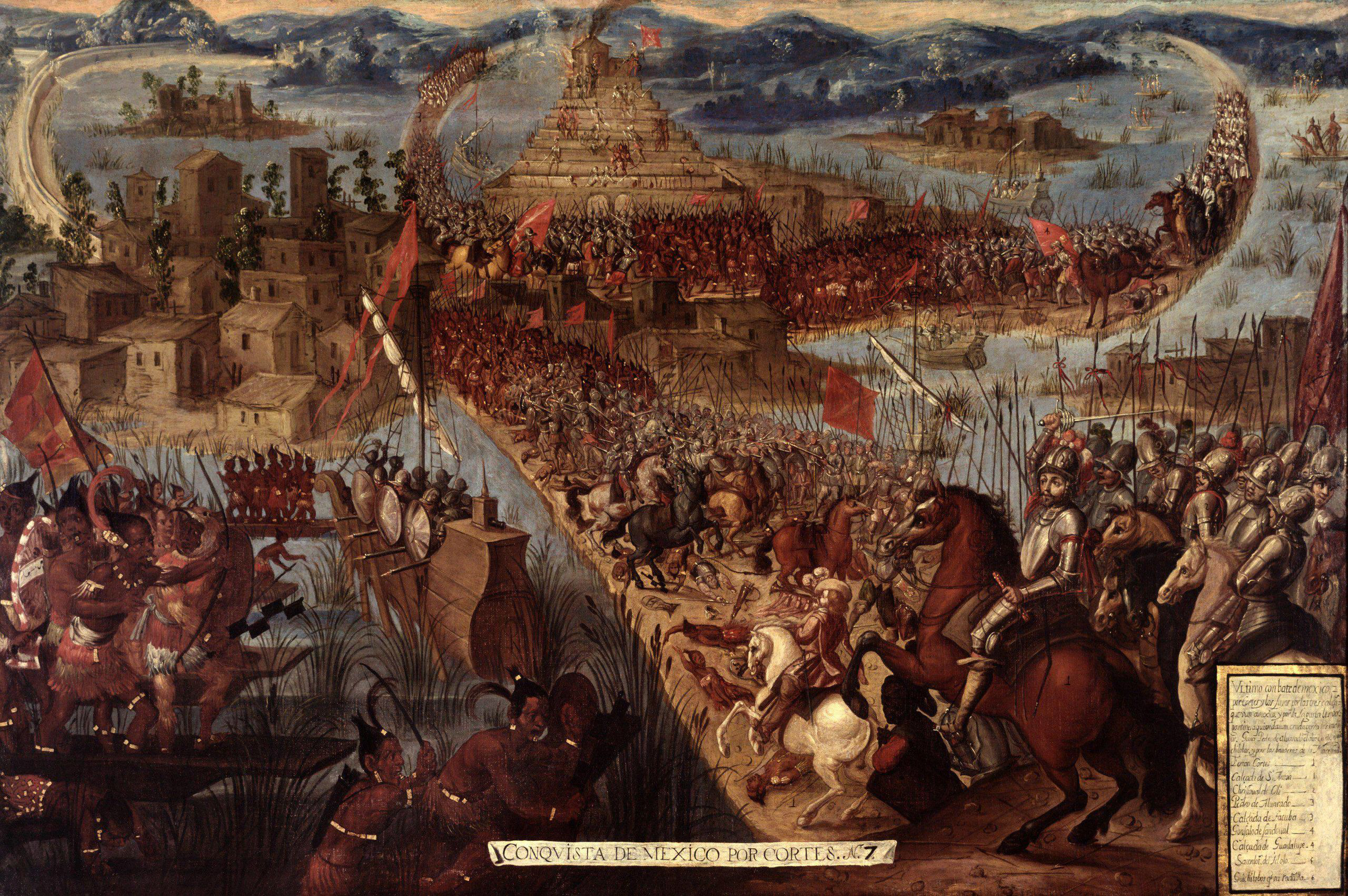
17th century painting depicting the 1521 Fall of Tenochtitlan. Spanish colonists were led to invade the Aztec Empire by conquistador Hernán Cortés.

At that point, Emperor and King Charles was the most powerful man in Christendom. The accumulation of so much power by one man and one dynasty greatly concerned King Francis I of France, now surrounded by Habsburg territories. In 1521 Francis invaded the Spanish possessions in Italy and Navarre, inaugurating a second round of Franco-Spanish conflict. The war was a disaster for France, which suffered defeats at Biccoca (1522), Pavia (1525, at which Francis was captured), and Landriano (1529) before Francis ceded Milan to Spain once more.

Spain's overseas possessions in the New World were based in the Caribbean and the Spanish Main. They consisted of a rapidly decreasing indigenous population, few resources of value to the crown, and a sparse Spanish settler population. The situation changed dramatically with the expedition of Hernán Cortés, who conquered the Aztec Empire in 1521 by allying with indigenous rivals of the Aztecs alongside thousands of native warriors. Following the pattern established during the Reconquista and in the Caribbean, the first European settlements in the Americas, were created by conquerors who divided up the indigenous population into private holdings, encomiendas, and exploited their labor. With America's colonization, Spain gained vast new indigenous populations to convert to Christianity and rule as vassals of the crown. Charles established the Council of the Indies in 1524 to oversee all of Castile's overseas possessions. Charles appointed a viceroy in Mexico in 1535, capping the royal governance of the high court, Real Audiencia, and treasury officials with the highest royal official. Officials were under the jurisdiction of the Council of the Indies. Charles promulgated the New Laws of 1542 to limit the power of the Conquistadors to form a hereditary aristocracy that might challenge the power of the crown.

=== Charles, an emperor and a king (1521–1558) ===
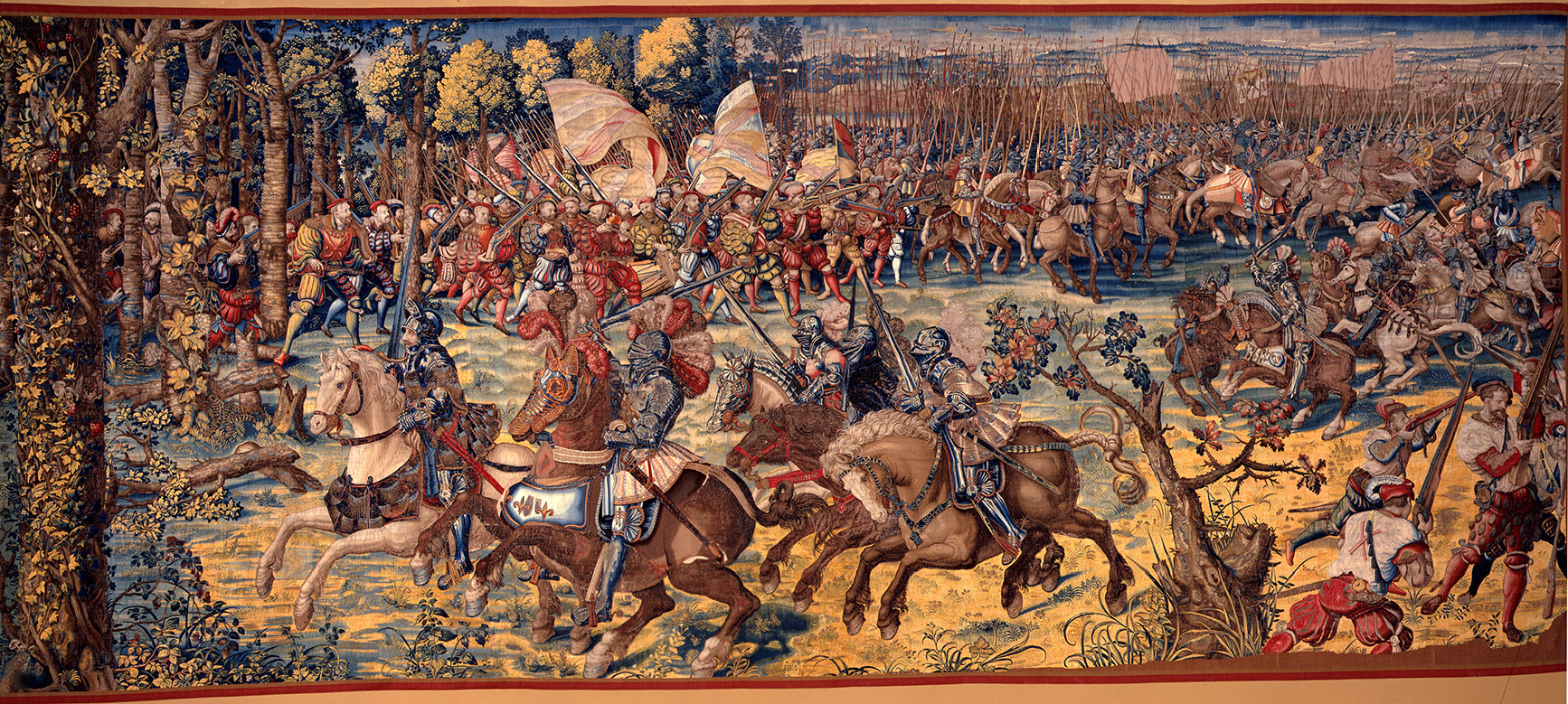
Detail of a tapestry depicting the Battle of Pavia with heavy cavalry and Landsknecht mercenaries armed with arquebuses.

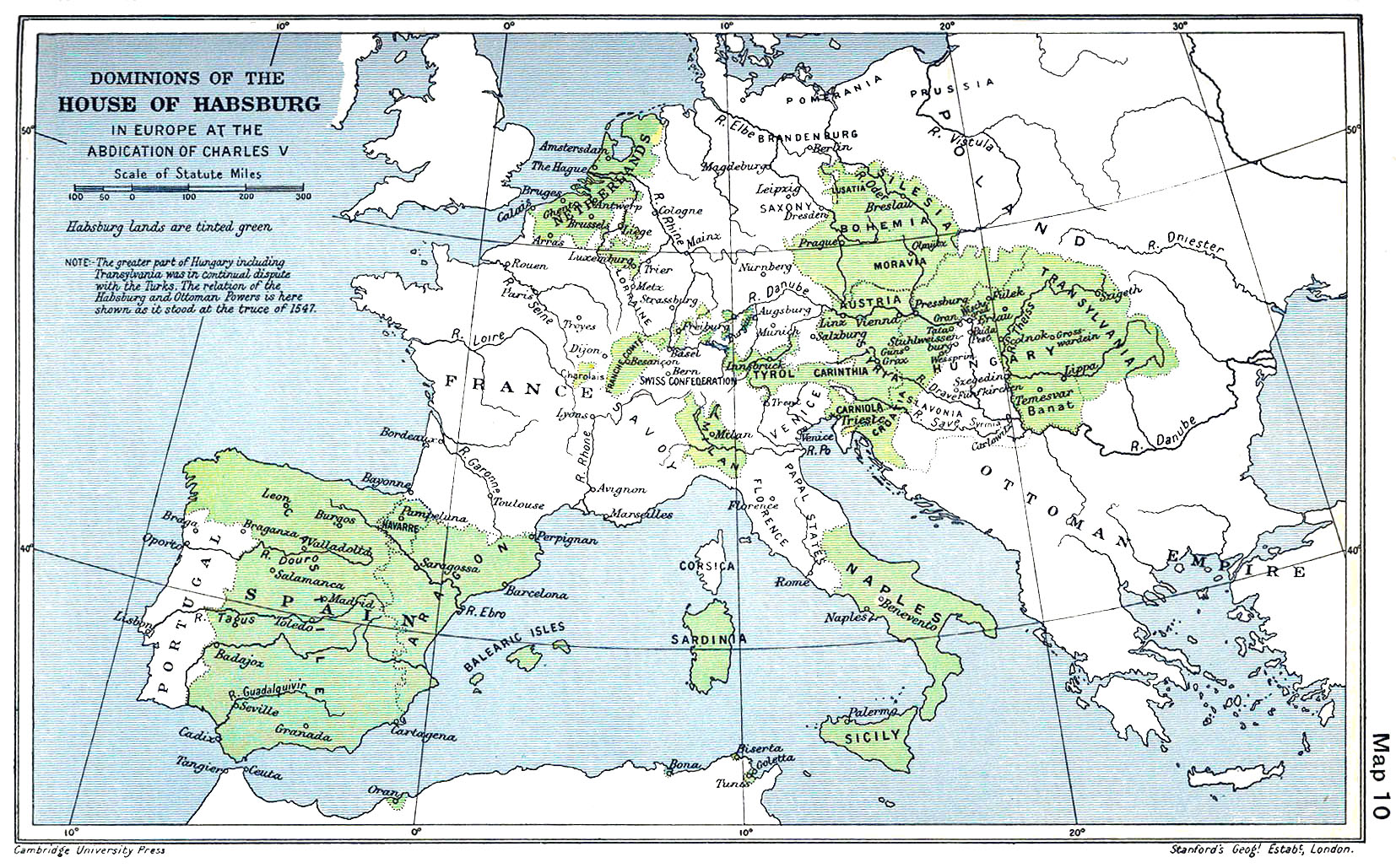
A map of the dominion of the Habsburg monarchy following the Battle of Mühlberg (1547) as depicted in The Cambridge Modern History Atlas (1912); Habsburg lands are shaded green

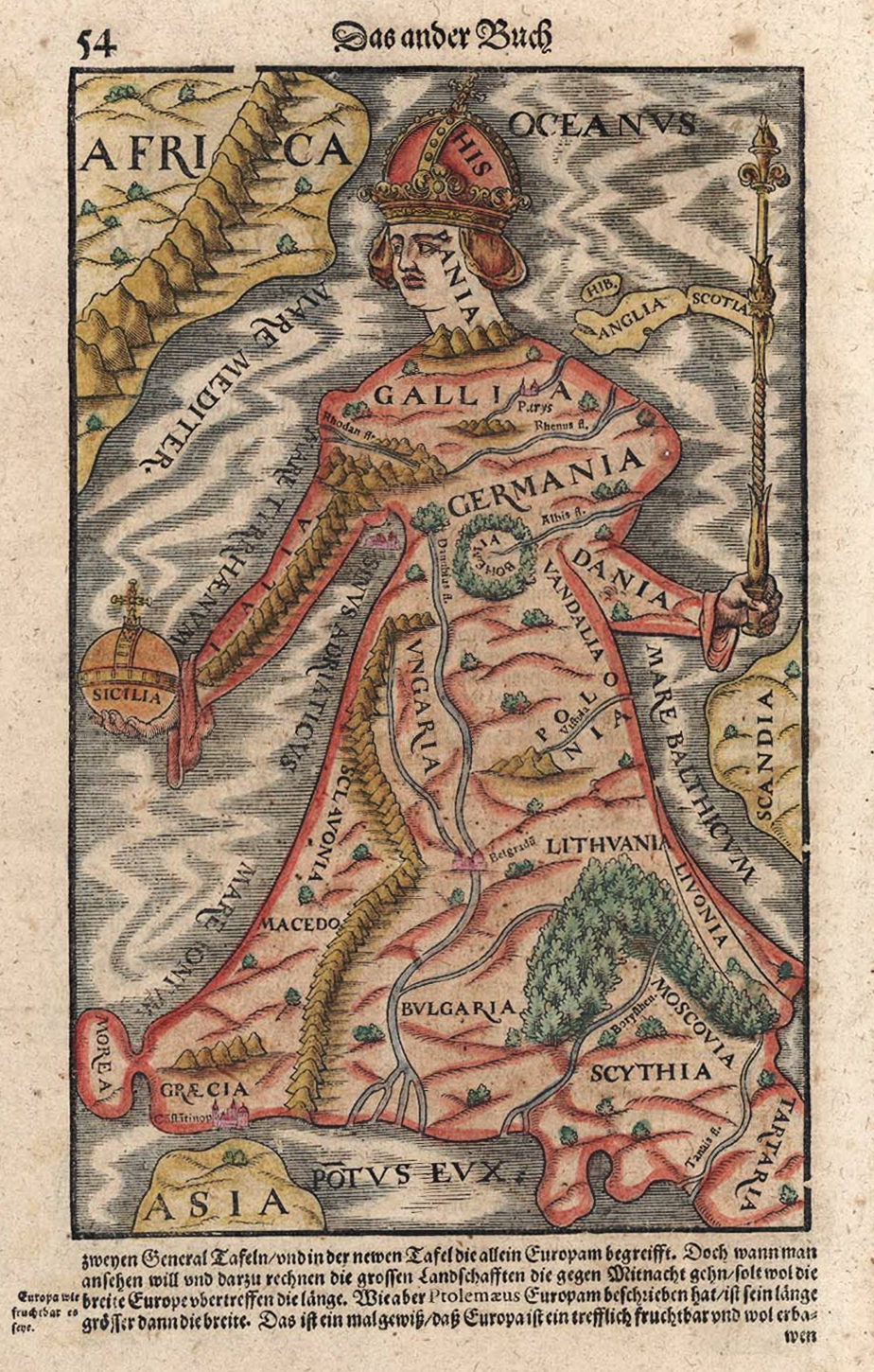
Europa regina, associated with a Habsburg-dominated Europe under Charles V

Charles's victory at the Battle of Pavia (1525) surprised many Italians and Germans and elicited concerns that Charles would endeavor to gain even greater power. Pope Clement VII switched sides and now joined forces with France and prominent Italian states against the Habsburg Emperor, in the War of the League of Cognac. In 1527, due to Charles' inability to pay them sufficiently, his armies in Northern Italy mutinied and sacked Rome itself for loot, forcing Clement, and succeeding popes, to be considerably more prudent in their dealings with secular authorities. In 1533, Clement's refusal to annul Henry VIII of England's marriage to Catherine of Aragon (Charles' aunt) was a direct consequence of his unwillingness to offend the Emperor and perhaps have his capital sacked a second time. The Peace of Barcelona, signed between Charles and the pope in 1529, established a more cordial relationship between the two leaders that effectively made Charles the protector of the Catholic cause and recognized Charles as King of Italy in return for Imperial-Spanish intervention in overthrowing the rebellious Republic of Florence.

The Protestant Reformation had begun in Germany in 1517. Charles, through his position as Holy Roman Emperor, his important holdings along Germany's frontiers, and his close relationship with his Habsburg relatives in Austria, had a vested interest in maintaining the stability of the Holy Roman Empire. The German Peasants' War broke out in Germany in 1524 and ravaged the country until it was brutally put down in 1526. Charles, even as far away from Germany as he was, was committed to keeping order. After the Peasants' War the Protestants organized themselves into a defensive league to protect themselves from Emperor Charles. Under the protection of the Schmalkaldic League, the Protestant states committed a number of outrages in the eyes of the Catholic Church (the confiscation of some ecclesiastical territories, among other things) and defied the authority of the Emperor.

In 1543, Francis I, King of France, announced his unprecedented alliance with the Ottoman sultan, Suleiman the Magnificent, by occupying the Spanish-controlled city of Nice in cooperation with Turkish forces. Henry VIII of England, who bore a greater grudge against France than he held against the Emperor for standing in the way of his divorce, joined Charles in his invasion of France. Although the Spanish army was soundly defeated at the Battle of Ceresole, in Savoy Henry fared better, and France was forced to accept terms. The Austrians, led by Charles's younger brother Ferdinand, continued to fight the Ottomans in the east. With France defeated, Charles went to take care of an older problem: the Schmalkaldic League.

Perhaps more important to the strategy of the Spanish king, the League had allied itself with the French, and efforts in Germany to undermine the League had been rebuffed. Francis's defeat in 1544 led to the annulment of the alliance with the Protestants, and Charles took advantage of the opportunity. He first tried the path of negotiation at the Council of Trent in 1545, but the Protestant leadership, feeling betrayed by the stance taken by the Catholics at the council, went to war, led by the Elector of Saxony Maurice. In response, Charles invaded Germany at the head of a mixed Dutch-Spanish army, hoping to restore the Imperial authority. The Emperor personally inflicted a decisive defeat on the Protestants at the historic Battle of Mühlberg in 1547. In 1555, Charles signed the Peace of Augsburg with the Protestant states and restored stability in Germany on his principle of cuius regio, eius religio ("whose realm, his religion"). Charles's involvement in Germany would establish a role for Spain as protector of the Catholic Habsburg cause in the Holy Roman Empire.

In 1526, Charles married Infanta Isabella, the sister of John III of Portugal. In 1556 he abdicated from his positions, giving his Spanish empire to his only surviving son, Philip II of Spain, and the Holy Roman Empire to his brother, Ferdinand. Charles retired to the monastery of Yuste (Extremadura, Spain), and died in 1558.

=== Philip II (1558–1598) ===
Spain was not yet at peace, as the aggressive Henry II of France came to the throne in 1547 and renewed the conflict between the two countries four years later. Charles' successor, Philip II, aggressively conducted the war against France, crushing a French army at the Battle of St. Quentin in Picardy in 1557 and defeating Henry again at the Battle of Gravelines the following year. The Peace of Cateau-Cambrésis, signed in 1559, permanently recognized Spanish claims in Italy. In the celebrations that followed the treaty, Henry was killed by a stray splinter from a lance. France was stricken for the next forty years by civil war and unrest and was unable to effectively compete with Spain and the Habsburgs in the European power struggle. Freed from any serious French opposition, Spain saw the height of its might and territorial reach in the period 1559–1643.

The Spanish Empire had grown substantially since the days of Ferdinand and Isabella. The Aztec and Inca empires were conquered during Charles' reign, from 1519 to 1521 and 1540 to 1558, respectively. Spanish settlements were established in the New World: Mexico City, the most important colonial city established in 1524 to be the primary center of administration in the New World; Florida, colonized in the 1560s; Buenos Aires, established in 1536; and New Granada (modern Colombia, Ecuador, Panama and Venezuela), colonized in the 1530s. The Spanish Empire abroad became the source of Spanish wealth and power in Europe. But as precious metal shipments rapidly expanded late in the century it contributed to the general inflation that was affecting the whole of Europe. Instead of fueling the Spanish economy, American silver made the country increasingly dependent on foreign sources of raw materials and manufactured goods. In 1557, Spain was forced, for the first of many times, to declare a sovereign default, requiring it to partially repudiate its debt through consolidation and conversion.

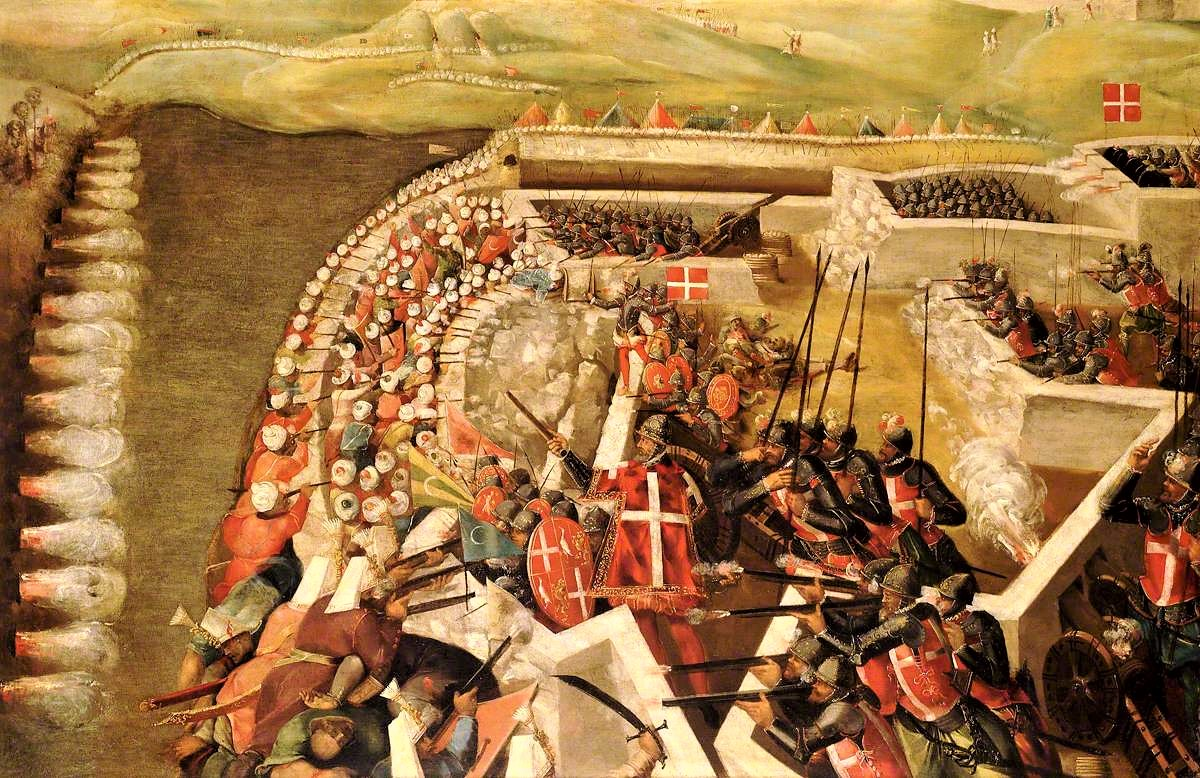
Turkish attack on the post of the Castilian knights during the Great Siege of Malta on 21 August 1565. Don García de Toledo played a decisive role as the commander of the Spanish relief forces.

The Peace of Cateau-Cambrésis in 1559 concluded the war with France, leaving Spain at a considerable advantage. However, the government was still mired in debt, and declared bankruptcy that year. Most of the government's revenues came from taxes and excise duties, not imported silver and other goods. The Ottoman Empire had long menaced the fringes of the Habsburg dominions in Austria and northwest Africa. In response Ferdinand and Isabella had sent expeditions to North Africa, capturing Melilla in 1497 and Oran in 1509. Charles had preferred to combat the Ottomans through a considerably more maritime strategy, hampering Ottoman landings on the Venetian territories in the Eastern Mediterranean. Only in response to raids on the eastern coast of Spain did Charles personally lead attacks against holdings in North Africa (1535). In 1560, the Ottomans battled the Spanish Navy off the coast of Tunisia, but in 1565 Ottoman troops landing on the strategically vital island of Malta, defended by the Knights of St. John, were defeated. The death of Suleiman the Magnificent the following year and his succession by Selim II emboldened Philip, who resolved to carry the war to the Ottoman homelands. In 1571, a mixed naval expedition of Spanish, Venetian, and Papal ships led by Charles' illegitimate son Don John of Austria annihilated the Ottoman fleet at the Battle of Lepanto, in the largest naval battle fought in European waters since Actium in 31 BC. The fleet included Miguel de Cervantes, future author of the historic Spanish novel Don Quixote. The victory curbed the Ottoman naval threat against European territory, particularly in the western Mediterranean, and the loss of experienced sailors was to be a major handicap in facing Christian fleets. Yet the Turks succeeded in rebuilding their navy in a year, using it handily to consolidate Ottoman dominance over most of the Mediterranean's African coast and eastern islands. Philip lacked the resources to fight both the Netherlands and the Ottoman Empire at the same time, and the stalemate in the Mediterranean continued until Spain agreed to a truce in 1580.

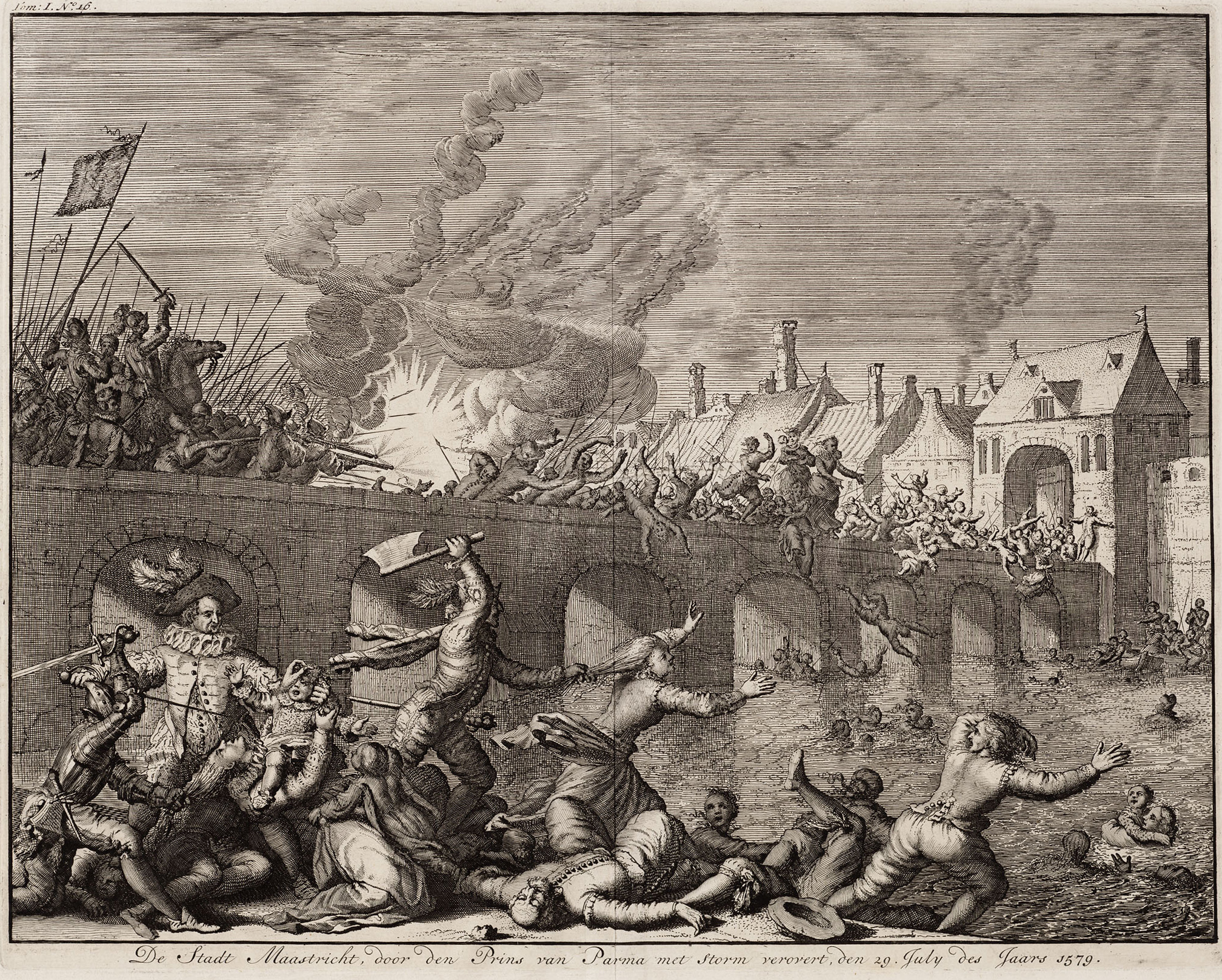
The Spanish Fury at Maastricht in 1579

The time for rejoicing in Madrid was short-lived. In 1566, Calvinist-led riots in the Habsburg Netherlands (roughly equal to modern-day Netherlands and Belgium, inherited by Philip from Charles and his Burgundian forebears) prompted Fernando Álvarez de Toledo, 3rd Duke of Alba to conduct a military expedition to restore order. Alba launched an ensuing reign of terror. In 1568, William the Silent led a failed attempt to drive Alba from the Netherlands. This attempt is generally considered to signal the start of the Eighty Years' War that ended with the independence of the United Provinces. The Spanish, who derived a great deal of wealth from the Netherlands and particularly from the vital port of Antwerp, were committed to restoring order and maintaining their hold on the provinces. In 1572, a band of rebel Dutch privateers known as the watergeuzen ("Sea Beggars") seized a number of Dutch coastal towns, proclaimed their support for William and denounced the Spanish leadership.

In 1574, the Spanish army under Luis de Requeséns was repulsed from the Siege of Leiden after the Dutch destroyed the dykes that held back the North Sea from the low-lying provinces. In 1576, faced with the costs of his 80,000-man army of occupation in the Netherlands and the massive fleet that had won at Lepanto, Philip was forced to accept bankruptcy. The army in the Netherlands mutinied not long after, seizing Antwerp and looting the southern Netherlands, prompting several cities in the previously peaceful southern provinces to join the rebellion. The Spanish chose the route of negotiation, and pacified most of the southern provinces again with the Union of Arras in 1579.

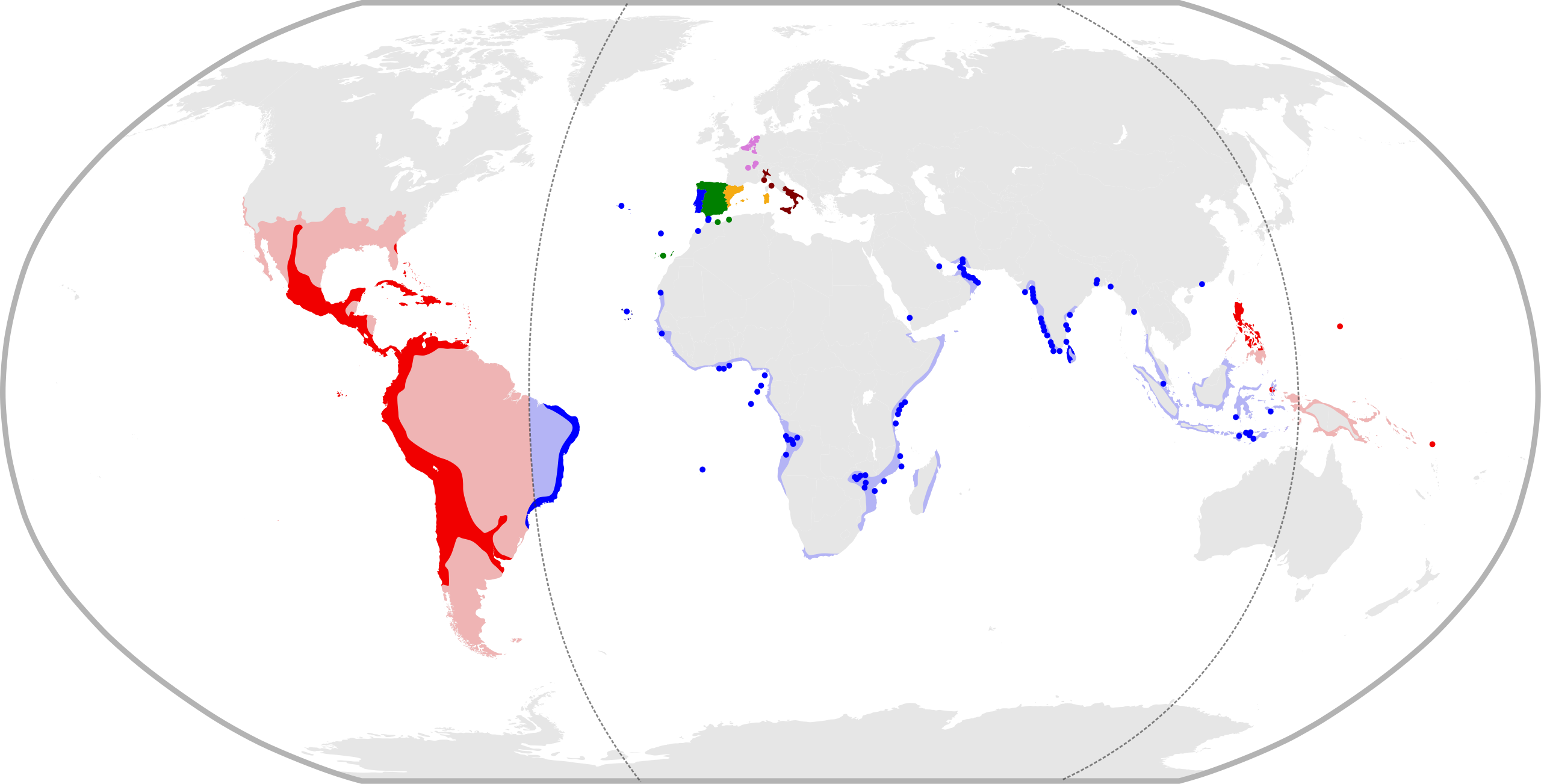
The Iberian Union in 1598, during the reign of Philip II Territories appointed to the Council of Castile. Territories appointed to the Council of Aragon. Territories appointed to the Council of Portugal. Territories appointed to the Council of Italy. Territories appointed to the Council of the Indies. Territories appointed to the Council of Flanders comprising the disputed territories of the United Provinces.

The Arras agreement required all Spanish troops to leave the Netherlands. Meanwhile, Philip had his eye on uniting the entire Iberian Peninsula under his rule, a traditional objective of Spanish monarchs. The opportunity came in 1578 when the Portuguese king Sebastian launched a crusade against the Saadi Sultanate of Morocco. The expedition ended in disaster and Sebastian's disappearance at the Battle of the Three Kings. His aged uncle Henry ruled until he died in 1580. Although Philip had long prepared for the takeover of Portugal, he still found it necessary to launch a military occupation led by the Duke of Alba. Philip took the title of King of Portugal, but otherwise the country remained autonomous, retaining its own laws, currency, and institutions. However, Portugal surrendered all independence in foreign policy, and relations between the two countries were never warm.

France formed the cornerstone of Spanish foreign policy. For 30 years after Cateau-Cambrésis, it was engulfed in civil war. After 1590, the Spanish intervened directly in France on the side of the Catholic League, winning battles, but failing to prevent Henry of Navarre from becoming king as Henry IV. To Spain's dismay, Pope Clement VIII accepted Henry into the Catholic Church.

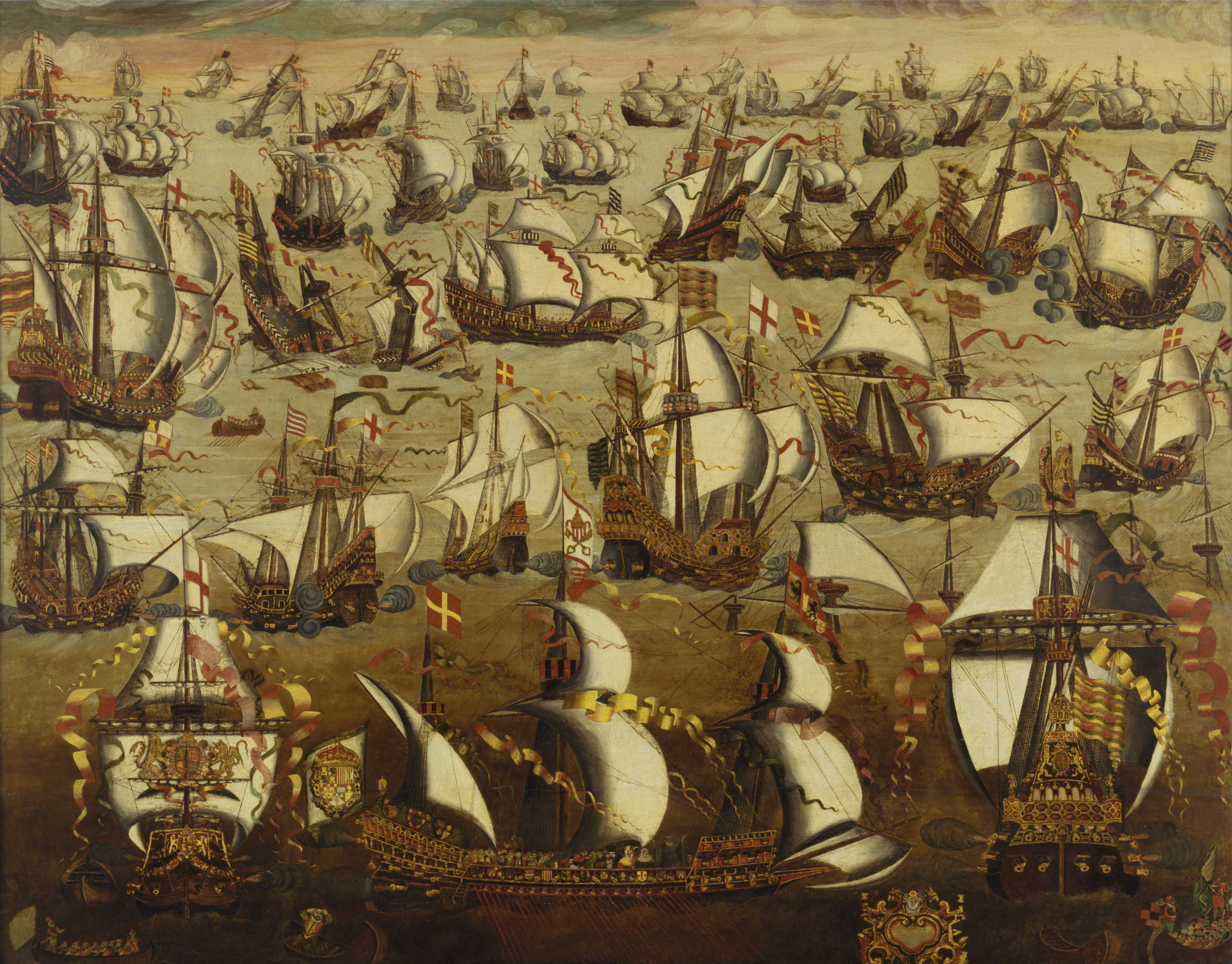
English ships and the Spanish Armada, August 1588

To keep the Netherlands under control required an extensive occupation force, and Spain was still financially strapped since the 1576 bankruptcy. In 1584, William the Silent was assassinated by a Catholic, and the death of the popular Dutch resistance leader was expected to bring an end to the war. However it did not happen. In 1586, Queen Elizabeth I of England supported the Protestant cause in the Netherlands and France. Sir Francis Drake launched attacks against Spanish merchants in the Caribbean and the Pacific Ocean, along with a particularly aggressive attack on the port of Cádiz. Philip sent the Spanish Armada to attack England. Numbering 130 ships and 30,000 men, it was led by Alonso de Guzmán y Sotomayor, 7th Duke of Medina Sidonia. The Armada's goal was to ferry the Army of Flanders from the Netherlands to invade England. After three days of fighting with the English fleet, the Armada withdrew and was forced to make the journey around the coast of Scotland and Ireland, many ships being wrecked by storms.

Spain had invested itself in the religious warfare in France after Henry II's death. In 1589, Henry III, the last of the House of Valois, died at the walls of Paris. His successor, Henry IV, the first king from the House of Bourbon, was a man of great ability, winning key victories against the Catholic League at Arques (1589) and Ivry (1590). Committed to stopping Henry from becoming king of France, the Spanish divided their army in the Netherlands and invaded France in 1590.

Faced with wars against England, France, and the Netherlands, the Spanish government found that neither the New World silver nor steadily increasing taxes were enough to cover their expenses, and went bankrupt again in 1596. To bring finances into order, military campaigns were reduced and the over-stretched forces went into a largely defensive mode. In 1598, shortly before his death, Philip II made peace with France, withdrawing his forces from French territory and stopping payments to the Catholic League after accepting the new convert to Catholicism, Henry IV, as the rightful French king. Meanwhile, Castile was ravaged by a plague that had arrived by ship from the north, losing half a million people. Yet as the 17th century began, and despite her travails, Spain was still unquestionably the dominant power.

==== Ottoman Turks, the Mediterranean, and North Africa during Philip II's rule ====
The first years of his reign, from 1556 to 1566, Philip II was concerned principally with Muslim allies of the Turks, based in Tripoli and Algiers, the bases from which North African (Muslim) forces under the corsair Dragut preyed upon Christian shipping. In 1560, a Spanish-led Christian fleet was sent to recapture Tripoli (captured by Spain in 1510), but the fleet was destroyed by the Ottomans at the Battle of Djerba. The Ottomans attempted to seize the Spanish military-bases of Oran and Mers El Kébir on the North African coast in 1563, but were repulsed. In 1565, the Ottomans sent a large expedition to Malta, which laid siege to several forts on the island. A Spanish relief force from Sicily drove the Ottomans (exhausted from a long siege) away from the island. The death of Suleiman the Magnificent the following year and his succession by his less capable son Selim II emboldened Philip, who resolved to carry the war to the Sultan himself.

The Battle of Lepanto (1571)

In 1571, a Christian fleet, led by Philip's half-brother John of Austria, annihilated the Ottoman fleet at the Battle of Lepanto in the waters off southwestern Greece. (Note: The battle ended the threat of Ottoman naval hegemony in the Mediterranean. The victory was aided by the participation of various military leaders and contingents from parts of Italy under Philip's rule. German soldiers took part in the capture of Peñón de Vélez de la Gomera in North Africa in 1564. By 1575, German soldiers were three-quarters of Philip's troops.) Despite the significant victory, however, the Holy League's disunity prevented the victors from capitalizing on their triumph. Plans to seize the Dardanelles as a step towards recovering Constantinople for Christendom, were ruined by bickering amongst the allies. With a massive effort, the Ottoman Empire rebuilt its navy. Within six months a new fleet was able to reassert Ottoman naval supremacy in the eastern Mediterranean. John captured Tunis (in present-day Tunisia) from the Ottomans in 1573, but it was soon lost again. The Ottoman sultan agreed to a truce in the Mediterranean with Philip in 1580. In the western Mediterranean, Philip pursued a defensive policy with the construction of a series of military forts (presidios) and peace agreements with some of the Muslim rulers of North Africa.

In the first half of the 17th century, Spanish ships attacked the Anatolian coast, defeating larger Ottoman fleets at the Battle of Cape Celidonia and the Battle of Cape Corvo. Larache and La Mamora, on the Moroccan Atlantic coast, and the island of Alhucemas, in the Mediterranean, were taken. However, during the second half of the 17th century, Larache and La Mamora were also lost.

==== Conflicts in North-West Europe ====
Spanish Road (1567–1620)

Philip led Spain into the final phase of the Italian Wars, crushing a French army at the Battle of St. Quentin (1557) in Picardy and defeating the French again at the Battle of Gravelines. The Peace of Cateau-Cambrésis, signed in 1559, permanently recognized Spanish claims in Italy. France was stricken for the next thirty years by chronic civil war and unrest. During this period, it was removed from effectively competing with Spain and the Habsburg family in European power games. Freed from effective French opposition, Spain attained the apogee of its might and territorial reach in the period 1559–1643.

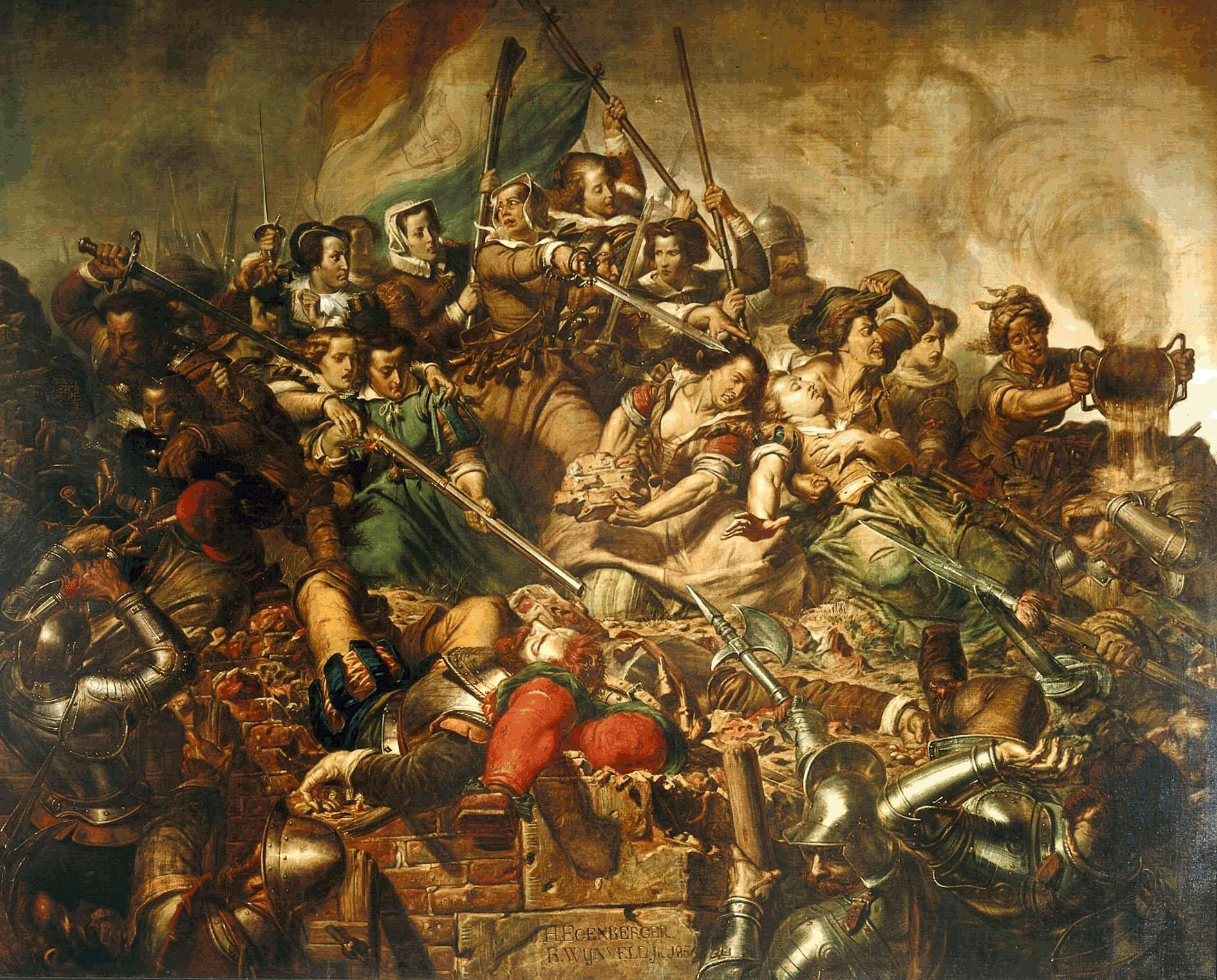
Siege of Haarlem (1572–73)

In 1566, Calvinist-led riots in the Netherlands prompted the Duke of Alba to march into Brussels at the head of a large army to restore order. In 1568, William of Orange, a German nobleman, led a failed attempt to drive Alba from the Netherlands. The Battle of Rheindalen is often seen as the unofficial start of the Eighty Years' War that led to the separation of the northern and southern Netherlands and to the formation of the United Provinces. The Spanish, who derived a great deal of wealth from the Netherlands and particularly from the vital port of Antwerp, were committed to restoring order and maintaining their hold on the provinces. (Note: According to Luc-Normand Tellier, "It is estimated that the port of Antwerp was earning the Spanish crown seven times more revenues than the Americas.") During the initial phase of the war, the revolt was largely unsuccessful. Spain regained control over most of the rebelling provinces. This period is known as the "Spanish Fury" due to the high number of massacres, instances of mass looting, and total destruction of multiple cities between 1572 and 1579.

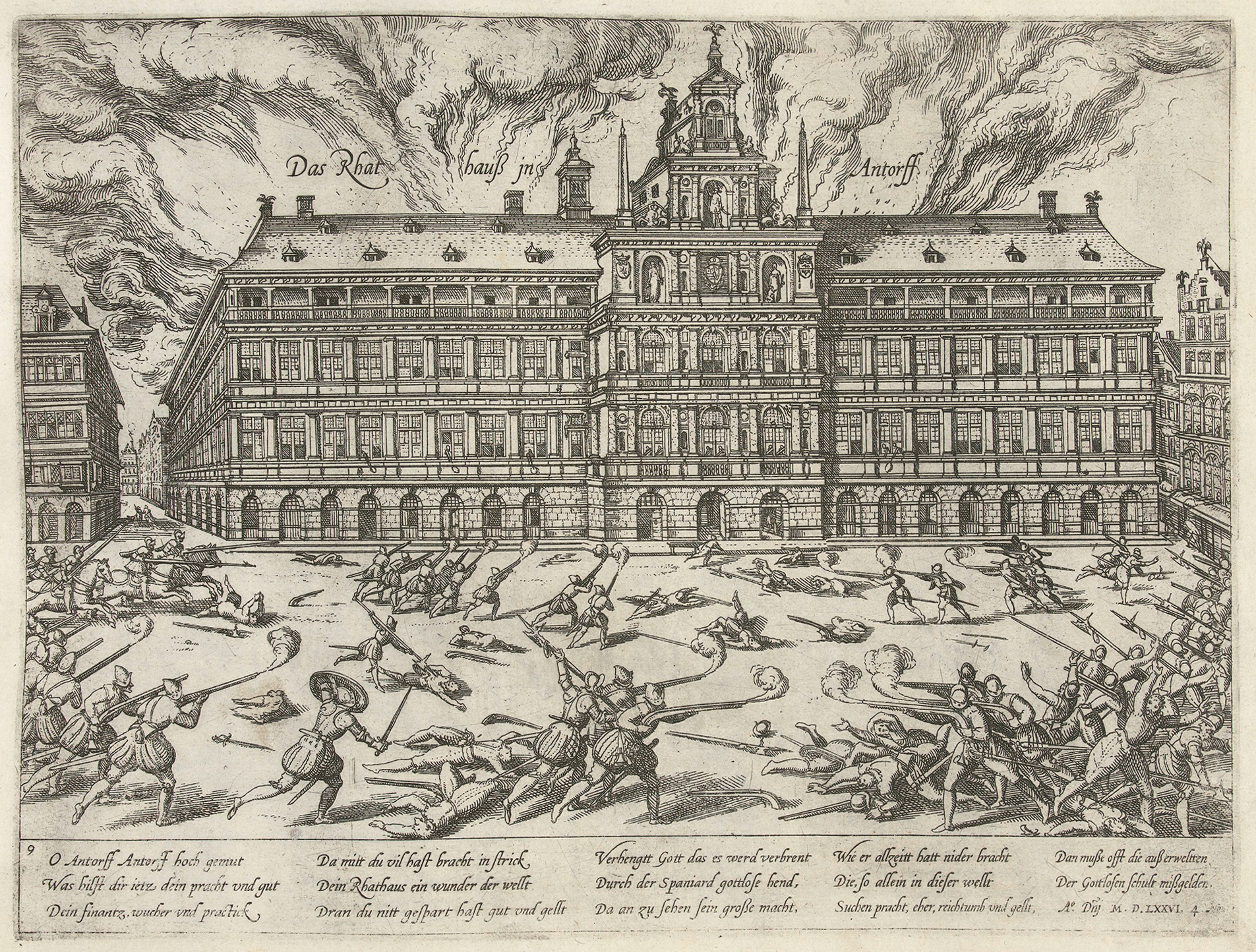
Spanish Fury at Antwerp, demonstration of Spanish military power as a leading world power at the time.

In January 1579, Friesland, Gelderland, Groningen, Holland, Overijssel, Utrecht and Zeeland formed the United Provinces which became the Dutch Netherlands of today. Meanwhile, Spain sent Alexander Farnese, Duke of Parma with 20,000 well-trained troops into the Netherlands. Groningen, Breda, Kampen, Dunkirk, Antwerp, and Brussels, among others, were put to siege. Farnese eventually secured the Southern provinces for Spain. After the Spanish capture of Maastricht in 1579, the Dutch began to turn on William of Orange. William was assassinated by a supporter of Philip in 1584.

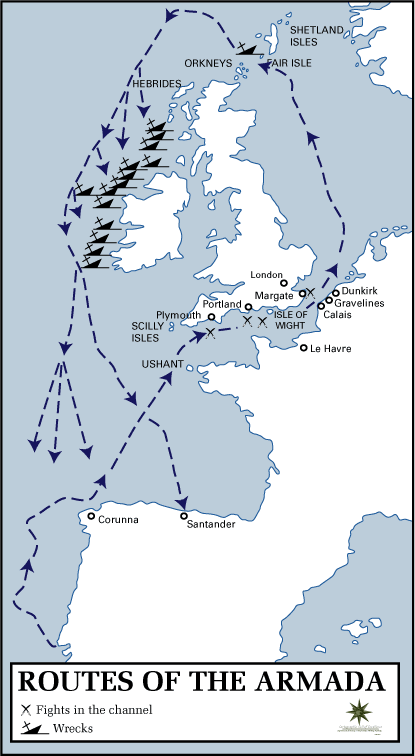
Routes of the Spanish Armada

After the Fall of Antwerp, the Queen of England began to aid the Northern provinces and sent troops there in 1585. English forces under Robert Dudley, 1st Earl of Leicester and then Peregrine Bertie, 13th Baron Willoughby de Eresby, faced the Spanish in the Netherlands under Farnese in a series of largely indecisive actions that tied down significant numbers of Spanish troops and bought time for the Dutch to reorganize their defenses. The Spanish Armada suffered defeat at the hands of the English in 1588 and the situation in the Netherlands became increasingly difficult to manage. Maurice of Nassau, William's son, recaptured Deventer, Groningen, Nijmegen and Zutphen. The Spanish were on the defensive, mainly because they had wasted too much resources on the attempted invasion of England and on expeditions in northern France. In 1595, Henry IV of France declared war on Spain, further reducing its ability to launch offensive warfare on the United Provinces. Philip had been forced to declare bankruptcy in 1557, 1560, 1576 and 1596. However, by regaining control of the sea, Spain was able to greatly increase the supply of gold and silver from America, which allowed it to increase military pressure on England and France.

Under financial and military pressure, in 1598 Philip ceded the Spanish Netherlands to his daughter Isabella Clara Eugenia, following the conclusion of the Treaty of Vervins with France.

==== Spanish America ====
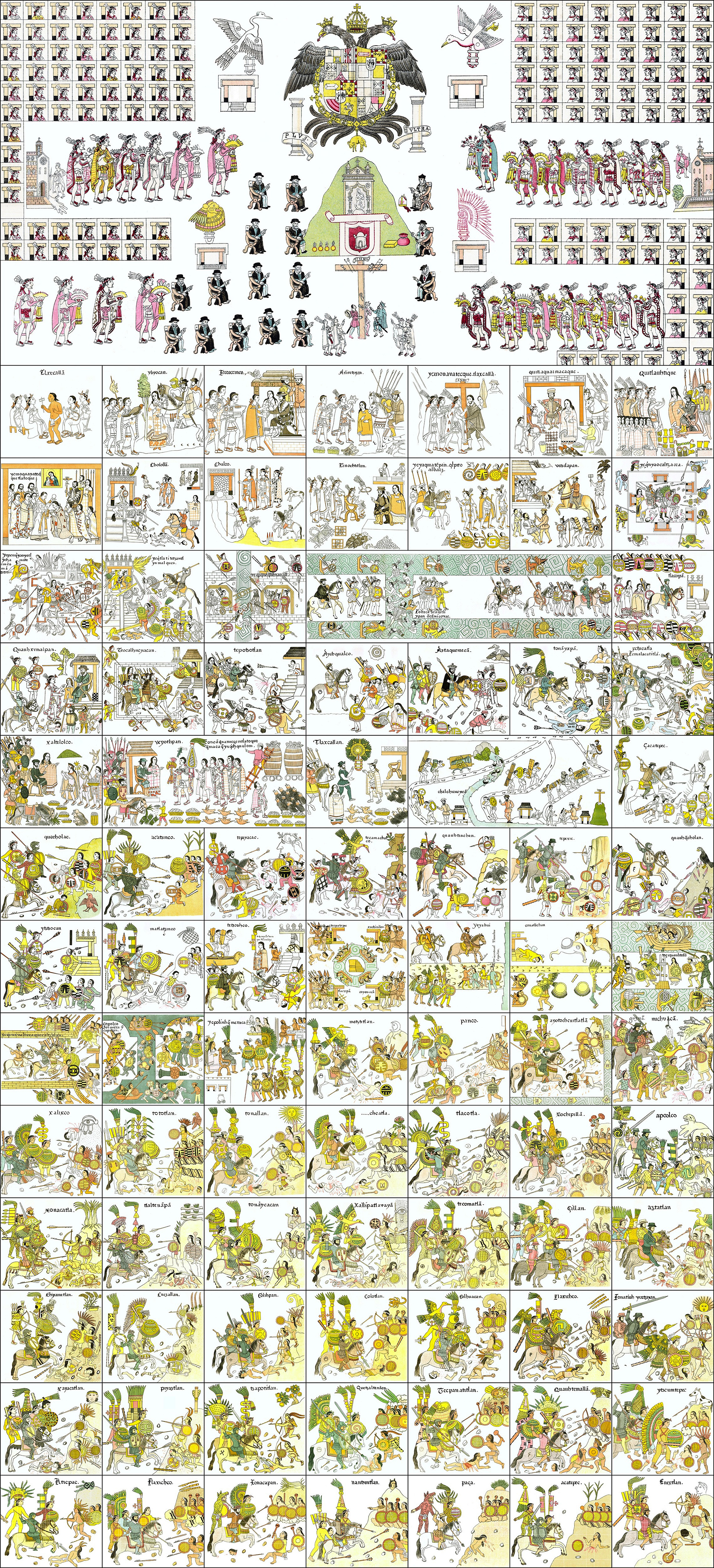
Tlaxcalan codex including Spain in the top tier. Full History of Tlaxcala, 1585.

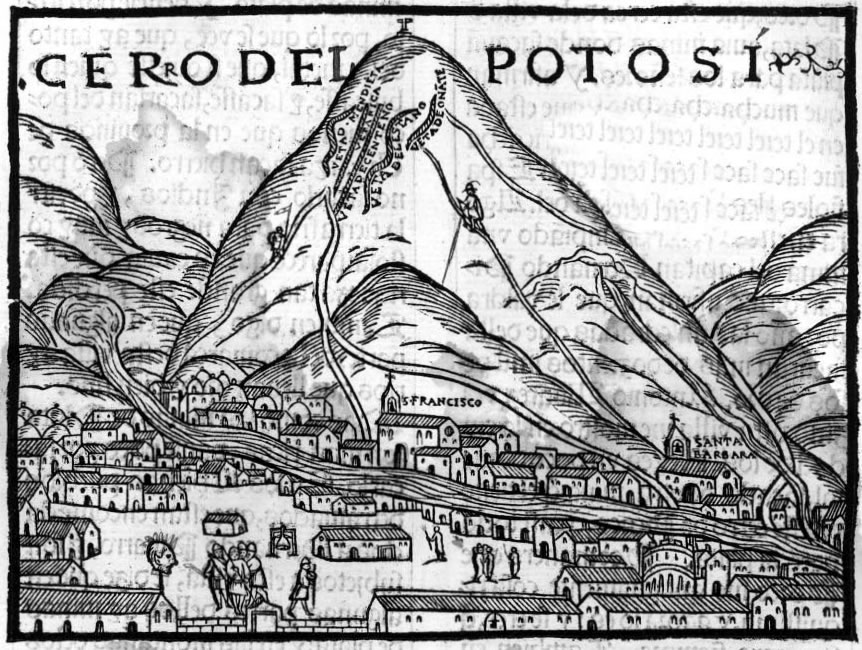
Potosi, discovered in 1545, produced massive amounts of silver from a single site in upper Peru. The first image published in Europe. Pedro Cieza de León, 1553.

Under Philip II, royal power over the Indies increased, but the crown knew little about its overseas possessions. Although the Council of the Indies was tasked with oversight there, it acted without advice of high officials with direct colonial experience. Another serious problem was that the crown did not know what Spanish laws were in force there. To remedy the situation, Philip appointed Juan de Ovando, who was named president of the council, to give advice. Ovando appointed a "chronicler and cosmographer of the Indies", Juan López de Velasco, to gather information about the crown's holdings, which resulted in the Relaciones geográficas in the 1580s.

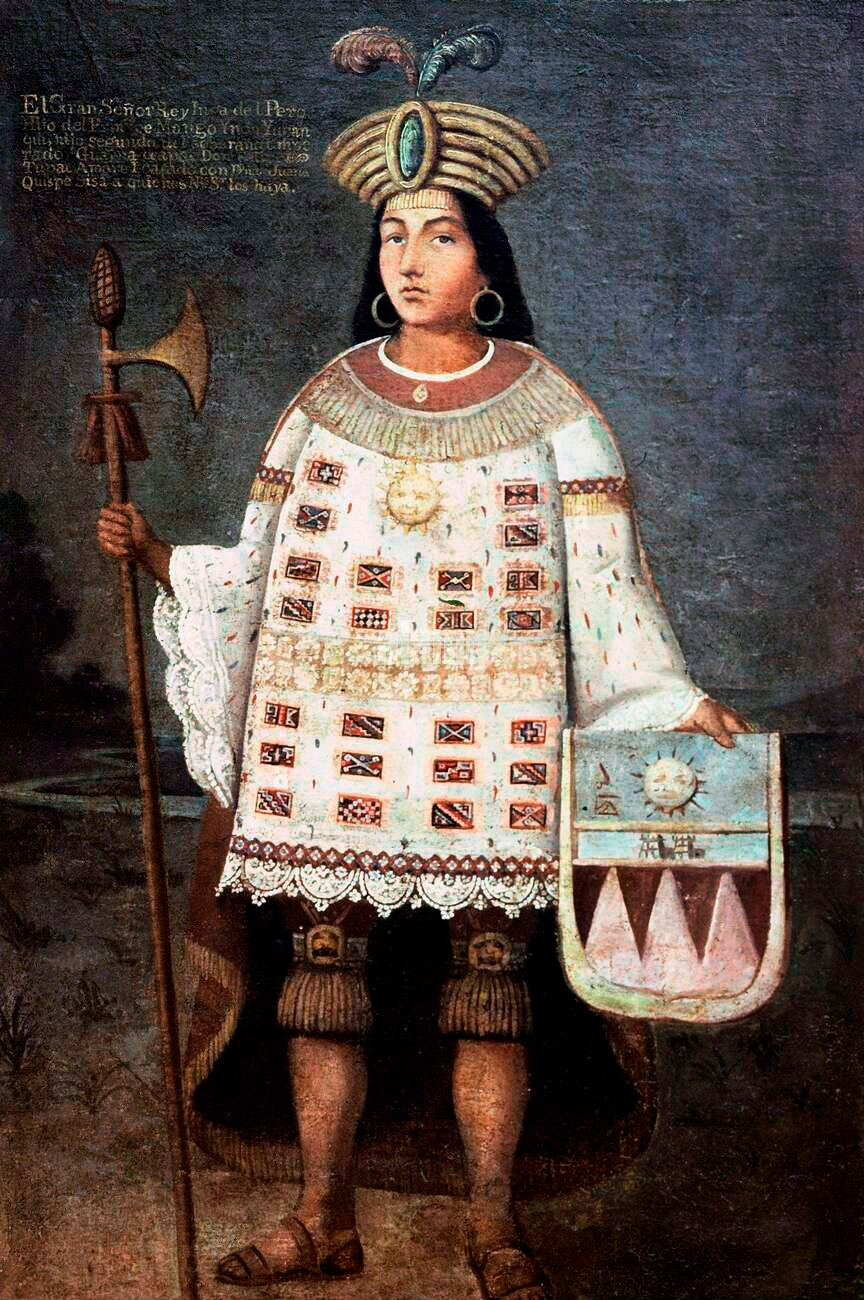
The last Inca leader, Túpac Amaru was executed in 1572 at the order of the Viceroy Francisco de Toledo.

The crown sought greater control over encomenderos, who had attempted to establish themselves as a local aristocracy; strengthened the power of the ecclesiastical hierarchy; shored up religious orthodoxy by the establishment of the Inquisition in Lima and Mexico City (1571); and increased revenues from silver mines in Peru and in Mexico, discovered in the 1540s. Particularly important was the crown's appointment of two able viceroys, Don Francisco de Toledo as Viceroy of Peru (r. 1569–1581), and in New Spain, Martín Enríquez de Almanza (r. 1568–1580), who was subsequently appointed viceroy to replace Toledo in Peru.

In Peru, after decades of political unrest, with ineffective viceroys and encomenderos wielding undue power, weak royal institutions, a renegade Neo-Inca State existing in Vilcabamba, and waning revenue from the Cerro Rico silver mine of Potosí, Toledo's appointment was a major step forward for royal control. He built on reforms attempted under earlier viceroys, but he is often credited with a major transformation in crown rule in Peru. Toledo formalized the labor draft of Andean commoners, the mit'a, to guarantee a labor supply for both the silver mine at Potosí and the mercury mine at Huancavelica. He established administrative districts of corregimiento, and resettled native Andeans in reducciones to better rule them. Under Toledo, the last stronghold of the Inca state was destroyed and the last Inca emperor, Túpac Amaru, was executed. Silver from Potosí flowed to coffers in Spain and paid for Spain's wars in Europe.

In New Spain, Viceroy Enríquez organized the defense of the northern frontier against nomadic and bellicose indigenous groups, who attacked the transport lines of silver from the northern mines. In the religious sphere, the crown sought to bring the power of the religious orders under control with the Ordenanza del Patronazgo, ordering friars to give up their Indian parishes and turn them over to the diocesan clergy, who were more closely controlled by the crown.

The Spanish Inquisition expanded to the Indies in 1565 and was in place by 1570 in Lima and Mexico City. It drew many colonial Spaniards into torture chambers. Native Americans were exempt.

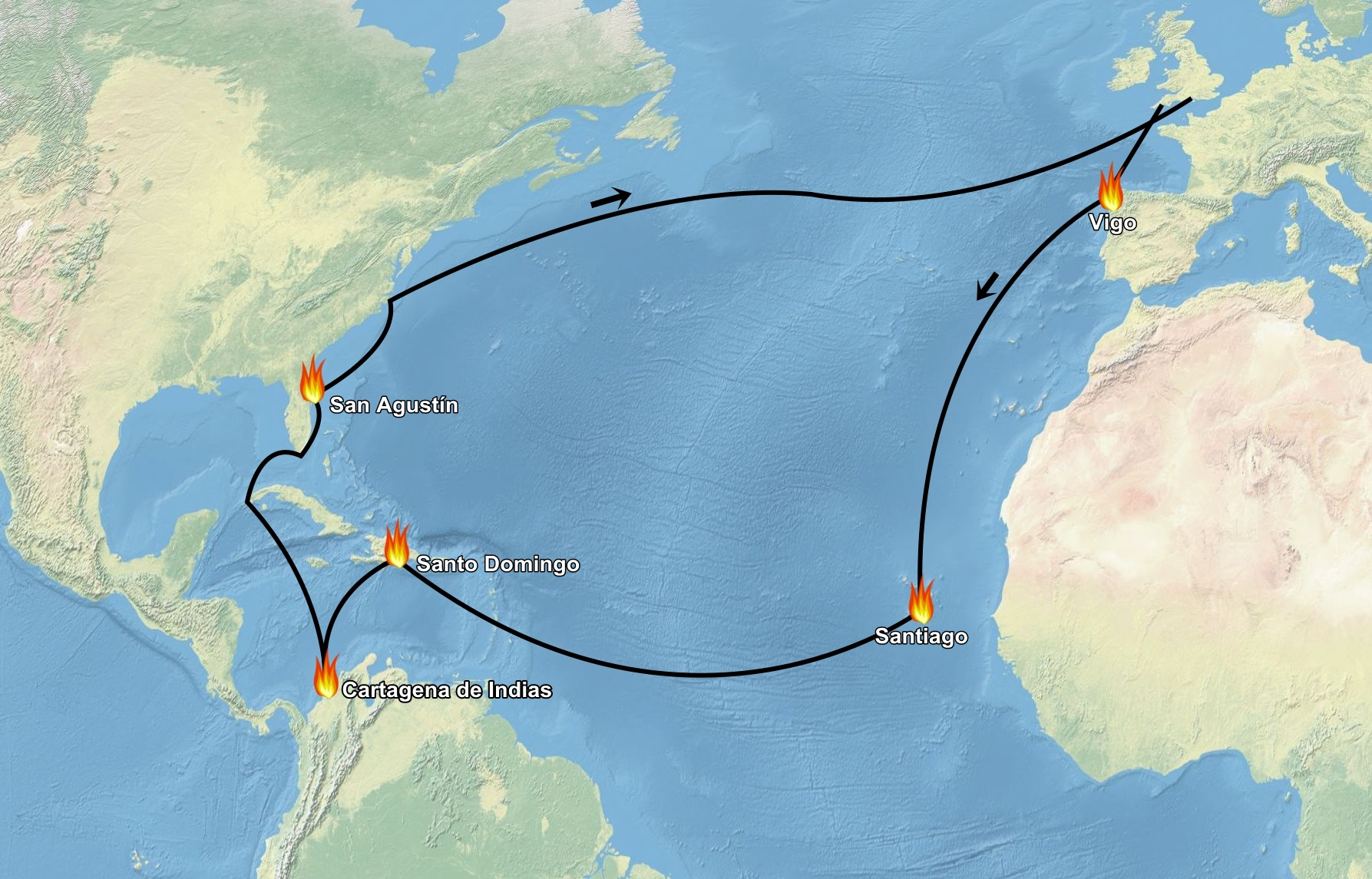
Sir Francis Drake's voyage, 1585–86

The crown expanded its global claims and defended existing ones in the Indies. Transpacific explorations had resulted in Spain claiming the Philippines and the establishment of Spanish settlements and trade with New Spain. The viceroyalty of New Spain was given jurisdiction over the Philippines, which became the entrepôt for Asian trade. Philip's succession to the crown of Portugal in 1580 complicated the situation on the ground in the Indies between Spanish and Portuguese settlers, although Brazil and Spanish America were administered through separate councils in Spain.

Spain dealt with English encroachment on Spain's maritime control in the Indies, particularly by Sir Francis Drake and his cousin John Hawkins. In 1568, the Spanish defeated Hawkins' fleet at the Battle of San Juan de Ulúa in present-day Mexico. In 1585, Drake sailed for the West Indies and sacked Santo Domingo, captured Cartagena de Indias, and St. Augustine in Florida. Both Drake and Hawkins died of disease during the disastrous 1595–96 expedition against Puerto Rico (Battle of San Juan), Panama, and other targets in the Spanish Main, a severe setback in which the English suffered heavy losses in men and ships.

The Spaniards penetrated into Mapuche territory during the conquest of Chile until the Battle of Curalaba in 1598 and the following destruction of the Seven Cities led to the establishment of a clear frontier between the Spanish domains and the land of the independent Mapuche.

==== The Philippines, the Sultanate of Brunei and Southeast Asia ====
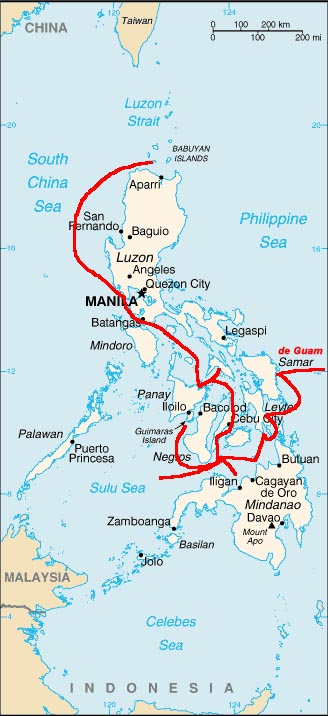
Routes of early Spanish expeditions in the Philippines.

With the conquest and settlement of the Philippines, the Spanish Empire reached its greatest extent. In 1564, Miguel López de Legazpi was commissioned by the viceroy of New Spain (Mexico), Don Luís de Velasco, to lead an expedition in the Pacific Ocean to find the Spice Islands, where earlier explorers Ferdinand Magellan and Ruy López de Villalobos had landed in 1521 and 1543, respectively. The westward sailing to reach the sources of spices continued to be a necessity with the Ottomans still controlled major choke points in central Asia. It was unclear how the agreement between Spain and Portugal dividing the Atlantic world affected finds on the other side of the Pacific. Spain had ceded its rights to the "Spice Islands" to Portugal in the Treaty of Saragossa in 1529, but the appellation was vague as was their exact delineation. The Legazpi expedition was ordered by King Philip II, after whom the Philippines had earlier been named by Ruy López de Villalobos, when Philip was heir to the throne. The King stated that "the main purpose of this expedition is to establish the return route from the western isles, since it is already known that the route to them is fairly short." The Viceroy died in July 1564, but the Audiencia and de Legazpi completed the preparations for the expedition. On embarking on the expedition, Spain lacked maps or information to guide the King's decision to authorize the expedition. That realization subsequently led to the creation of reports from the various regions of the empire, the relaciones geográficas. The Philippines came under the jurisdiction of the viceroyalty of Mexico, and once the Manila Galleon sailings between Manila and Acapulco were established, Mexico became the Philippines' link to the larger Spanish Empire.

Spanish colonization began in earnest when López de Legazpi arrived from Mexico in 1565 and formed the first settlements in Cebu. Beginning with just five ships and five hundred men accompanied by Augustinian friars, and further strengthened in 1567 by two hundred soldiers, he was able to repel the Portuguese and create the foundations for the colonization of the archipelago. In 1571, the Spanish, their Mexican recruits and their Filipino (Visayan) allies attacked and occupied Maynila, a vassal-state of the Sultanate of Brunei, and negotiated the incorporation of the Kingdom of Tondo which was liberated from the Bruneian Sultanate's control and of whom, their princess, Kandarapa, had a tragic romance with the Mexican-born Conquistador and grandson of Miguel Lopez de Legazpi, Juan de Salcedo. The combined Spanish-Mexican-Filipino forces also built a Christian walled city over the burnt ruins of Muslim Maynila and made it as the new capital of the Spanish East Indies and renamed it Manila. Spaniards were few and life was difficult and they were often outnumbered by their Amerindian recruits and Filipino allies. They attempted to mobilize subordinated populations through the encomienda. Unlike in the Caribbean where the indigenous populations rapidly disappeared, the indigenous populations continued to be robust in the Philippines. One Spaniard described the climate as "cuatro meses de polvo, cuatro meses de lodo, y cuatro meses de todo" (four months of dust, four months of mud, and four months of everything).

Legazpi built a fort in Manila and made overtures of friendship to Lakan Dula, Lakan of Tondo, who accepted. Maynila's former ruler, the Muslim rajah, Rajah Sulayman, who was a vassal to the Sultan of Brunei, refused to submit to Legazpi but failed to get the support of Lakan Dula or of the Pampangan and Pangasinan settlements to the north. When Tarik Sulayman and a force of Kapampangan and Tagalog Muslim warriors attacked the Spaniards in the Battle of Bangkusay, he was finally defeated and killed. The Spanish also repelled an attack by Chinese pirate warlord Limahong.

Simultaneously, the establishment of a Christianized Philippines attracted Chinese traders who exchanged their silk for Mexican silver. Indian and Malay traders also settled in the Philippines too, to trade their spices and gems for the same Mexican silver. The Philippines then became a center for Christian missionary activity that was also directed to Japan. The Philippines even accepted Christian converts from Japan after they were persecuted. Most of the soldiers and settlers sent by the Spanish to the Philippines were either from Mexico or Peru and very little people directly came from Spain. At one point, the royal officials in Manila complained that most of the soldiers who were being sent from New Spain were black, mulatto or Native American, with almost no Spaniards among the contingents.

In 1578, the Castilian War erupted between the Christian Spaniards and Muslim Bruneians over control of the Philippine archipelago. The Spanish were joined by the newly Christianized Non-Muslim Visayans of the Kedatuan of Madja-as who were Animists and Rajahnate of Cebu who were Hindus, plus the Rajahnate of Butuan (who were from northern Mindanao and were Hindus with a Buddhist Monarchy), as well as the remnants of the Kedatuan of Dapitan who were also Animists and had previously waged war against the Islamic nations of the Sultanate of Sulu and Kingdom of Maynila. They fought against the Sultanate of Brunei and its allies, the Bruneian puppet-states of Maynila and Sulu, which had dynastic links with Brunei. The Spanish, its Mexican recruits and Filipino allies assaulted Brunei and seized its capital, Kota Batu. This was achieved partly as a result of the assistance of two noblemen, Pengiran Seri Lela and Pengiran Seri Ratna. The former had traveled to Manila to offer Brunei as a tributary of Spain for help to recover the throne usurped by his brother, Saiful Rijal. The Spanish agreed that if they succeeded in conquering Brunei, Pengiran Seri Lela would indeed become the Sultan, while Pengiran Seri Ratna would be the new Bendahara. In March 1578, the Spanish fleet, led by Francisco de Sande himself, acting as Capitán General, started its journey towards Brunei. The expedition consisted of 400 Spaniards and Mexicans, 1,500 Filipino natives and 300 Borneans. The campaign was one of many, which also included action in Mindanao and Sulu.

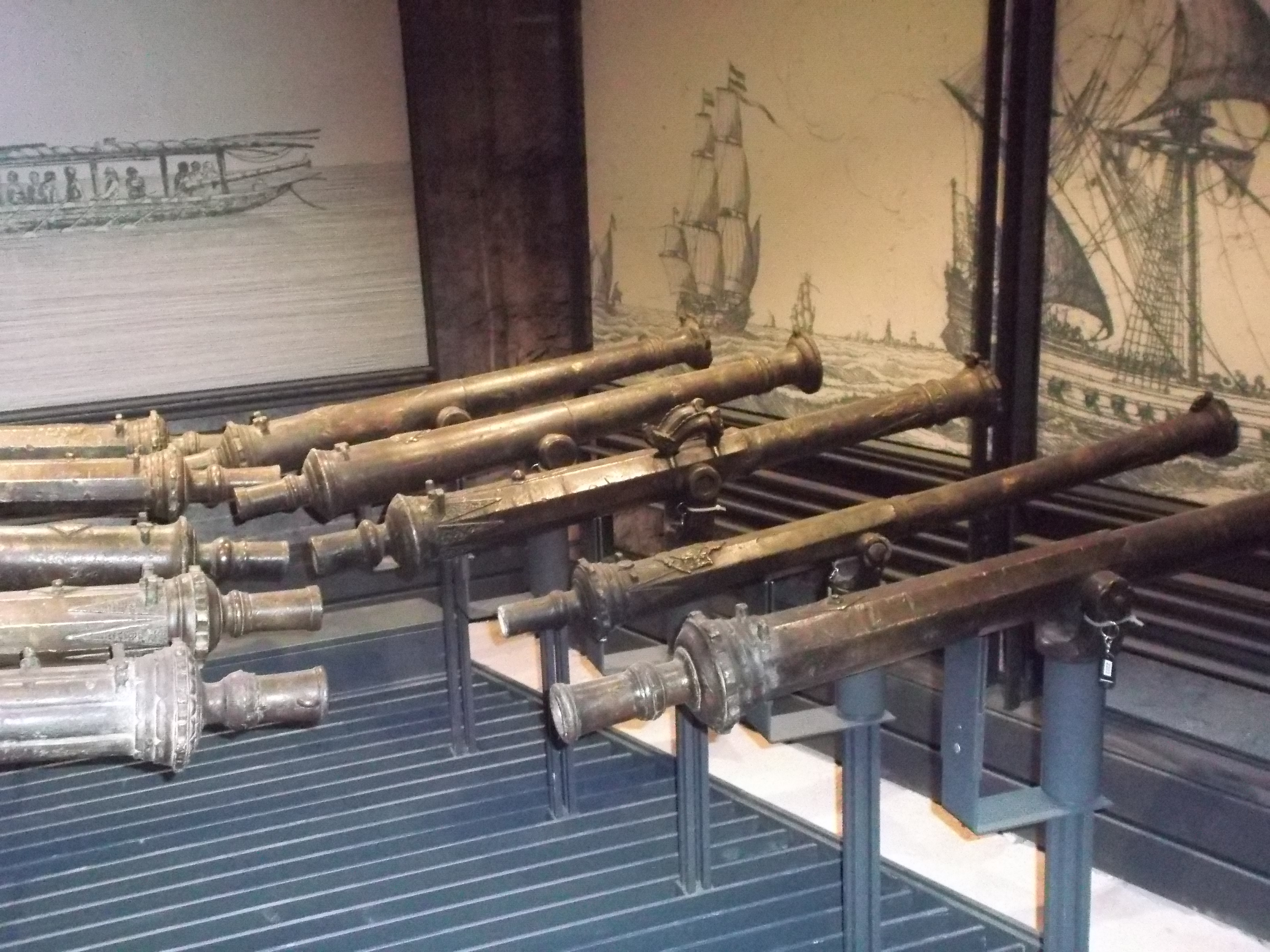
Collection of Philippine lantaka gunpowder weapons in a European museum

The Spanish succeeded in invading the capital on 16 April 1578, with the help of Pengiran Seri Lela and Pengiran Seri Ratna. Sultan Saiful Rijal and Paduka Seri Begawan Sultan Abdul Kahar were forced to flee to Meragang then to Jerudong. In Jerudong, they made plans to chase the conquering army away from Brunei. The Spanish suffered heavy losses due to a cholera or dysentery outbreak. They were so weakened by the illness that they decided to abandon Brunei to return to Manila on 26 June 1578, after just 72 days. Before doing so, they burned the mosque, a high structure with a five-tier roof.

Pengiran Seri Lela died in August–September 1578, probably from the same illness that had afflicted his Spanish allies, although there was suspicion he could have been poisoned by the ruling Sultan. Seri Lela's daughter, the Bruneian princess, left with the Spanish and went on to marry a Christian Tagalog, named Agustín de Legazpi of Tondo, and had children in the Philippines.

In 1587, Magat Salamat, one of the children of Lakan Dula, along with Lakan Dula's nephew and lords of the neighboring areas of Tondo, Pandacan, Marikina, Candaba, Navotas and Bulacan, were executed when the Tondo Conspiracy of 1587–1588 failed. a planned grand alliance with the Japanese Christian-captain, Gayo, and Brunei's Sultan, would have restored the old aristocracy. Its failure resulted in the hanging of Agustín de Legaspi and the execution of Magat Salamat (the crown-prince of Tondo). Thereafter, some of the conspirators were exiled to Guam or Guerrero, Mexico.

The Spanish then conducted the centuries long Spanish–Moro conflict against the Sultanates of Maguindanao, Lanao and Sulu. War was also waged against the Sultanate of Ternate and Tidore, in response to Ternatean slaving and piracy against Spain's allies: Bohol and Butuan. During the Spanish–Moro conflict, the Moros of Muslim Mindanao conducted piracy and slave-raids against Christian settlements in the Philippines. The Spanish fought back by establishing Christian fort-cities such as Zamboanga City on Muslim Mindanao. The Spanish considered their war with the Muslims in Southeast Asia an extension of the Reconquista, a centuries-long campaign to retake and rechristianize the Spanish homeland which was invaded by the Muslims of the Umayyad Caliphate. The Spanish expeditions into the Philippines were also part of a larger Ibero-Islamic world conflict that included a rivalry with the Ottoman Caliphate, which had a center of operations at its nearby vassal, the Sultanate of Aceh.

In 1593, the governor-general of the Philippines, Luis Pérez Dasmariñas, set out to conquer Cambodia, igniting the Cambodian–Spanish War. Some 120 Spaniards, Japanese, and Filipinos, sailing aboard three junks, launched an expedition to Cambodia. After an altercation between the Spanish expedition members and some Chinese merchants at the port left a few Chinese dead, the Spanish were forced to confront the newly declared king, Anacaparan, burning much of his capital while defeating him. In 1599, Malay Muslim merchants defeated and massacred almost the entire contingent of Spanish troops in Cambodia, putting an end to Spanish plans to conquer it. Another expedition, one to conquer Mindanao, was also lacking in success. In 1603, during a Chinese rebellion, Pérez Dasmariñas was beheaded, and his head was mounted in Manila along with those of several other Spanish soldiers.

=== Portugal and the Iberian Union 1580–1640 ===
Spanish Empire of Philip II, III and IV including all charted and claimed territories, maritime claims (mare clausum) and other features.

Despite the fact that during the Iberian Union a certain degree of autonomy and the cultural identity of Portugal was maintained, many historians agree that the dynastic union was in fact a Spanish conquest by keeping Portugal and the Portuguese Empire as part of the Spanish colonial empire under the sovereignty of Philip II of Spain and his successors after the Spanish victory in the War of Portuguese Succession.

In 1580, King Philip saw the opportunity to strengthen his position in Iberia when the last member of the Portuguese royal family, Henry, King of Portugal, died. Philip asserted his claim to the Portuguese throne and in June sent Fernando Álvarez de Toledo, 3rd Duke of Alba with an army to Lisbon to assure his succession. (Note: The Duke of Alba's Spanish army defeated the Portuguese at the Battle of Alcântara on 25 August 1580, and Alba conquered the capital of Lisbon two days later. In 1582, Álvaro de Bazán assembled an armada against the Azores and in July sailed from Lisbon. Filippo di Piero Strozzi, a Florentine mercenary, clashed with Bazán at the Battle of Ponta Delgada, off the island of São Miguel, but was defeated and killed. In 1583, Bazán returned with an invasion force and conquered Terceira. Triumphant, he suggested that he invade England with a 500-ship, 94,000-man armada, but Philip shelved the suggestion.) Philip famously remarked upon his acquisition of the Portuguese throne: "I inherited, I bought, I conquered," a variation on Julius Caesar and Veni, Vidi, Vici. Spanish forces led by Admiral Álvaro de Bazán captured the Azores Islands in 1583, completing the incorporation of Portugal into the Spanish Empire. Thus, Philip added to his possessions a vast colonial empire in Africa, Brazil, and the East Indies, seeing a flood of new revenues coming to the Habsburg crown. The success of colonization all around his empire improved his financial position, enabling him to show greater aggression towards his enemies. The English Armada of 1589 failed to liberate Portugal.

Philip established the Council of Portugal, on the pattern of the royal councils; the Council of Castile, Council of Aragon, and Council of the Indies, that oversaw particular jurisdictions, but all under the same monarch. (Note: In Portugal, the Duke of Alba and the Spanish occupation were little more popular in Lisbon than in Rotterdam. The combined Spanish and Portuguese empires placed into Philip's hands included almost the entirety of the explored New World along with a vast trading empire in Africa and Asia. In 1582, when Philip II moved his court back to Madrid from the Atlantic port of Lisbon, where he had temporarily settled to pacify his new Portuguese kingdom, the pattern was sealed, in spite of what every observant commentator privately noted. "Sea power is more important to the ruler of Spain than any other prince", wrote one commentator, "for it is only by sea power that a single community can be created out of so many so far apart." A writer on tactics in 1638 observed, "The might most suited to the arms of Spain is that which is placed on the seas, but this matter of state is so well known that I should not discuss it, even if I thought it opportune to do so." Portugal and her kingdoms, including Brazil and her African colonies, were under the dominion of the Spanish monarch.) As a result of the Iberian Union, Phillip II's enemies became Portugal's enemies, such as the Dutch in the Dutch–Portuguese War, England or France. War with the Dutch led to invasions of many countries in Asia, including Ceylon and commercial interests in Japan, Africa (Mina), and South America. During the reign of Philip IV (Philip III of Portugal) in 1640, the Portuguese revolted and fought successfully for their independence from the rest of Iberia, although Spain continued to attempt to crush the revolt until 1668. The Council of Portugal was subsequently dissolved.

=== Philip III ===
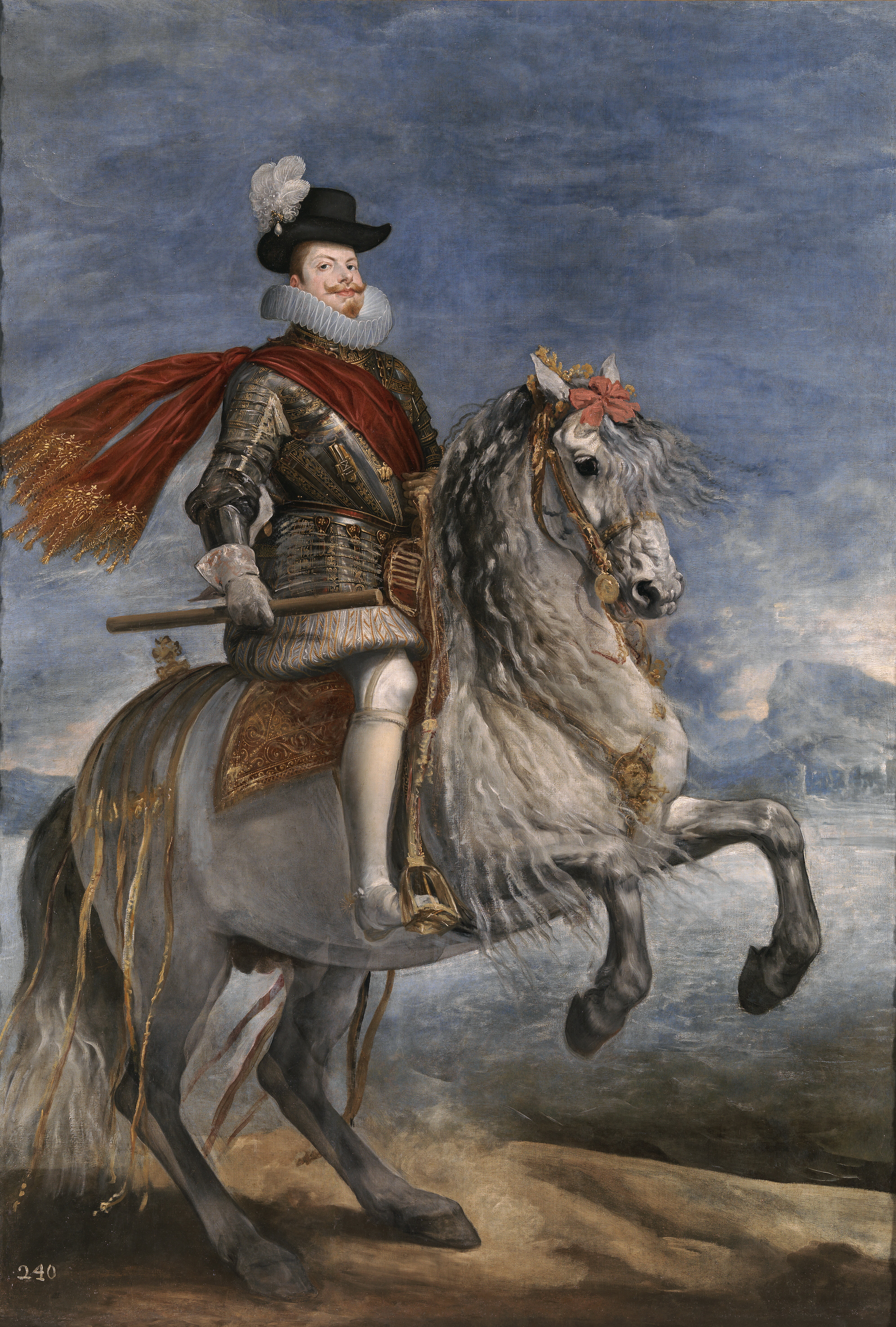
King Philip III of Spain (r. 1598–1621)

Philip III succeeded his father in 1598 but had no interest in politics or government, preferring to engage in lavish court festivities, religious indulgences, and the theatre. He needed someone to do the work of governing, and he settled on Francisco Gómez de Sandoval y Rojas, Duke of Lerma.

Under the guidance of Lerma, Philip III's government resorted to a tactic that had been resolutely resisted by Philip II, paying for the budget deficits by the mass minting of increasingly worthless vellones, causing inflation. In 1607, the government faced bankruptcy.

Peace with France in 1598 and England in 1604 meant that Spain could focus her energies on restoring her rule to the Dutch provinces. The Dutch, led by Maurice of Nassau, the son of William the Silent, had succeeded in taking a number of border cities since 1590, including the fortress of Breda. Following the peace with England, the new Spanish commander Ambrogio Spinola pressed hard against the Dutch. Spinola, a general of abilities to match Maurice, was prevented from conquering the Netherlands only by Spain's renewed bankruptcy in 1607. Fortunately, Spanish forces had regained enough of the military initiative to convince a politically divided United Provinces to sign a Twelve Years' Truce in 1609.

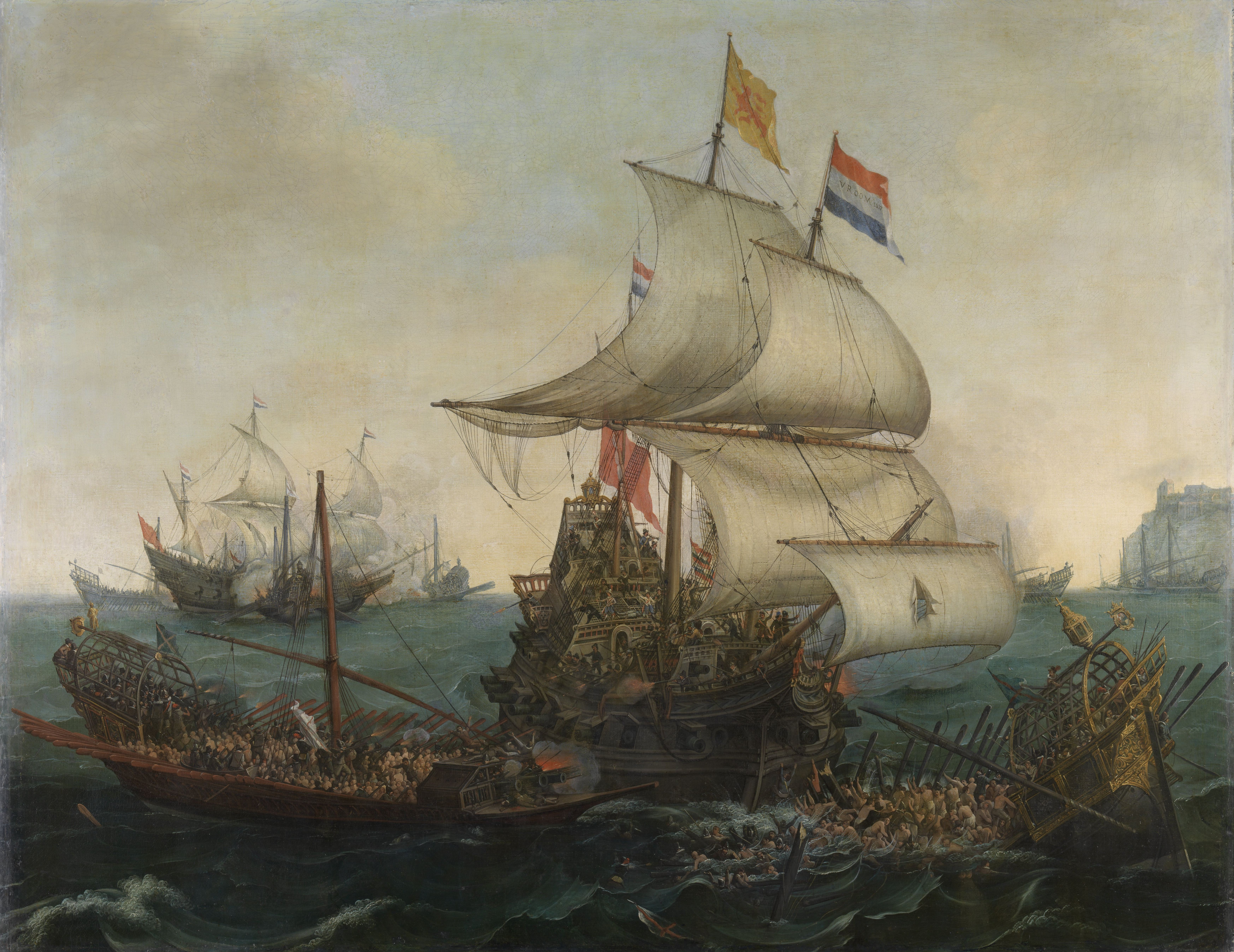
Dutch ships ramming Spanish galleys in the Battle of the Narrow Seas during the Eighty Years' War, October 1602

Spain recovered during the truce, ordering her finances and doing much to restore her prestige and stability in the run-up to the last war in which she would participate as the leading power. In the Spanish Netherlands, the rule of Philip II's daughter, Isabella Clara Eugenia, and her husband, Archduke Albert, restored stability. But Philip III and Lerma lacked the ability to make any meaningful change in the country's foreign policy. They clung to the idea of placing the Infanta Isabella on the English throne after Queen Elizabeth I's death and sent a limited expeditionary force to Ireland to aid the Spanish-supplied rebels. The English defeated it, but the long war of attrition there had drained England of money, men, and morale: Elizabeth's successor, James I, wanted a fresh start to his reign. The war that had been going on between the two countries since 1585 finally ended. War with France threatened in 1610, but shortly after, Henry IV was assassinated, and the regency of the boy king Louis XIII was not stable. Up until 1630, Spain was at peace and continued its dominant position in Europe. Meanwhile, Lerma's enemies expelled him from office in 1617, and Baltasar de Zúñiga began calling for a more aggressive foreign policy.

In 1618, beginning with the Defenestration of Prague, Austria and Ferdinand II, Holy Roman Emperor, embarked on a campaign against the Protestant Union and Bohemian Revolt. Zúñiga encouraged Philip to join the Austrian Habsburgs in the war, and Ambrogio Spinola, the rising star of the Spanish army, was sent at the head of the Army of Flanders to intervene. Thus, Spain entered into the Thirty Years' War.

=== Philip IV ===
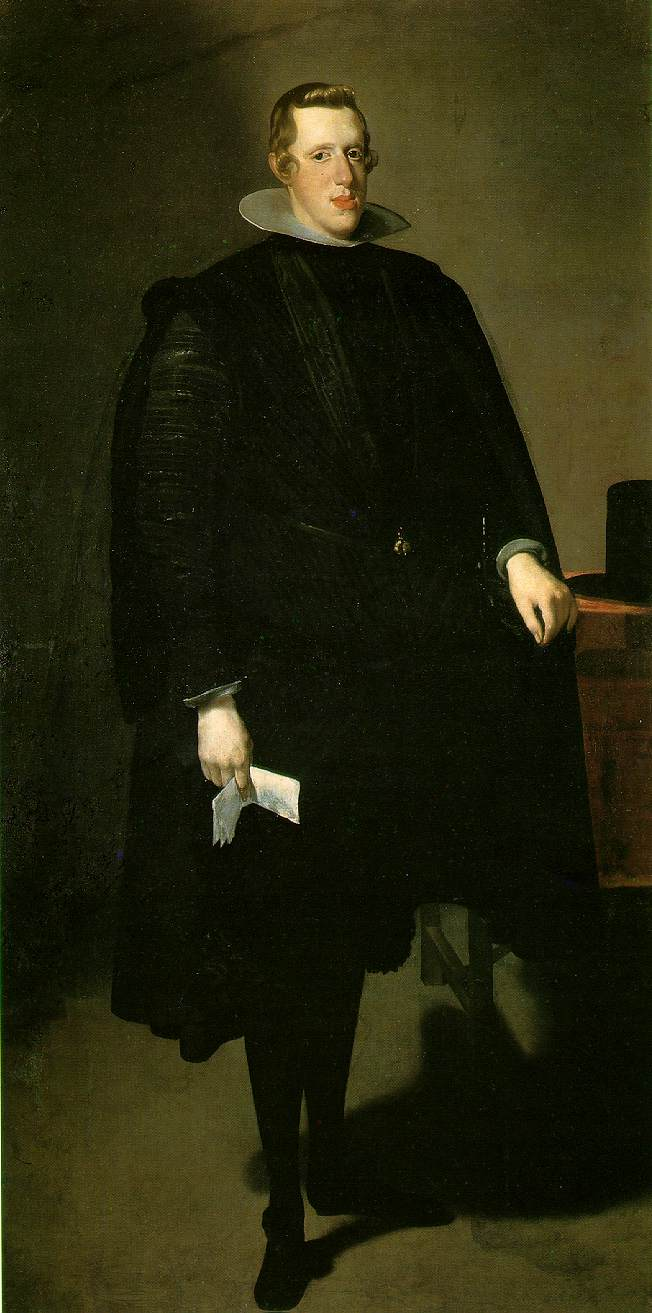
King Philip IV of Spain (r. 1621–1665) by Diego Velázquez

In 1621, Philip III died and his son succeeded as Philip IV. The militarists now were firmly in charge. The following year, Zúñiga was replaced by Gaspar de Guzmán, Count-Duke of Olivares, an able man who believed that the center of all Spain's woes lay in Holland. After certain initial setbacks, the Bohemians were defeated at White Mountain in 1621, and again at Stadtlohn in 1623. The war with the Netherlands was renewed with Spinola taking the fortress of Breda in 1625. The intervention of the Danish king Christian IV in the war worried some, because Christian was one of Europe's few monarchs who had no worries over his finances. However, the victory of the Imperial general Albert of Wallenstein over the Danes at Dessau Bridge and again at Lutter, both in 1626, eliminated the threat. There was hope in Madrid that the Netherlands might finally be reincorporated into the empire, and after the defeat of Denmark the Protestants in Germany seemed subdued. France was once again involved in her own instabilities and the famous Siege of La Rochelle began in 1627. Spain's eminence seemed irrefutable. The Count-Duke Olivares stridently affirmed "God is Spanish and fights for our nation these days."

Olivares was a man out of his time. He realized that Spain needed to reform and to reform it needed peace. The destruction of the United Provinces of the Netherlands was necessary. Dutch colonial policy tried to undermine Spanish and Portuguese hegemony. Spinola and the Spanish army were focused on the Netherlands, and the war seemed to be going in Spain's favor.

In 1627, the Castilian economy collapsed. The Spanish had been debasing their currency to pay for the war and prices exploded in Spain just as they had in previous years in Austria. Until 1631, parts of Castile operated on a barter economy as a result of the currency crisis, and the government was unable to collect any meaningful taxes from the peasantry, depending instead on its colonies (via the Spanish treasure fleet). The Spanish armies in Germany resorted to "paying themselves" on the land. Olivares, who had backed certain tax measures in Spain pending the completion of the war, was further blamed for the fruitless War of the Mantuan Succession in Italy. The Dutch, who during the Twelve Years' Truce had made their navy a priority, proceeded to plunder Spanish and (especially) Portuguese maritime trade, on which Spain was wholly dependent after the economic collapse. Spanish victories in Germany and Italy were not enough to matter, and their navy began suffering losses.

In 1630, Gustavus Adolphus of Sweden landed in Germany and relieved the port of Stralsund that was the last stronghold on the continent held by German forces belligerent to the Emperor. Gustav then marched south winning notable victories at Breitenfeld and Lutzen, attracting greater support for the Protestant cause the further he went. The situation for the Catholics improved with Gustav's death at Lutzen in 1632 and a shocking victory for Imperial forces under Cardinal-Infante Ferdinand and Ferdinand III of Hungary at Nordlingen in 1634. From a position of strength, the Emperor approached the war-weary German states with a peace in 1635. Many accepted, including the two most powerful, Brandenburg-Prussia and Saxony.

Cardinal Richelieu had been a strong supporter of the Dutch and Protestants since the beginning of the war, sending funds and equipment in an attempt to stem Habsburg strength in Europe. Richelieu decided that the recently signed Peace of Prague was contrary to French interests and declared war on the Holy Roman Emperor and Spain within months of the peace being signed. The more experienced Spanish forces scored initial successes. Olivares ordered a lightning campaign into northern France from the Spanish Netherlands, hoping to shatter the resolve of King Louis XIII's ministers and topple Richelieu before the war exhausted Spanish finances and France's military resources could be fully deployed. In the "année de Corbie", 1636, Spanish forces advanced as far south as Amiens and Corbie, threatening Paris and quite nearly ending the war on their terms.

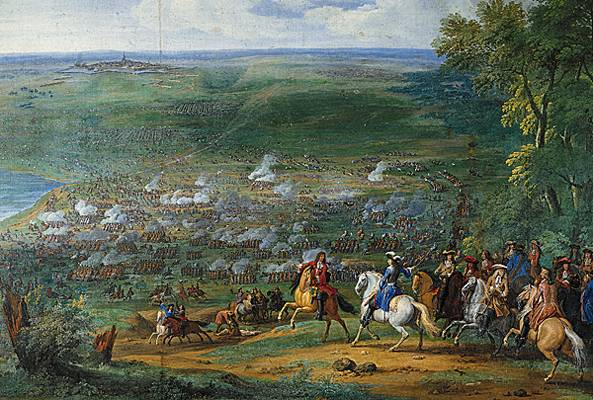
The Battle of Rocroi (1643), the symbolic end of the greatness of Spain

After 1636, however, Olivares stopped the advance. The French thus gained time to properly mobilise. At the Battle of the Downs in 1639 a Spanish fleet was destroyed by the Dutch States Navy, and the Spanish found themselves unable to adequately reinforce and supply their forces in the Netherlands. The Spanish Army of Flanders, which represented the finest of Spanish soldiery and leadership, faced a French advance led by Louis, Grand Condé in northern France at Rocroi in 1643. The Spanish, led by Francisco de Melo, were routed. One of Spain's best and most famous armies had suffered defeat on the battlefield and the waning power of Spain was eclipsed by that of France.

=== The last Spanish Habsburgs (1643–1700) ===
Burdened by wartime taxes and supported by the French, the Catalans, Portuguese and Neapolitans rose up in revolt against the Spanish in the 1640s. With the Spanish Netherlands now very much on the defensive between French and Dutch forces after the Battle of Lens in 1648, the Spanish made peace with the Dutch and recognized the independent United Provinces in the Peace of Westphalia that ended both the Eighty Years' War and the Thirty Years' War.

Olivares attempted to suppress the Catalan Revolt by launching an invasion of southern France. The quartering of Spanish troops in the Principality of Catalonia only made the situation worse. The Catalans decided to secede from Spain altogether and unite with France. French troops soon arrived in Catalonia, but when a renewed civil war (The Fronde) broke out at home, their domestically distracted forces were driven out in 1652 by Catalan and Spanish Habsburg forces.

England now entered the war and occupied Jamaica. The long, desultory and weary struggle effectively ended at the Battle of the Dunes (1658) where the French army under Henri de La Tour d'Auvergne, Viscount of Turenne (along with some English help) defeated the Spanish Army of Flanders. Spain agreed to the Treaty of the Pyrenees in 1659 that ceded to France Artois, Roussillon, and portions of Lorraine.

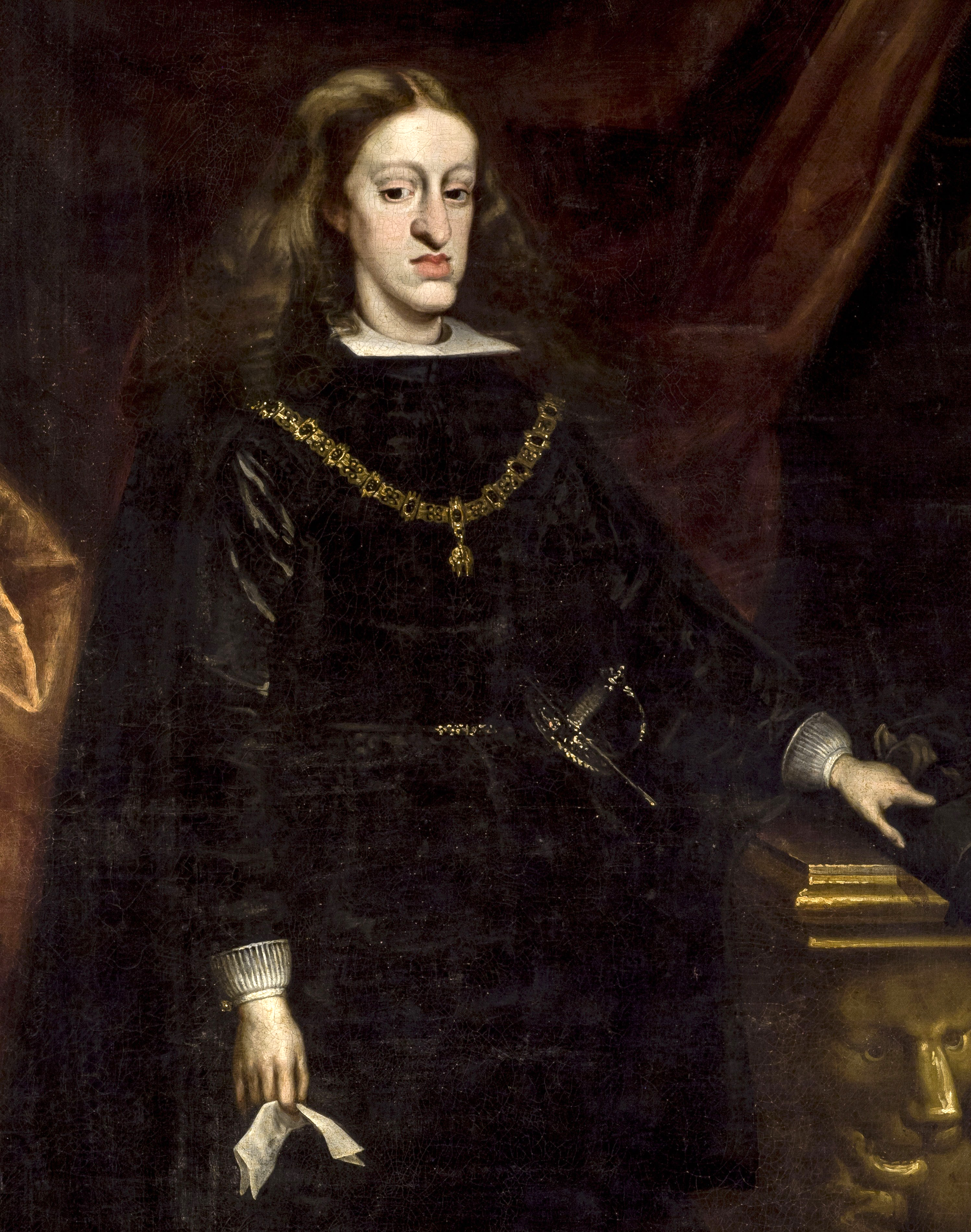
Charles II, the last Habsburg king of Spain (r. 1665–1700)

Meanwhile, the Portuguese took advantage of the Catalan revolt to declare their own independence in 1640. The 60 years of union between Portugal and Spain were not happy. The Portuguese fluent Philip II visited the country twice, but Philip III only once, in a short formal visit. Philip IV never bothered to. The Spanish, hard pressed elsewhere, were blamed for inadequately protecting Portugal's overseas colonies from the Dutch who annexed parts of Colonial Brazil. In a time of economic downturn, the Spanish colonies did not enjoy having to trade and compete with their Portuguese counterparts. Moreover, Portugal's autonomous status as an equal in the union went into decline after Philip II and was treated increasingly in the great councils of state as a province. After Portugal declared independence and chose the Duke of Braganza as King John IV, Spain was distracted with a revolt in Andalusia and thus was unable to do anything about it.

The Portuguese Revolt was partially what led Spain to conclude peace with France in 1659. But the government had gone bankrupt again in 1647 and 1653, and the nobility would not give an inch on financial and tax reforms. Portuguese victories in 1663 at Ameixial and in 1665 at Montes Claros secured their independence. Spain finally recognized Portugal's sovereignty in the Treaty of Lisbon (1668).

Philip IV, who had seen over the course of his life the declining influence of Spain's empire, sank slowly into depression after he had to dismiss his favorite courtier, Olivares, in 1643. In 1646, his eldest son and heir Balthasar Charles, Prince of Asturias died at the age of 16. Charles II suffered from generations of Habsburg inbreeding and was physically and mentally incapable of governing, being manipulated by various political factions throughout his life. For a short time under Don Juan José de Austria, illegitimate son of Philip IV, as valido the nobility came to dominate Spain once again. Most were self-serving, but there were a few such as Manuel Joaquín Álvarez de Toledo, Count of Oropesa, who managed to stabilize the currency, despite ruinous deflation. Others tried to weaken the power of the Spanish Inquisition, which however was not abolished until 1808, and encourage economic development.

Even so, Spain's economy declined, especially in Castile, and its population decreased by nearly two million people during the 17th century. This was partially due to plague outbreaks, and partially due to the huge casualties caused by almost continuous warfare. The period 1677–1686 was a low point, with famine, plague, natural disasters, and economic upheaval. Emigration to the New World increased.

France was now strong and united under Louis XIV and after the Treaty of the Pyrenees (1659) took Spain's place as the dominant power in Europe. Three wars were fought during this period, the War of Devolution (1667–1668), the Franco-Dutch War (1672–1678), and the War of the Grand Alliance (1688–1697). Although Spain's territorial losses (the Franche-Comté, some towns in the Southern Netherlands and part of the island of Hispaniola) were relatively few, it had demonstrated some vulnerability.

=== War of the Spanish Succession ===
Charles II was childless and it was clear that he would produce no children and so the Habsburg line in Spain would die with him. Louis XIV and other European rulers had plans for when Charles II's death came, as it did at the age of 39 on 1 November 1700. Charles had named as his heir Philip of Anjou, a grandson of Louis XIV, whose claim was backed by France and most of the high Spanish nobility. Philip had a Habsburg rival, Archduke Charles, who was supported by the Grand Alliance, whose primary members included Austria, the Dutch Republic, and Great Britain as well as significant parts of Aragon. The War of the Spanish Succession was fought both in Spain and outside between the great powers between 1701 and 1714.

Although outside Aragonese lands there was insufficient popular support to hold inland areas, the allies did manage to hold land for the Hapsburg claimant until accepting the Bourbon claim at the Treaty of Utrecht. Under the Treaty of Rastatt the Hapsburg claimant, now also Holy Roman Emperor accepted the Bourbon claim in return for the Spanish Netherlands and Spanish possessions in Italy, so ending the Hapsburg pursuit of their claim to Spain.

== Religion and the Spanish Inquisition ==
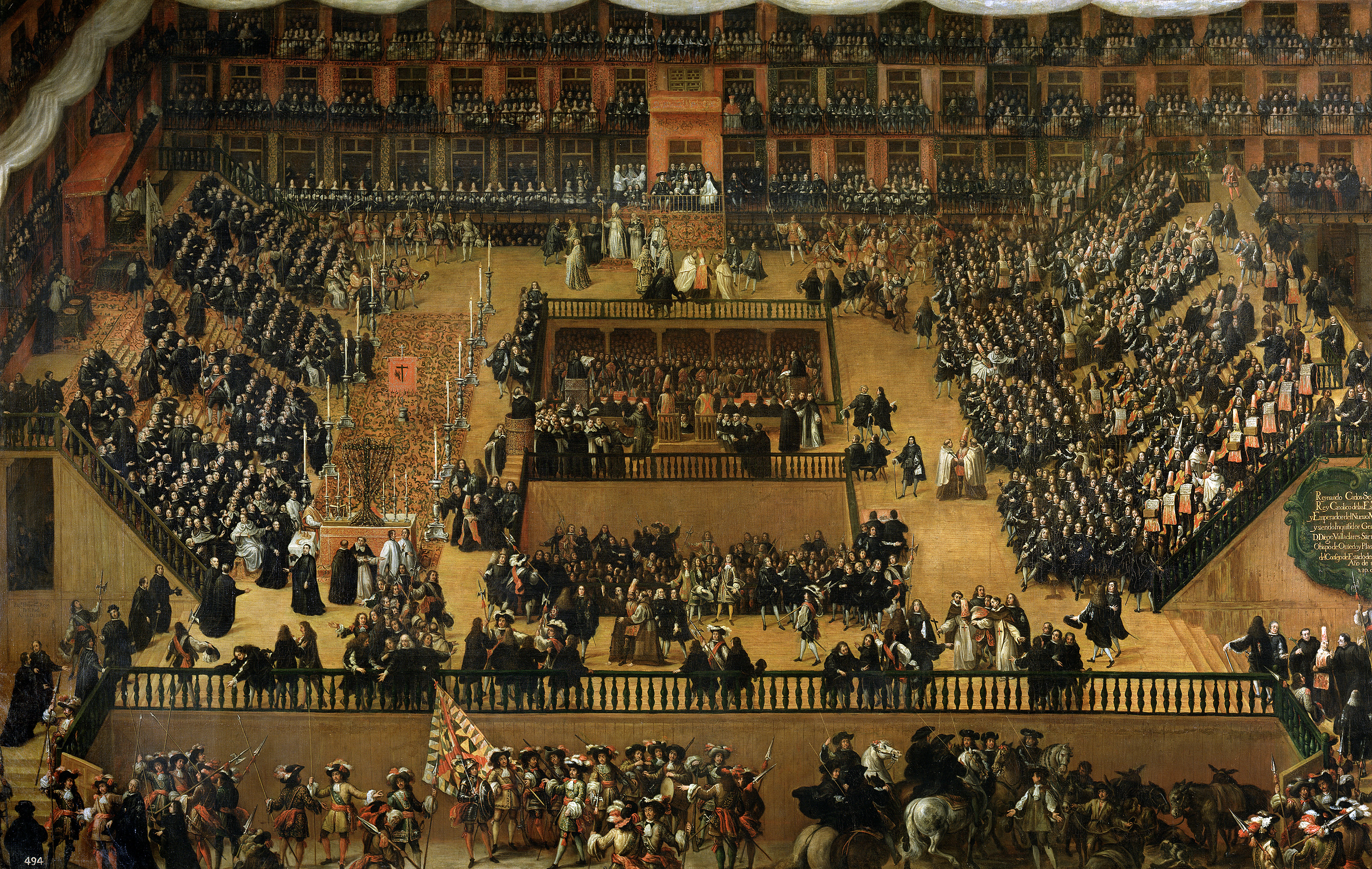
An auto-da-fé, painted by Francisco Rizi, 1683

The Spanish Inquisition was formally launched during the reign of the Catholic Monarchs, continued by their Habsburg successors, and only ended in the 19th century. Under Charles I, the Inquisition became a formal department in the Spanish government, hurtling out of control as the 16th century progressed.

Philip II greatly expanded the Inquisition and made church orthodoxy a goal of public policy. In 1559, three years after Philip came to power, students in Spain were forbidden to travel abroad, the leaders of the Inquisition were placed in charge of censorship, and books could no longer be imported. Philip vigorously tried to excise Protestantism from Spain, holding innumerable campaigns to eliminate Lutheran and Calvinist literature from the country, hoping to avoid the chaos taking place in France.

Philip was more religious than his father, and was convinced that if the Protestants were resorting to military force, then he must do likewise. He was willing to do whatever it took to fight the heretics and preserve Spanish hegemony, even intervening in papal conclaves to ensure the choosing of a pro-Spanish pope. Philip succeeded three times with popes Urban VII, Gregory XIV, and Innocent IX. But the fourth time, he failed to prevent the election of the pro-French Clement VIII.

The Catholic Church in Spain had been purged of many of its administrative excesses in the 15th century by Cardinal Francisco Ximénez de Cisneros. The Inquisition served to expurgate many of the more radical reformers who sought to change church theology as the Protestant reformers wanted. Instead, Spain became the scion of the Counter-Reformation as it emerged from the Reconquista. Spain bred two unique threads of counter-reformationary thought in the persons of Saint Theresa of Avila and the Basque Ignatius Loyola. Theresa advocated strict monasticism and a revival of more ancient traditions of penitence. She experienced a mystical ecstasy that became profoundly influential on Spanish culture and art. Ignatius Loyola, founder of the Jesuit Order, was influential across the world in his stress on spiritual and mental excellence and contributed to a resurgence of learning across Europe. In 1625, a peak of Spanish prestige and power, the Count-Duke of Olivares established the Jesuit Colegio Imperial de Madrid to train Spanish nobles in the humanities and military arts.

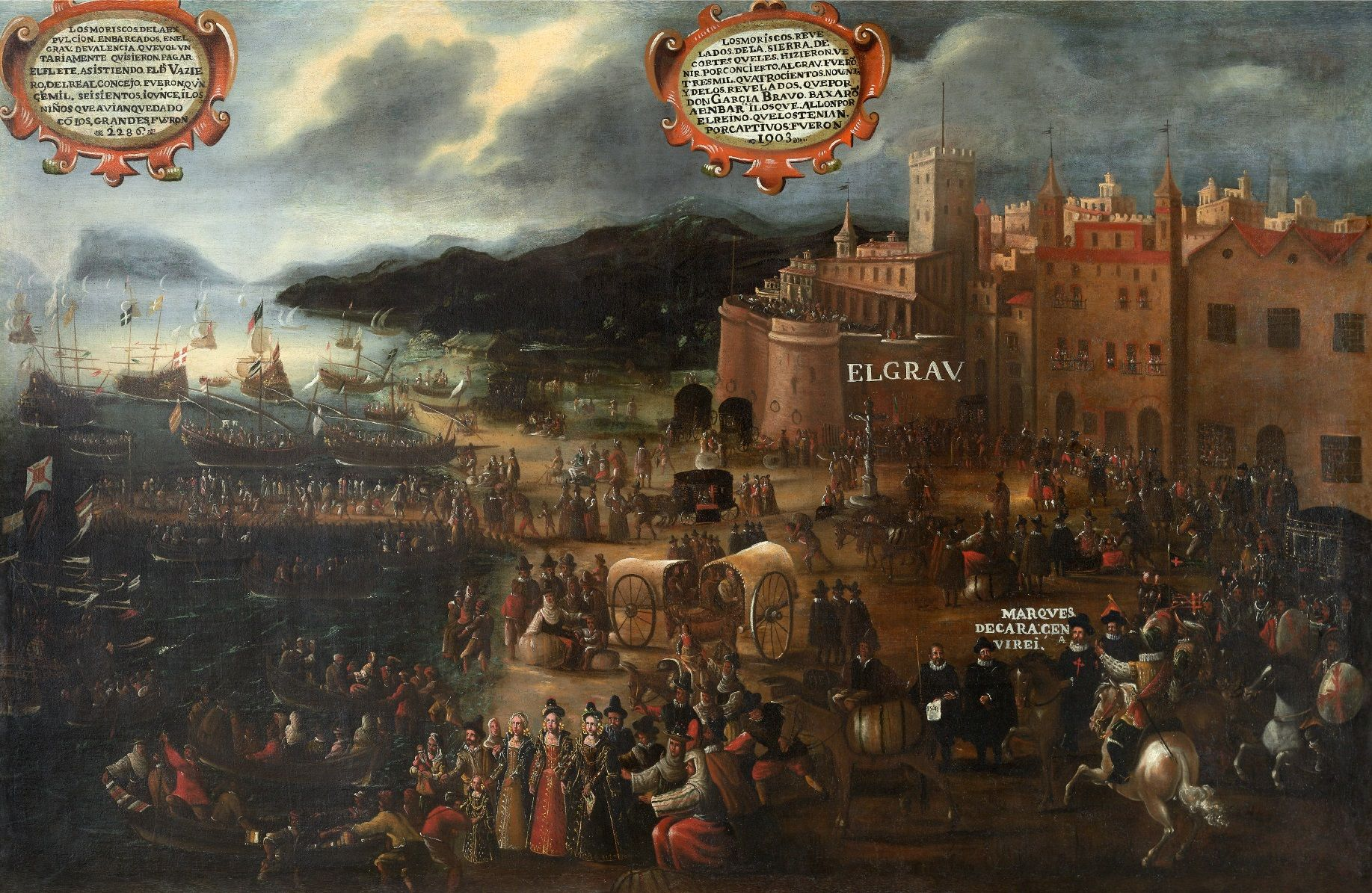
The expulsion of the Moriscos from Valencia

The Moriscos of southern Spain had been forcibly converted to Christianity in 1502, but under the rule of Charles I they had been able to obtain a degree of tolerance from their Christian rulers. They were allowed to practice their former custom, dress, and language, and religious laws were laxly enforced. However, Charles also passed the Limpieza de sangre, a law that excluded those not of pure Old Christian, non-Jewish blood from public office. Philip began to put back into place the restrictive laws of generations before and in 1568 the Moriscos rebelled. The revolt was only put down by Italian troops under Don John of Austria. Even then the Moriscos retreated to the highlands and were not defeated until 1570. The revolt was followed by a massive resettlement program in which 12,000 Christian peasants replaced the Moriscos. In 1609, on the advice of the Duke of Lerma, Philip III expelled the 300,000 Moriscos of Spain.

The expulsion of the industrious Jews, Moors, and Moriscos did nothing to advance the Spanish economy. The small scattered groups of Moriscos lived largely by subsistence farming in marginal mountain areas or by unskilled laboring in a country that had very many underemployed hands. A council set up to investigate the matter in Castile found little effect, but in parts of Aragon and especially the Kingdom of Valencia, where half the Moriscos had lived, and had made up a substantial minority of the population, the impact was certainly noticeable for the noblemen who had lost rents.

== Administration and bureaucracy ==
The Spanish received a large influx of gold from the colonies in the New World as plunder when they were conquered, much of which Charles I used to prosecute his wars in Europe. In the 1520s silver began to be extracted from the rich deposits at Guanajuato, but it was not until the 1540s, with the opening of the mines at Potosí and Zacatecas, that silver was to become the fabled source of wealth it has assumed in legend. The Spanish left mining to private enterprise but instituted a tax known as the Royal fifth whereby a fifth of the metal was collected by the government. They were quite successful in enforcing the tax throughout their vast empire in the New World. All bullion had to pass through the House of Trade in Seville, under the direction of the Council of the Indies. The supply of Almadén mercury, vital to extracting silver from the ore, was controlled by the state and contributed to the rigor of Spanish tax policy.

Inflation, both in Spain and in the rest of Europe, was primarily caused by debt, but a level of debt made possible later by the rising silver imports. Charles had conducted most of his wars on credit. In 1557, a year after he abdicated, Spain was forced into its first debt moratorium, setting a pattern that would be repeated with ever more disruptive economic consequences.

Few Spaniards initially gave a thought to the wholesale slaughter, enslavement, and forced conversion of Native Americans either, although some men such as Bartolomé de las Casas argued for more humane treatment of them. This led to much debate and governmental action. The Laws of Burgos, the New Laws, and other legal and institutional changes somewhat alleviated conditions for Native Americans, including the freeing of all Native American slaves.

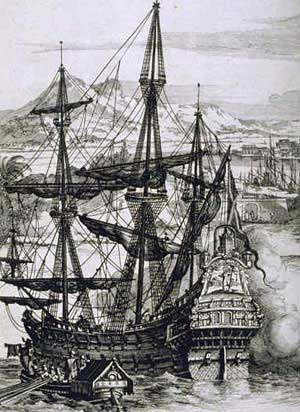
A Spanish galleon, the symbol of Spain's maritime empire

Faced with the growing threat of piracy, in 1564 the Spanish adopted a convoy system far ahead of its time, with treasure fleets leaving America in April and August. The policy proved efficient, and was quite successful. Only two convoys were captured: one in 1628 when it was captured by the Dutch, and another in 1656, captured by the English, but by then the convoys were a shadow of what they had been at their peak at the end of the previous century. Nevertheless, even without being completely captured they frequently came under attack, which inevitably took its toll. Not all shipping of the dispersed empire could be protected by large convoys, allowing the Dutch, English and French privateers and pirates the opportunity to attack trade along the American and Spanish coastlines and raid isolated settlements. This became particularly savage from the 1650s, with all sides falling to extraordinary levels of barbarity, even by the harsh standards of the time. Spain also responded with no small amount of privateering, using the recaptured city of Dunkirk as a base for its Dunkirk Raiders to molest Dutch, English and French trade. More seriously, the Portuguese part of the empire, with its chronically undermanned African and Asian forts, proved nearly impossible to defend adequately, and with Spain so fully engaged on so many fronts, it could spare little for their defense. Spain also had to deal with Ottoman backed Barbary pirates in the Mediterranean, a vastly greater menace than Caribbean piracy, as well as Oriental and Dutch piracy in the waters around the Philippines.

The growth of Spain's empire in the New World was accomplished from Seville, without the close direction of the leadership in Madrid. Charles I and Philip II were primarily concerned with their duties in Europe, and thus control of the Americas was handled by viceroys and colonial administrators who operated with virtual autonomy. The Habsburg kings regarded their colonies as feudal associations rather than integral parts of Spain. No Spanish king ever visited the new world. The Habsburgs, whose family had traditionally ruled over diverse, non-contiguous domains and had been forced to devolve autonomy to local administrators, replicated and continued those feudal policies in Spain, with the Basques, the Crown of Aragon and each of its constituent kingdoms retaining their Fuero rights.

This meant that taxes, infrastructure improvement, and internal trade policy were defined independently by each territory, leading to many internal customs barriers and tolls, and conflicting policies even within the Habsburg domains. Charles I and Philip II had been able to master the various courts through their impressive political energy, but the much weaker Philip III and IV allowed it to decay. At the end, Charles II was incapable of controlling anything at all. The development of Spain itself was hampered by the fact that Charles I and Philip II spent most of their time abroad. For most of the 16th century, Spain was administered from Brussels and Antwerp. It was only during the Dutch Revolt that Philip returned to Spain, where he spent most of his time in the seclusion of the monastic palace of El Escorial. The empire, held together by a determined king keeping the bureaucracy together, experienced a setback when a less-trusting ruler came to the throne. Philip II distrusted the nobility and discouraged any independent initiative among them. While writers of the time offered novel solutions to Spain's problems such as using irrigation in agriculture and encouragement of economic activity, the nobility never really produced anyone that could bring about serious reforms.

Charles I, on becoming king, clashed with his nobles during the Castilian War of the Communities when he attempted to fill government positions with effective Dutch and Flemish officials. Philip II encountered major resistance when he tried to enforce his authority over the Netherlands, contributing to the rebellion in that country. The Count-Duke of Olivares, Philip IV's chief minister, always regarded it as essential to Spain's survival that the bureaucracy be centralized. He even backed the full union of Portugal with Spain, though he never had an opportunity to realize his ideas. The bureaucracy became so increasingly bloated and corrupt that by the time of Olivares's dismissal in 1643, its deterioration had rendered it largely ineffective.

=== Relationship with Austrian Habsburgs ===
The territories of the Archduchy of Austria, the Kingdom of Bohemia, and the Kingdom of Hungary of the Habsburg monarchy were deeply integrated into a sophisticated network of high-level diplomatic lobbying (part of the broader power projection system of the Spanish Empire), aligning them with Madrid's political agenda through the integration of Spanish advisors (acting as ambassadors of the King of Spain) into the Reichsrat in Vienna and the Hungarian Diets. There, they frequently participated in political decisions and even had direct access to classified documents, international treaties, and state secrets (acting as de facto viceroys of the Spanish Habsburgs as the senior branch of the House of Habsburg at the time), and managing to sanction key inner political decisions in benefit of Spain, such as the Treaty of Oñate (in which the candidature of Ferdinand II as Holy Roman Emperor had to be consulted with Philip III of Spain, giving him Concessions in Alsace, Ortenau and Italy). This ensured that the long-term geopolitical interests of Spain were secured in local decision-making bodies, in which the Austrian Habsburgs (and indirectly the Holy Roman Empire) functioned very much as a junior partner very dependent to the Hispanic Monarchy from the mid-16th century until the mid-17th century, as Austrians relied heavily on Spanish money, military power, and geopolitical strategy to survive during existential crisis like the Religious wars in Europe or the Ottoman wars (becoming Madrid the undisputed center of gravity for the Habsburg Monarchy at the time).

The climax of this sphere of influence occurred during the Thirty Years' War, despite its fading military and financial dominance, when alliances were cultivated with prominent Czech noble families (such as the Slavata and Martiniz families) and the Croatian-Hungarian aristocracy (the Forgách, Pázmány, and Zrínyi families). This ensured that Spain's long-term geopolitical interests in Central Europe were secured within local decision-making bodies, even leading to signs of assimilation of Spanish culture as a result of the constant migration of influential figures—including soldiers, diplomats, and aristocrats—who moved dynamically between Spanish and Central European political centers (consuming hundreds of books by Spanish authors of the School of Salamanca in the process, as also collected Spanish goods and regularly exchanged diplomatic gifts and even traditions with their Spanish counterparts). Also, Spain provided benefits to their Austrian counterparts by sharing information relating to the New World for Scientific and Economic purposes (the Spanish treasury frequently subsidized the Austrian branch with American silver and gold), giving free pass to Latin America for many Catholic missionaries from the Habsburg monarchy (mainly Jesuits from the Lands of the Bohemian Crown) and experiencing firstly the benefits of the Columbian exchange unlike any other European Monarchy at the time due to the Spanish trade privileges (like not having so much restrictions to participate in the Transatlantic commerce in Seville).

== Economy ==
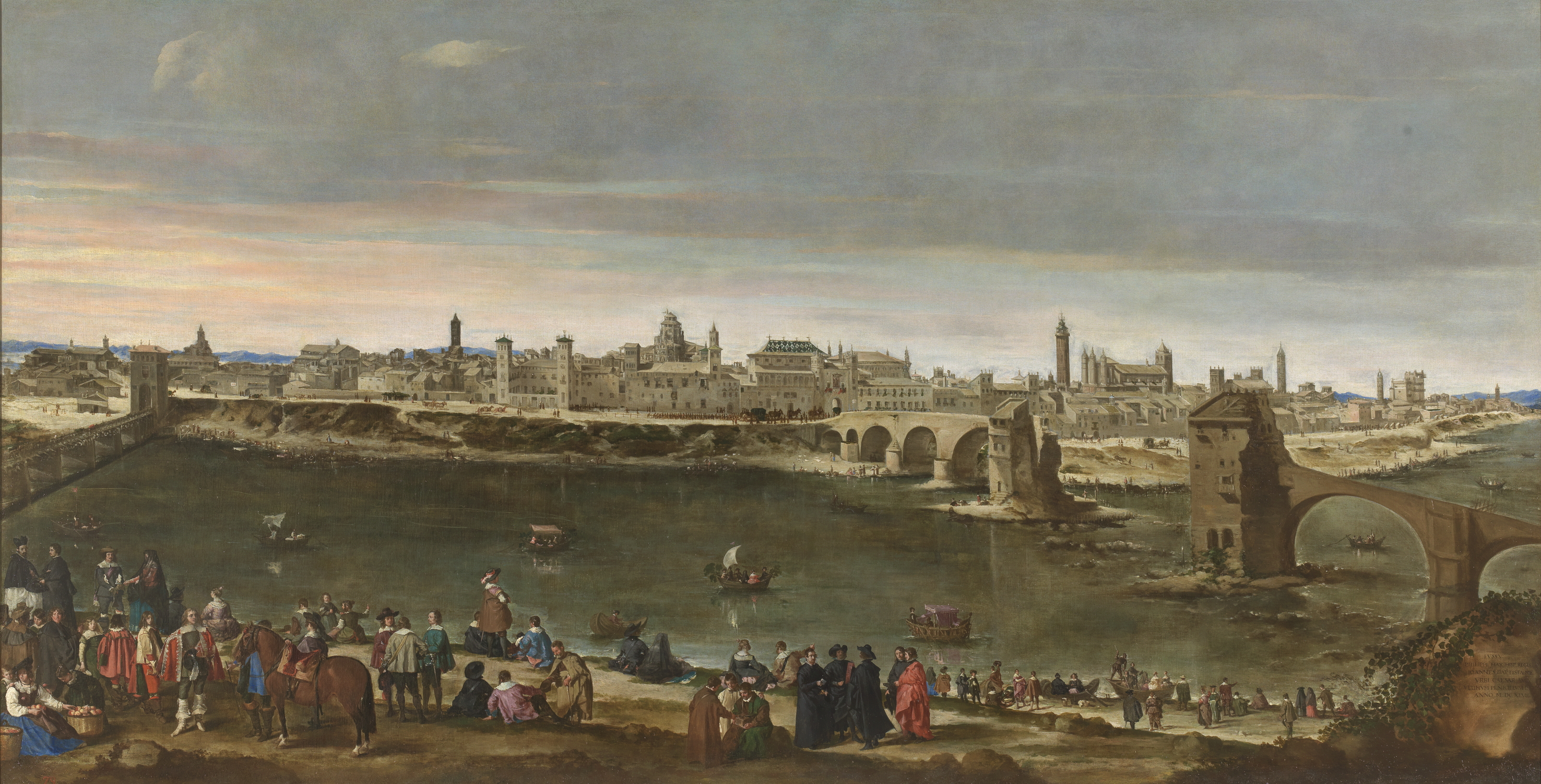
View of Zaragoza, 1647, by Juan Bautista Martínez del Mazo

Like most of Europe, Spain had suffered from famine and plague during the 14th and 15th centuries. By 1500, Europe was beginning to emerge from these demographic disasters, and populations began to explode. Seville, which was home to 60,000 people in 1500 burgeoned to 150,000 by the end of the century. There was a substantial movement to the cities of Spain to capitalize on new opportunities as shipbuilders and merchants to service Spain's impressive and growing empire. The 16th century was a time of development in Spain as both agriculture and trade burgeoned. Throughout the harsh interior of Castile grain and wool production grew. The former fed an expansion of the population. The latter fed both local textile manufacturing and a lucrative trade with the Netherlands. The Castilian cities of Burgos, Segovia, Cuenca and Toledo, flourished with the expansion of the textile and metallurgical industries. Santander, on the northern Atlantic coast, grew in wealth from its traditional roles as a port linking the country's interior with Northern Europe and as a ship building centre. Southern cities like Cádiz and Seville expanded rapidly from the commerce and shipbuilding spurred on by the demands of the American colonies and enjoyed a monopoly on trade with Spanish America. Barcelona, already one of Europe's most important and sophisticated trading port cities in the Middle Ages, continued to develop. By 1590, Spain's population was far greater than what it had been in any previous period. It was during this last decade when Castile began to suffer crop failures and was struck by a plague from 1596 that brought about the first serious reversal in population numbers, a cycle that would repeat itself a number of times in different parts of the country through the 17th century. (Note: The plague arrived by ship at Santander in 1596, presumably from a plague afflicted northwestern Europe. It then spread south along the main routes through the centre of Castile, reaching Madrid in 1599 and Seville by 1600. It finally petered out in Seville's hinterland in 1602.)

As the 16th century had worn on, inflation in Spain triggered hardship for the peasantry. it was a result of state debt and, more importantly, the importation of silver and gold from the New World. The average cost of goods quintupled in the 16th century in Spain, led by wool and grain. While reasonable when compared to the 20th century, prices in the 15th century changed very little, and the European economy was shaken by the so-called price revolution. Spain, which along with England was Europe's only producer of wool, initially benefited from the rapid growth. However, like in England, there began in Spain an inclosure movement that stifled the growth of food and depopulated whole villages whose residents were forced to move to cities. The higher inflation, the burden of the Habsburgs' wars and the many customs duties dividing the country and restricting trade with the Americas, stifled the growth of industry that may have provided an alternative source of income in the towns. Another factor was the militaristic nature of the Castilian nobility, which had developed during the centuries of the reconquest of the Iberian Peninsula. They preferred careers in the government bureaucracy, the military, or the church, shunning economic activities. This militarism also meant that Spain exhausted its wealth and manpower in near-continuous wars. Under Philip II, these wars had much to do with combating Protestantism, but in the 17th century it became clear that the world that had existed before 1517 could not be restored. Spain's wars during that century became increasingly more to do with preserving the hegemonic power of the Habsburg alliance in Europe. Although the Habsburg alliance was successful in buttressing the Catholic Church against the rise of Protestantism.

Sheep-farming was practiced extensively in Castile, and grew rapidly with rising wool prices with the backing of the king. Merino sheep were annually moved from the mountains of the north to the warmer south every winter, ignoring state-mandated trails that were intended to prevent the sheep from trampling the farmland. Complaints lodged against the shepherds' guild, the Mesta, were ignored by Philip II who received a great deal of revenue from wool. Eventually, overtaxed Castile became barren, and Spain, particularly Castile, became dependent on large imports of grain to make up for crop shortfalls. That, given the cost of transportation and the risk of piracy, made staples far more expensive in Spain than elsewhere. As a result, Spain's population, and especially Castile's, never dense on the generally very dry, rocky, mountainous peninsula, grew much more slowly than France's. By Louis XIV's time (1661–1715), France had a population greater than that of Spain and England combined.

The Harvesters by Pieter Brueghel the Elder

Credit emerged as a widespread tool of Spanish business in the 17th century. The city of Antwerp, in the Spanish Netherlands, lay at the heart of European commerce and its bankers financed most of Charles V's and Philip II's wars on credit. The use of "notes of exchange" became common as Antwerp's banks became increasingly powerful and led to extensive speculation that helped to exaggerate price shifts. Although these trends laid the foundation for the development of capitalism in Spain and Europe as a whole, the total lack of regulation and pervasive corruption meant that small landowners often lost everything with a single stroke of misfortune. Estates in Spain, and especially in Castile, grew progressively larger and the economy became increasingly uncompetitive, particularly during the reigns of Philip III and IV when repeated speculative crises shook Spain.

Since the medieval period the Catholic Church had always been important to the Spanish economy. This importance increased greatly in the reigns of Philip III and IV, who had bouts of intense personal piety and church philanthropy, donating large areas of the country to the Church. The later Habsburgs did nothing to promote the redistribution of land. By the end of Charles II's reign, most of Castile was in the hands of a select few landowners, the largest of which by far was the Church. It has been estimated that at the end of the 17th century the holdings of the Spanish church had expanded to include nearly 20% of Castilian land and that the clergy made up as much as 10% of adult males in Castile. Government policy under the succeeding Bourbon dynasty was directed to steadily reducing the Church's vast holdings, which by then had come to be seen as an impediment to the country's development.

== Art and culture ==
The Spanish Golden Age was a flourishing period of arts and letters in Spain which spanned roughly from 1550 to 1650. Some of the outstanding figures of the period were El Greco, Diego Velázquez, Miguel de Cervantes and Pedro Calderón de la Barca.

El Greco was a Greek painter whose dramatic and expressionistic style was met with puzzlement by his contemporaries but found appreciation in the 20th century. Velázquez's work became a model for 19th century realist and impressionist painters.

Cervantes and de la Barca were both writers. Don Quixote de la Mancha, by Cervantes, is one of the most famous works of the period and probably the best-known piece of Spanish literature of all time. It is a parody of the romantic, chivalric aspects of knighthood and a criticism of contemporary social structures and societal norms. Juana Inés de la Cruz, the last great writer of this golden age, died in New Spain in 1695.

This period also saw a flourishing in intellectual activity, now known as the School of Salamanca, producing thinkers that were studied throughout Europe.

== See also ==
- Habsburg monarchy
- History of Spain
- List of largest empires
- Ottoman–Habsburg wars
- Spanish conquest of the Inca Empire

== Bibliography ==
- Alip, Eufronio Melo (1964). Political and cultural history of the Philippines, Volumes 1–2. Alip & Sons.
- Armstrong, Edward (1902). The Emperor Charles V. New York: The Macmillan Company
- Atiyah, Jeremy (2002). Rough guide to Southeast Asia. Rough Guide. ISBN 978-1-85828-893-2.
- Black, Jeremy (1996). The Cambridge Illustrated Atlas of Warfare: Renaissance to Revolution. Cambridge: Cambridge University Press. ISBN 0-521-47033-1
- Braudel, Fernand (1972). The Mediterranean and the Mediterranean World in the Age of Philip II, trans. Siân Reynolds. New York: Harper & Row. ISBN 0-06-090566-2
- Braudel, Fernand (1992) [1979]. The Perspective of the World. Civilization and Capitalism, 15th-18th Century. Vol. III. Berkeley: University of California. ISBN 0-520-08116-1.
- Brown, J. and Elliott, J. H. (1980). A palace for a king. The Buen Retiro and the Court of Philip IV. New Haven: Yale University Press
- Brown, Jonathan (1998). Painting in Spain: 1500–1700. New Haven: Yale University Press. ISBN 0-300-06472-1
- Dominguez Ortiz, Antonio (1971). The golden age of Spain, 1516–1659. Oxford: Oxford University Press. ISBN 0-297-00405-0
- Edwards, John (2000). The Spain of the Catholic Monarchs, 1474–1520. New York: Blackwell. ISBN 0-631-16165-1
- Frankham, Steve; Alexander, James (2008). Footprint Borneo. Footprint Guides. ISBN 978-1-906098-14-8.
- Harman, Alec (1969). Late Renaissance and Baroque music. New York: Schocken Books.
- Joaquin, Nick (1988). Culture and History: Occasional Notes on the Process of Philippine Becoming. Solar.
- Kamen, Henry (1998). Philip of Spain. New Haven and London: Yale University Press. ISBN 0-300-07800-5
- Kamen, Henry (2003). Empire: How Spain Became a World Power, 1492–1763. New York: HarperCollins. ISBN 0-06-093264-3.
- Kurlansky, Mark (1999). The Basque History of the World. Walker & Company. ISBN 9780802713490.
- Kamen, Henry (2005). Spain 1469–1714. A Society of Conflict (3rd ed.) London and New York: Pearson Longman. ISBN 0-582-78464-6
- McAmis, Robert Day (2002). Malay Muslims: the history and challenge of resurgent Islam in Southeast Asia. Wm. B. Eerdmans Publishing. ISBN 978-0-8028-4945-8.
- Parker, Geoffrey (1997). The Thirty Years' War (2nd ed.). New York: Routledge. ISBN 0-415-12883-8
- Parker, Geoffrey (1972). The Army of Flanders and the Spanish road, 1567–1659; the logistics of Spanish victory and defeat in the Low Countries' Wars.. Cambridge: Cambridge University Press. ISBN 0-521-08462-8
- Parker, Geoffrey (1977). The Dutch revolt. Cambridge: Cambridge University Press. ISBN 0-8014-1136-X
- Parker, Geoffrey (1978). Philip II. Boston: Little, Brown. ISBN 0-316-69080-5.
- Parker, Geoffrey (1997). The General Crisis of the Seventeenth Century. New York: Routledge. ISBN 0-415-16518-0
- Saunders, Graham E. (2002). A History of Brunei. RoutledgeCurzon. ISBN 978-0-7007-1698-2.
- Stradling, R. A. (1988). Philip IV and the Government of Spain. Cambridge: Cambridge University Press. ISBN 0-521-32333-9
- Various (1983). Historia de la literatura espanola. Barcelona: Editorial Ariel
- Gallardo, Alexander (2002), "Spanish Economics in the 16th Century: Theory, Policy, and Practice", Lincoln, NE: Writers Club Press, 2002. ISBN 0-595-26036-5.
- Smith, Preserved (1920). Haskins, Charles Homer (ed.). The Age of the Reformation. American Historical Series. New York: Henry Holt and Company. p. 522. OCLC 403814.
