= Iberian Union =

Union of Castile, Aragon and Portugal, 1580–1640

Iberian Union Unión Ibérica (Spanish) União Ibérica (Portuguese) Unió Ibèrica (Catalan)
- 1580–1640
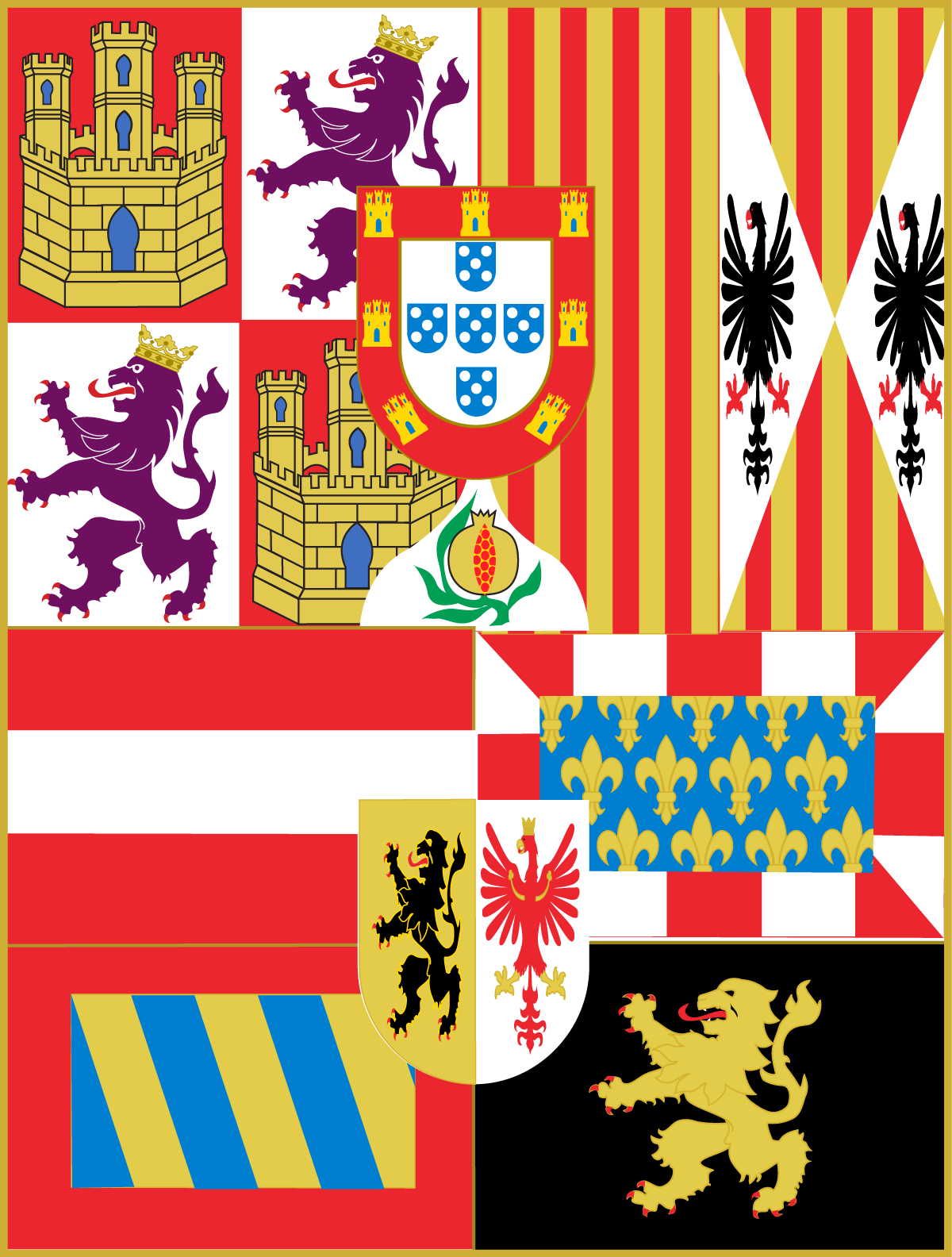
- Royal banner Coat of arms

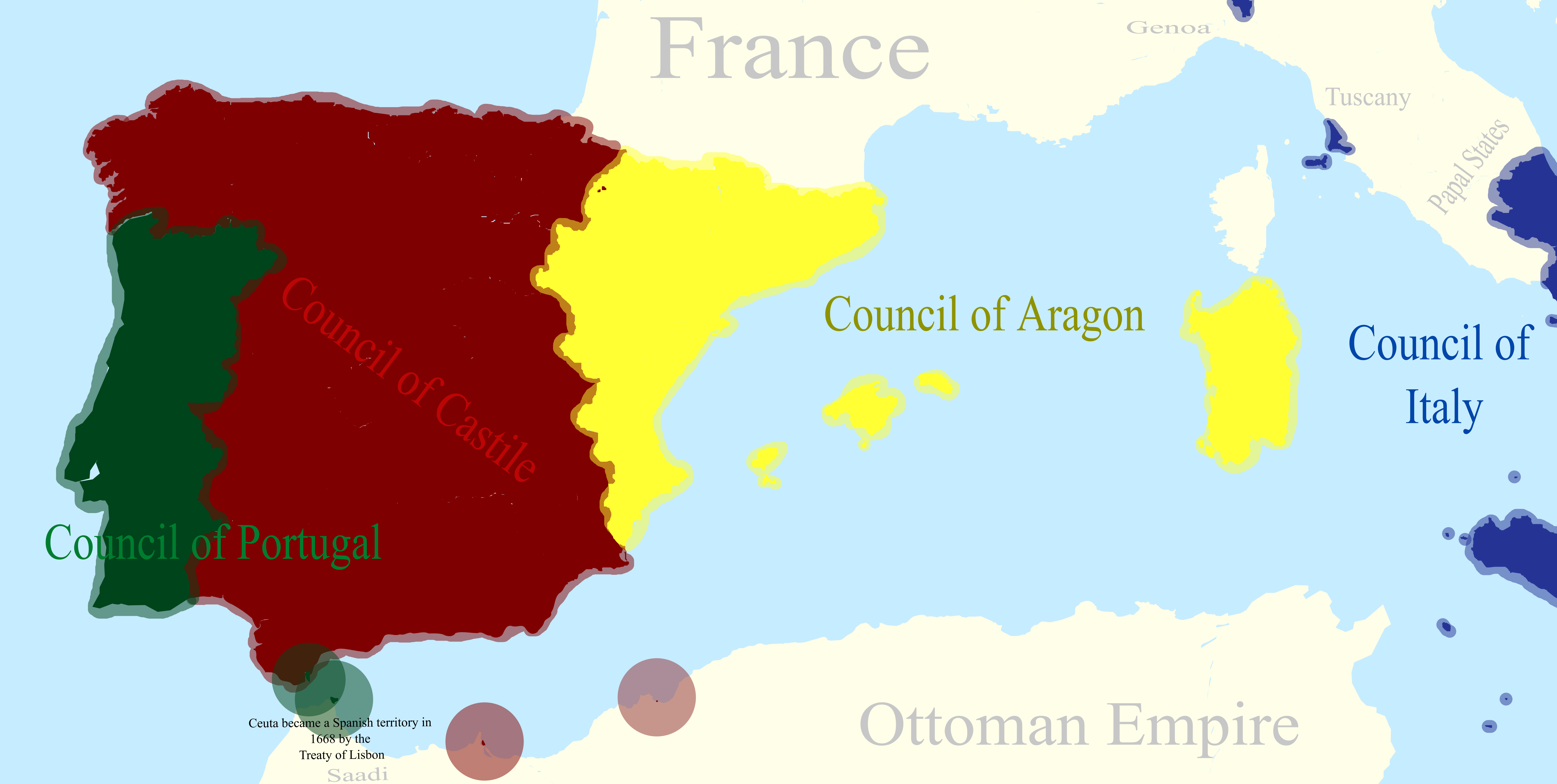
- The Iberian Peninsula with the Councils of the Iberian Union, corresponding with the following realms: Crown of Aragon (Aragon, Catalonia, Majorca, Sardinia, Valencia) Crown of Castile (including Navarre) Kingdom of Portugal

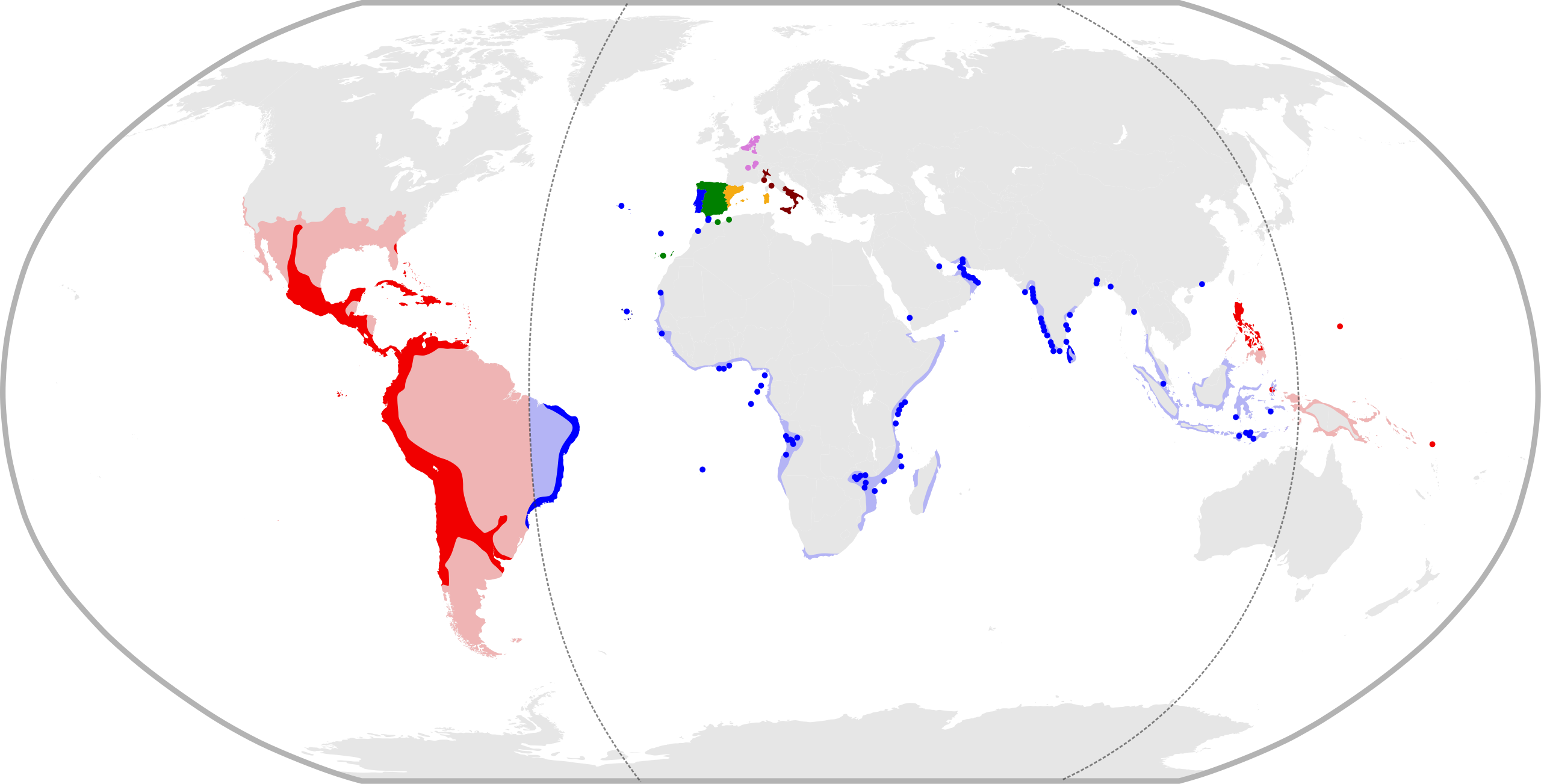
- Map of the Spanish–Portuguese Empire in 1598. Territories administered by the Council of Castile Territories administered by the Council of Aragon Territories administered by the Council of Portugal Territories administered by the Council of Italy Territories administered by the Council of the Indies Territories appointed to the Council of Flanders
- Capital: Madrid (1580–1601, 1606–1640); Valladolid (1601–1606)
- Official languages: Spanish • Catalan • Portuguese
- Religion: Roman Catholic
- Government: Composite monarchy under personal union
- King
  - 1580–1598: Philip II and l
  - 1598–1621: Philip III and II
  - 1621–1640: Philip IV and III
- Legislature: Cortes of Castile; Courts of Aragon; Courts of Catalonia; Courts of Valencia; Cortes of Navarre; Cortes of Portugal
- History
  - War of the Portuguese Succession: 25 August 1580
  - Portuguese Restoration War: 1 December 1640
- Currency: Piece of eight, Spanish real and Portuguese real
Preceded by
Kingdom of Portugal
Crown of Castile
Crown of Aragon
Habsburg Spain
Succeeded by
Kingdom of Portugal
Crown of Castile
Crown of Aragon
Catalan Republic
Habsburg Spain

The Iberian Union, or the Hispanic Monarchy, describes the period from 1580 to 1640 in which the Monarchy of Spain under the Habsburg dynasty, then the personal union of the crowns of Castile and Aragon, brought in personal union also the Kingdom of Portugal. It incorporated the entire Iberian Peninsula, except Andorra and French territory, as well as Portuguese and Spanish overseas possessions, under the Spanish Habsburg monarchs Philip II, Philip III, and Philip IV. The union began after the Portuguese succession crisis of 1580 and the ensuing War of the Portuguese Succession, and lasted until the Portuguese Restoration War, during which the House of Braganza was established as Portugal's new ruling dynasty with the acclamation of John IV as the new king of Portugal.

As a personal union, the Kingdom of Portugal, the Crown of Castile and the states of the Crown of Aragon remained independent states, sharing only a single monarch. The kings from the Spanish branch of the House of Habsburg were the only element that connected the multiple kingdoms and territories, ruled by the six separate government councils of Castile, Aragon, Portugal, Italy, Flanders-Burgundy, and the Indies. For periods, Portugal maintained a viceroy, appointed by the king, although the turnover was often rapid; in the 60 years of the Union, the country had 13 viceroys and four regency councils (see List of viceroys of Portugal). Similar viceroys were appointed in Aragon, Catalonia, Valencia and other kingdoms of the Union. The governments, institutions, and legal traditions of each kingdom remained independent of one another. Alien laws (Leyes de extranjería) determined that a national of one kingdom was a foreigner in all other kingdoms.

Possessing territories in all known continents of the time, the Iberian Union was the most wide-spread empire of the early modern era. The Union led to Portugal's involvement in the Dutch Revolt against Spain. The Dutch Republic in turn saw the union as a justification to start targeting Portuguese colonies and would weaken Portugal's overseas empire in the Orient.

== Background ==
The unification of the peninsula had long been a goal of the region's monarchs with the intent of restoring the Visigothic monarchy. Sancho III of Navarre and Alfonso VII of León and Castile had both taken the title Imperator totius Hispaniae, meaning "Emperor of All Hispania". There were many attempts to unite the different kingdoms after Alfonso VII's death in 1109, especially through a policy of intermarriage. Some of the most famous attempts are those of Miguel da Paz, who would inherit the crowns of Portugal, Leon, Castile, and Aragon, but who died at a young age; and those of Afonso, Prince of Portugal, who was to marry the eldest daughter of the Catholic Monarchs, if not for his untimely death by an accident in which he fell off his horse.

== Establishment ==
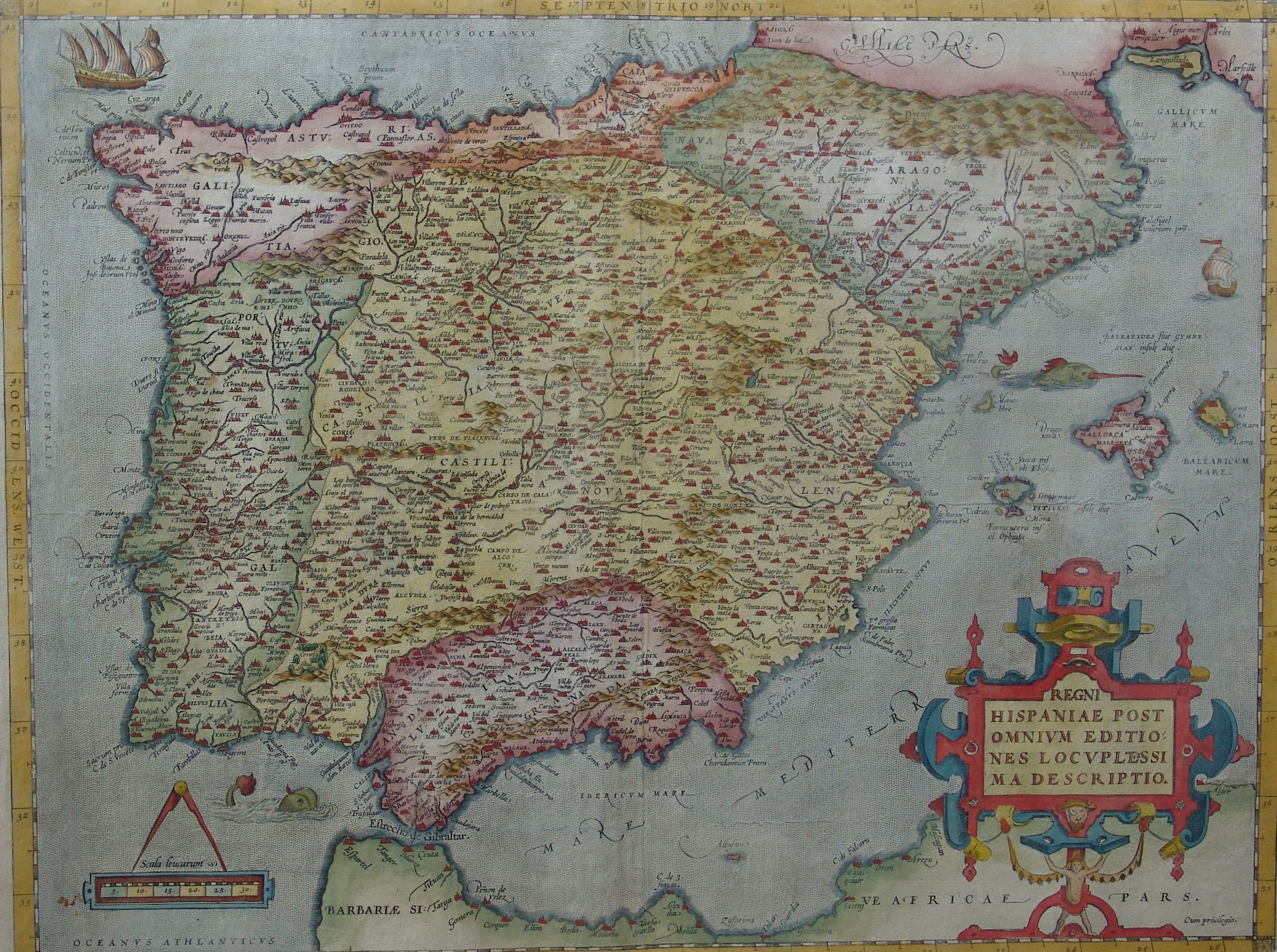
Political map of the Iberian Peninsula in 1570

The Battle of Alcácer Quibir in 1578 saw the death of the young king Sebastian. Sebastian's granduncle and successor, Cardinal Henry, was 66 years old at the time. Henry's death was followed by a succession crisis, with three grandchildren of Manuel I claiming the throne: Infanta Catarina, Duchess of Braganza (married to John, 6th Duke of Braganza), António, Prior of Crato, and King Philip II of Spain. António had been acclaimed king of Portugal by the people of Santarém on 24 July 1580, and then in many cities and towns throughout the country. Some members of the Council of Governors of Portugal who had supported Philip escaped to Spain and declared him to be the legal successor of Henry. Philip marched into Portugal and defeated the troops loyal to the Prior of Crato in the Battle of Alcântara. The troops occupying the countryside (Tercios) commanded by Fernando Álvarez de Toledo, 3rd Duke of Alba arrived in Lisbon. The Duke of Alba imposed on the Portuguese provinces a subjection of Philip before entering Lisbon, where he seized an immense treasure; meanwhile, he allowed his soldiers to sack the vicinity of the capital. Philip was recognized as king by the Cortes of Tomar in 1581, beginning the reign of the House of Habsburg over Portugal. When Philip left in 1583 to Madrid, he made his nephew Albert of Austria his viceroy in Lisbon. In Madrid he established a Council of Portugal to advise him on Portuguese affairs.

António exploited the opportunity that the Anglo-Spanish War (1585–1604) presented in order to convince the English to back an amphibious assault on Portugal in April 1589. Led by Francis Drake and John Norris, the expedition of 120 ships and 19,000 men failed due to poor planning.

Portugal's status was maintained under the first two kings of the Union, Philip II and Philip III. Both monarchs gave high-ranking positions to Portuguese nobles in the Spanish courts, and Portugal maintained an independent law, currency, and government. The court even briefly considered moving the royal capital to Lisbon, but this was opposed by the Castilian aristocracy.

== Continuity in the administrative system ==
The history of Portugal from the dynastic crisis in 1578 to the first Braganza dynasty monarchs was a period of transition. The Portuguese Empire's spice trade was peaking at the start of this period following the great age of exploration. It continued to enjoy widespread influence and dominated global trade routes.

Due to the complexity in the management of government, the Spanish monarch needed some auxiliary bodies, as the Councils (Consejos), dedicated to the advice and resolution of problems, and submitted to the monarch's knowledge and dictum. This complexity needed a permanent seat, and Philip II of Spain established in 1562 the permanent capital in Madrid, seat of the Royal Court and of the administrative staff, although transferred to Valladolid, with the whole administrative staff, during a brief period (1601–1606).

The government functioned as follows; the administrative correspondence came to the different Councils in Madrid, then the secretary of every Council arranged the material for the attention of the king, and later the king assembled with the secretaries requesting the opinion of the council. After that, the Council held a session to deal with the issue and to formally agree to consult the monarch. The secretary raised the issue to the king, and his reply was returned to the council with the decision to be executed. The meetings of the Councils took place in the royal palace, and they did not count on the presence of the king habitually. In this poly-synodical system, "Consejo de Estado" (Council of State) stood out for its importance. The Consejo de Estado in Madrid, entrusted to declare on the major decisions that concerned the organization and the defense of the ensemble of the Hispanic monarchy, and it had frequently that to get into Portuguese matters. Even, the Council of War (Consejo de Guerra) exercised its jurisdiction on the troops placed in the Castilian strongholds established on the Portuguese littoral.

And also, there were Councils of territorial character, which functions specialized in a concrete territorial space, the Council of Castile, Council of Aragon, Council of Navarre, Council of Italy, Council of the Indies, Council of Flanders, and the Council of Portugal. The Council of Portugal, established in 1582, was integrated with a president and six (later four) counselors, and it was abolished at the end of the war in 1668, when Charles II of Spain gave up his title as king of Portugal. The function of the Council consisted in representing the Cortes of the Crown of Portugal for matters of justice and the economy. Any decision of the king concerning his kingdom had to be consulted with the council before being transmitted to the chancellery of Lisbon and to the concerned courts. The Council of Portugal was briefly replaced twice: in 1619, with the presence of the king in Lisbon, and between 1639 and 1658, when it was replaced by the Junta of Portugal. From the Restoration, the Council continued existing, since Philip IV had not recognized the independence of Portugal, and continued administering those Portuguese faithful to the Spanish monarch, and the government of Ceuta.

Relating to the particular government of the Kingdom of Portugal itself: during the union of the Kingdom of Portugal to the Spanish monarchy, the Spanish Habsburgs on the whole respected the pledges made at Thomar in 1581 to allow considerable Portuguese autonomy and to respect the territories of its empire. Public offices were reserved for Portuguese subjects at home and overseas. The king was represented at Lisbon sometimes by a governor and sometimes by a viceroy. So, Spain left the administration of Portugal and its empire largely to the Portuguese themselves, under general supervision from Madrid channeled through the viceroy in Lisbon. Important matters, however, were referred to Madrid, where they came before the Council of Portugal. In the Kingdom of Portugal, the polysynodial system was reinforced:

- The Conselho de Estado (Council of State) of Lisbon was the king of Portugal's private Council, entrusted of debating major issues related to the Crown, especially for foreign policy. The counselors could send their remarks to the king, and the king consulted them through his viceroy. Although the Conselho de Estado of Lisbon, worked as the advisory body to the viceroy, this Council of State was without clearly defined administrative powers and did not perform any relevant role of coordination. The Spanish kings maintained the system of two secretaries of state, one for the kingdom and the other for "India", that is to say, for the colonies, despite several conflicts over jurisdiction, until the creation of the Conselho da Índia in 1604.
- In the same way, Spanish kings retained the Mesa da Consciência e Ordens, which was both tribunal and council for religious affairs and was responsible for administering ecclesiastical appointments and for the property of the military orders in the colonies as well as in the home country.
- Portuguese Inquisition remained independent from the Mesa da Consciência e Ordens. There were three major courts in Lisbon, Coimbra and Évora.
- Also preserved was the Desembargo do Paço (Royal Board of Justice) in Lisbon. This board, the highest law court in the kingdom of Portugal, controlled the appointment of all magistrates and judges and oversaw the Casa da Suplicação (Court of Appeals) in Lisbon, as well as the high courts in the Portuguese overseas territories. The first function of the Desembargo do Paço was to control the recruitment of the magistrates (leitura de bacharéis) and to monitor them in the exercise of their charge, its control spread to the whole of the juridical professions. The Desembargo do Paço had to arbitrate conflicts between other courts of the kingdom. This court granted dispensations, acts of legitimization and another relevant issues about the justice and the grace, and which on occasion advised the king on political and economic as well as judicial matters. Moreover, a commission of jurists set up to reform the legal system produced a new code for Portugal, the Ordenações Filipinas, promulgated in 1603.
- The Casa da Suplicação and the Casa do Cível were royal courts of appeal for civil cases as criminal cases. The Casa do Cível exercised jurisdiction over the northern part of the kingdom, and the Casa da Suplicação over the rest on the realm including the islands and overseas.
- In 1591, the four Vedores da Fazenda (overseers of the Treasury) were replaced by a Conselho da Fazenda composed of one Vedor da Fazenda presiding over four councillors (two of them lawyers) and four secretaries. The Conselho da Fazenda exercised a control over the officials of finance, administered the king's property and exercised its jurisdiction over the customs and the arsenals, the court of accounts and the administration of the monopolistic trade with overseas.
- From 1604, the newly created Conselho da Índia was invested with powers for all overseas affairs, apart from matters concerning Madeira, the Azores and the strongholds of Morocco, and colonial officials were appointed and their dispatches handled by it. However, it was the Conselho da Fazenda which dealt with naval expeditions, the buying and selling of pepper and the collection of the royal revenues, in fact with all economic business. The Conselho da Índia, therefore, exercised only limited powers. As a creation of the Spanish king, it was regarded with disfavour by the Portuguese and because of the jealousy of the Mesa da Consciência e Ordens disappeared in 1614.

For urgent matters, a system of meetings was introduced, such as the Junta for the reform of the Council of Portugal (1606–1607, 1610), the Junta for the classification of the debts to the treasury (since 1627) or the Juntas for the organization of the navies of succor of Brazil (since 1637).

== Portuguese Empire challenged ==
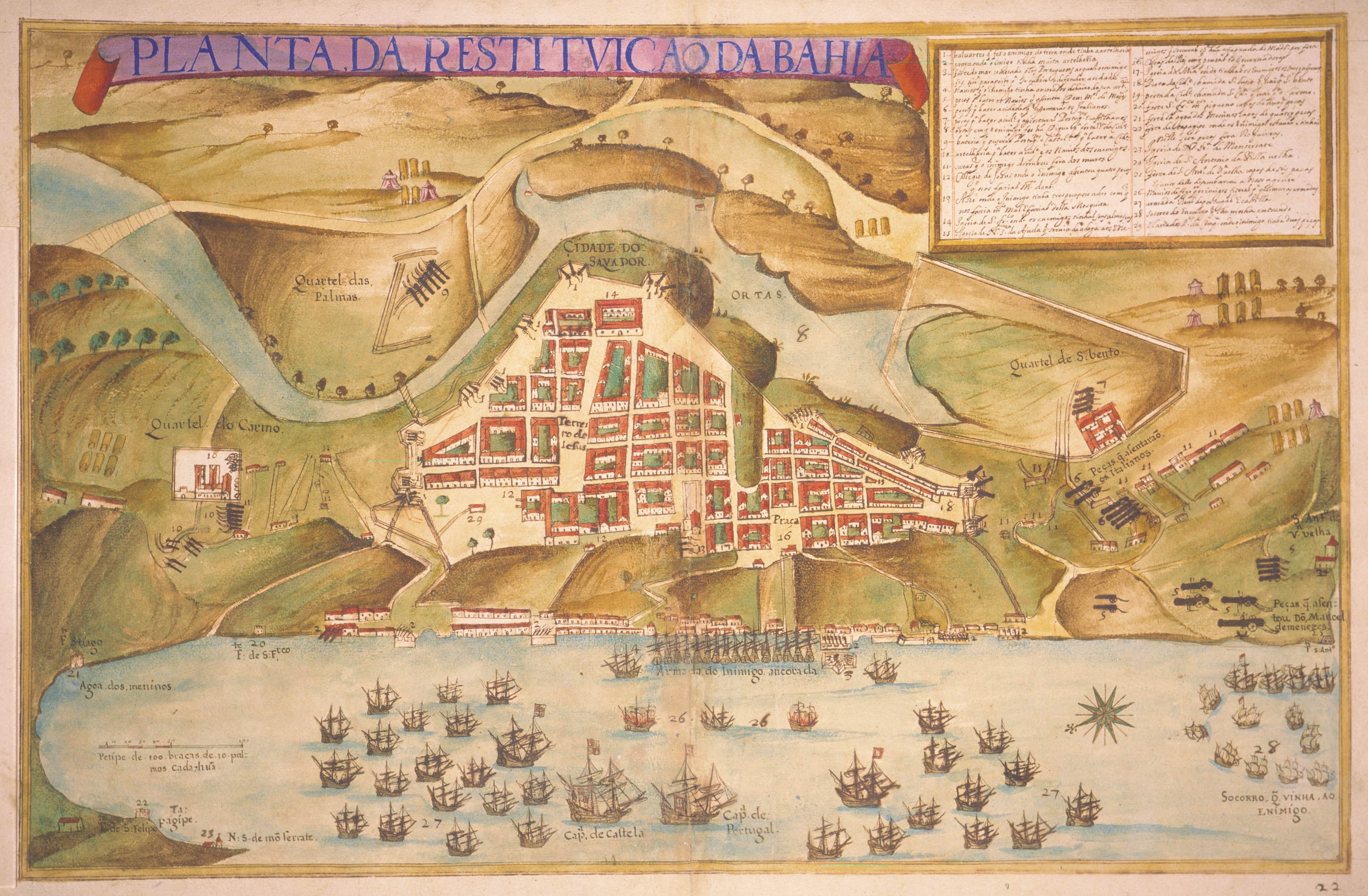
Iberian Union forces recapturing Salvador de Bahia in 1625

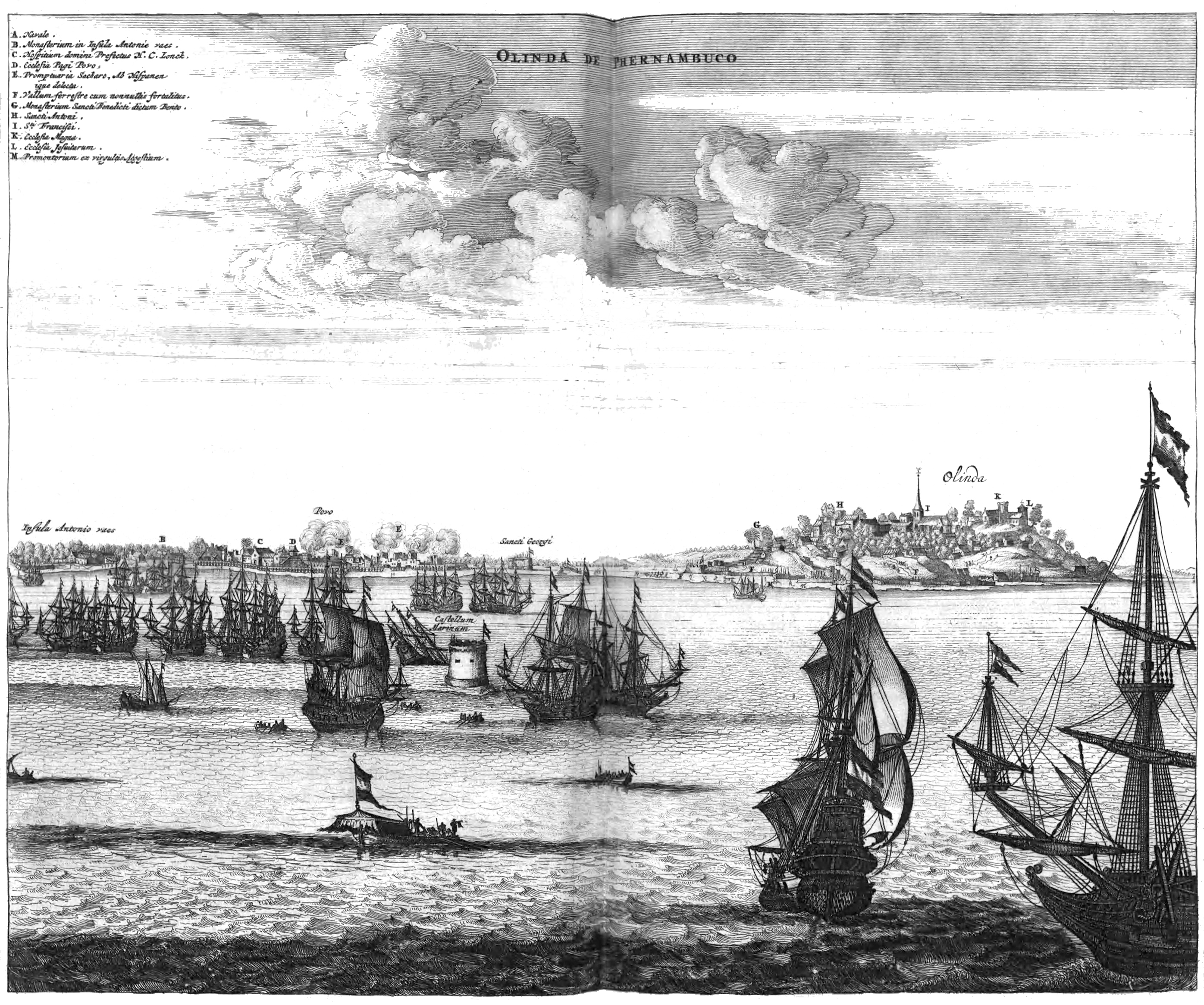
1630: Dutch siege of Olinda, located in the Brazilian captaincy of Pernambuco, the largest and richest sugar-producing area in the world.

Throughout the 17th century, the increasing raids on Portuguese merchant shipping by Dutch, English and French privateers and their establishment of trading posts in Africa, Asia and the Americas undermined Portugal's monopoly on the lucrative spice trade. This sent the Portuguese spice trade into a long decline. The diversion of wealth from Portugal by the Habsburg monarchy to support the Catholic side of the Thirty Years' War also created strains within the union, although Portugal did also benefit from Spanish military power in helping to retain Brazil and in disrupting Dutch trade. These events, and those that occurred at the end of Aviz dynasty and the Iberian Union, led Portugal to a state of economic dependency on its colonies, first India and then Brazil.

The joining of the two crowns deprived Portugal of a separate foreign policy, and Spain's enemies became Portugal's. England had been an ally of Portugal since the Treaty of Windsor in 1386. War between Spain and England led to a deterioration of the relations with Portugal's oldest ally, and the loss of Hormuz. War with the Dutch led to invasions of many countries in Asia, including Portuguese Ceylon (today's Sri Lanka), and commercial interests in Japan, Africa (Mina), and South America. Even though the Portuguese were unable to capture the entire island of Ceylon, they were able to keep the coastal regions of Ceylon under their control for a considerable time. Brazil was partially conquered by both France and the Dutch.

In the 17th century, taking advantage of this period of Portuguese weakness, many Portuguese territories in Brazil were occupied by the Dutch, who gained access to the sugarcane plantations. The whole Brazilian northeast was occupied, but the Dutch conquest was short-lived. The Recapture of Bahia by a Spanish-Portuguese fleet in 1625 was followed by a rapid recovery of the lost territories. The Dutch returned in 1630 and captured Recife and Olinda in the captaincy of Pernambuco, the largest and richest sugar-producing area in the world. John Maurice, Prince of Nassau-Siegen, was appointed as the governor of the Dutch possessions in Brazil in 1637 by the Dutch West India Company. He landed at Recife, the port of Pernambuco, in January 1637. By a series of successful expeditions, he gradually extended the Dutch possessions from Sergipe in the south to São Luís, Maranhão in the north. He likewise conquered the Portuguese possessions of Elmina Castle, São Tomé Island, and Luanda, Angola, on the west coast of Africa. This began a war over Brazil, which would see the Dutch establish a colony called New Holland. However, the Second Battle of Guararapes, the second and decisive battle in a conflict called Pernambucana Insurrection, ended the Dutch occupation of the Portuguese colony of Brazil.

On the other hand, the Iberian Union opened to both countries a worldwide span of control, as Portugal dominated the African and Asian coasts that surrounded the Indian Ocean, and Spain the Pacific Ocean and both sides of Central and South America, while both shared the Atlantic Ocean space.

== Decline of the Union and revolt of Portugal ==
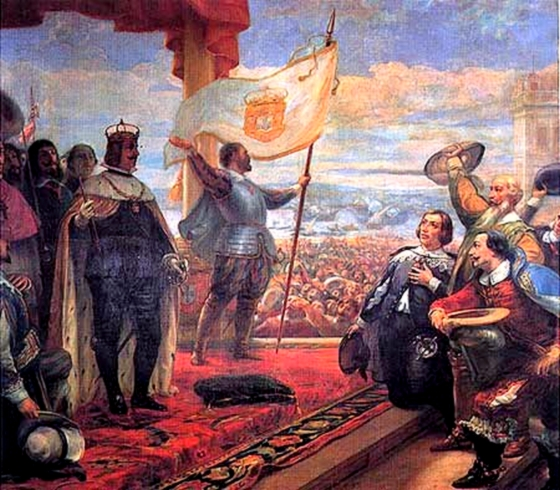
Acclamation of John IV as king of Portugal (1908), painting by Veloso Salgado in the Military Museum, Lisbon.

When Philip II of Portugal (and III of Spain) died, he was succeeded by Philip III (and IV of Spain), who had a different approach on Portuguese issues. Taxes raised affected mainly the Portuguese merchants (Carmo Reis 1587). The Portuguese nobility began to lose its importance at the Spanish Cortes, and government posts in Portugal were occupied by Spaniards. Ultimately, Philip III tried to make Portugal a royal province, and Portuguese nobles lost all of their power.

Several other problems also damaged Portuguese support of their union with Spain. One of these was certainly the pressure from the center, especially from Gaspar de Guzmán, Count-Duke of Olivares, towards uniformity and sharing the financial and military burden of Castile's wars in Europe. However, the Portuguese were hardly inclined to help with that, as Spain had failed to prevent the Dutch West India Company's occupation of several of Portugal's colonial holdings, despite the fact that both the Portuguese and the Spanish were nominally under the same crown.

This situation culminated in a revolution by the nobility and high bourgeoisie on 1 December 1640, 60 years after the crowning of Philip I. This revolution, while foreseeable, was most immediately sparked by a popular and institutional revolt in the Principality of Catalonia against the Crown. The plot was planned by Antão de Almada, 7th Count of Avranches, Miguel de Almeida and João Pinto Ribeiro. They, together with several associates, known as the Forty Conspirators, took advantage of the fact that the Castilian troops were occupied in the other side of the Iberian Peninsula. The rebels killed Secretary of State Miguel de Vasconcelos and imprisoned the king's cousin, Margaret of Savoy, Vicereine of Portugal, who had governed Portugal in his name. The moment was well chosen, as Philip's troops were at the time fighting the Thirty Years' War in addition to the previously mentioned revolution in Catalonia.

The support of the people became apparent almost immediately and soon John, 8th Duke of Braganza, was acclaimed king of Portugal throughout the country as John IV. By 2 December 1640, John had already sent a letter to the Municipal Chamber of Évora as sovereign of the country.

== Restoration War and the end of the Union ==
The subsequent Portuguese Restoration War against Philip III (Portuguese: Guerra da Restauração) consisted mainly of small skirmishes near the border. The most significant battles were the Battle of the Lines of Elvas (1659), the Battle of Ameixial (1663), the Battle of Castelo Rodrigo (1664), and the Battle of Montes Claros (1665); the Portuguese were victorious in all of these battles. However, the Spaniards won the Battle of Vilanova (1658) and the Battle of the Berlengas (1666). The Battle of Montijo (1644) was indecisive, starting out with great Spanish success and ending with Portuguese success; the numbers of casualties were nearly equal.

Several decisions made by John IV to strengthen his forces made these victories possible. On 11 December 1640, the Council of War was created to organize all the operations. Next, the king created the Junta of the Frontiers, to take care of the fortresses near the border, the hypothetical defense of Lisbon, and the garrisons and sea ports. In December 1641, a tenancy was created to assure upgrades on all fortresses that would be paid with regional taxes. John IV also organized the army, established the Military Laws of King Sebastian, and developed intense diplomatic activity focused on restoring good relations with England. Meanwhile, the best Spanish forces were pre-occupied with their battles against the French in Catalonia, along the Pyrenees, Italy and the Low Countries. The Spanish forces in Portugal never received adequate support. Nevertheless, Philip IV felt he could not give up what he regarded as his rightful inheritance. By the time the war with France ended in 1659, the Portuguese military were well established and ready to confront the last major attempt of a worn out Spanish regime to reclaim control.

English soldiers were sent to Portugal and helped the Portuguese rout Don John's army at Ameixial near Estremoz on June 8, 1663. The Spaniards lost 8,000 men and all their artillery while the Portuguese had only 2,000 casualties. On 7 July 1664 about 3,000 Portuguese met 7,000 Spaniards near Figueira de Castelo Rodrigo and killed 2,000 and took 500 prisoners. Many Spanish communities lost population and blamed their decline on the war against Portugal. Louis XIV sent French troops to Lisbon, and on 17 June 1665 the German General Frederick Schomberg led about 20,000 Portuguese forces to victory at Montes Claros near Vila Viçosa with only 700 killed and 2,000 wounded. The Spanish army of 22,600 men was devastated with 4,000 dead and 6,000 captured. Protests erupted in Madrid as Spain had wasted 25 million ducats on the disastrous Portuguese war. The Spanish tried to carry on the war for two more years of increasingly fitful warfare. Spain recognized Portugal's sovereignty and made peace on 13 February 1668.

== Legacy ==
In the Basque Autonomous Community of Spain, the Valdegovía adopted the royal coat of arms during the Iberian Union period with the Navarre arms and the Portuguese arms added on the honor point.

The Spanish city of Ceuta was a part of the Portuguese Empire until the end of the Iberian Union in 1640, after which it decided to remain with Spain. Thus the coat of arms of the city is nearly identical to that of the Kingdom of Portugal, showing the seven castles over the red bordure and the five escutcheons with silver roundels, and the gyronny field of its flag is identical to that of the flag of Lisbon, to commemorate the fact of that flag having been the first raised in Ceuta by the Portuguese when they conquered the city in 1415.

== See also ==
- History of Portugal
- History of Spain
- Iberian Peninsula
- Union of the Crowns
- Hispanic Monarchy (political entity)
- Black Legend (Spain)
