= Polysynodial System =

Form of government of the Spanish Habsburgs

Hispanic Monarchy with the union of the Spanish and Portuguese Empire

The Polysynodial System, Polysynodial Regime (Spanish: régimen polisinodial) or System of Councils was the way of organization of the composite monarchy ruled by the Catholic Monarchs and the Spanish Habsburgs, which entrusted the central administration in a group of collegiate bodies (councils) already existing or created ex novo. Most of the councils were formed by lawyers trained in academic study of Roman law. After its creation in 1521 (and 1526 revamp), the Council of State, chaired by the monarch and formed by the high nobility and clergy, became the supreme body of the monarchy. The polysynodial system met its demise in the early 18th century in the wake of the promulgation of the Nueva Planta decrees by the incoming Bourbon dynasty, which organized a system underpinned by Secretaries of State.

== Organization ==
Its origin goes back to the Middle Ages in the consultative bodies of the crowns of Castile, Aragon and Navarre. The basic mechanism of operation was the elevation of a consultation to the monarch, who resolved according to their opinion.

The councils were of three types:

1. Councils that had a sphere of competence throughout the territory of the monarch, with the indifference of the kingdom: the Council of State, the highest advisory body presided over by the President of the Royal Council of Castile, the Inquisitor general and the members of the Council of War, which was the second advisory body, and the Council of the Inquisition.
2. Councils with powers of government in certain territories: Royal Council of Castile - and within this, by reason of the matter, were the Council of Military Orders, the Council of Crusade and the Council of Finance, Council of Aragon, Council of Navarre, Council of the Indies, Council of Italy, Council of Flanders, and during the Iberian Union, the Council of Portugal. By order of hierarchy, those of Castile and Aragon were, in that order, the pre-eminent ones, the kingdoms of the Catholic Monarchs, with the Council of the Indies having great importance because of the extent and wealth of its territories in the New World and the Philippines.
3. Councils were the Boards, of less important character and, in general, created for specific and fixed term matters.

== Councils of Spain ==
=== Council of State ===
(Spanish: Consejo de Estado)
Established under Charles V, the Council of State did not have specific areas of focus or competences, nor territorial scopes determined by what was supraterritorial, which was the reason why the most important subjects and of foreign policy, as well as the subjects relative to the monarch and to the royal family. It was established in 1526 when Suleiman the Magnificent threatened Austria.

It was the only Council that did not have a president, since it was the monarch who assumed that function. His advisors were not specialists in legal matters but in international relations, like the Duke of Alba or Granvela. The councilors were, therefore, members of the high nobility and the high clergy. Its mission was to advise the monarch on foreign policy and had control of the embassies of Rome, Vienna, Venice, Genoa, and the major powers of Europe: France, England and Portugal.

Unlike the Council of Castile, in which the monarch listened to the councilors and executed the conclusions they presented, in the Council of State it was the monarch himself who exposed the points to be discussed, listened to the counselors and, subsequently, made decisions. Related to the Council of State was the Council of War, they had the same members, except that the Council of War had specific advisers, and the matters they were in charge of everything related to the armies, equipment, appointments, war planning and last judicial instance.

=== Council of Finance ===
(Spanish: Consejo de Hacienda)
Established under Charles V, Holy Roman Emperor, the creation of the Council of Finance (Hacienda) in 1523 was a remarkable rationalization of the Castilian treasury, which until then had two accounts that were continually facing each other (the Major Account, responsible for the collection of taxes and their administration, and Accounts, which was responsible for intervening and verifying the accounts of the previous one).

This council consisted of three counselors, normally university graduates with experience in the bureaucracy of the Court and four assistants (Treasurer, finance clerk, accountant and secretary), to decide on matters of the Royal Treasury, were adopted by the full Council or by its three most important courts: the Court of Millions, the Court of Oidores and the Accounts Accountant. Their competences included collecting taxes, administrating them and ensuring that their collection was fulfilled; Executing expenses, proposing new funding sources, proposing budgets and requesting reports from accountants (something like the current accountants) of the other Councils. This Council was characterized by the continuous friction with the other Councils, aggravated by the fact that the members of the Finance Council were rarely of important families, unlike the rest of the Councils.

=== Council of Inquisition ===
(Spanish: Consejo de la Suprema Inquisición)
Established during the Catholic Monarchs, it had jurisdiction of the Council of the Inquisition extended beyond the limits of Castile and the Indies, encompassing the kingdoms of Aragon with the exception of Naples, and Navarre, but not Portugal, nor Milan, nor the Burgundian territories. It was composed of a president (the inquisitor general) and six councilors (the apostolic inquisitors). Its original function was to resolve issues of appeal, but it also became involved in the proceedings initiated by the local courts.

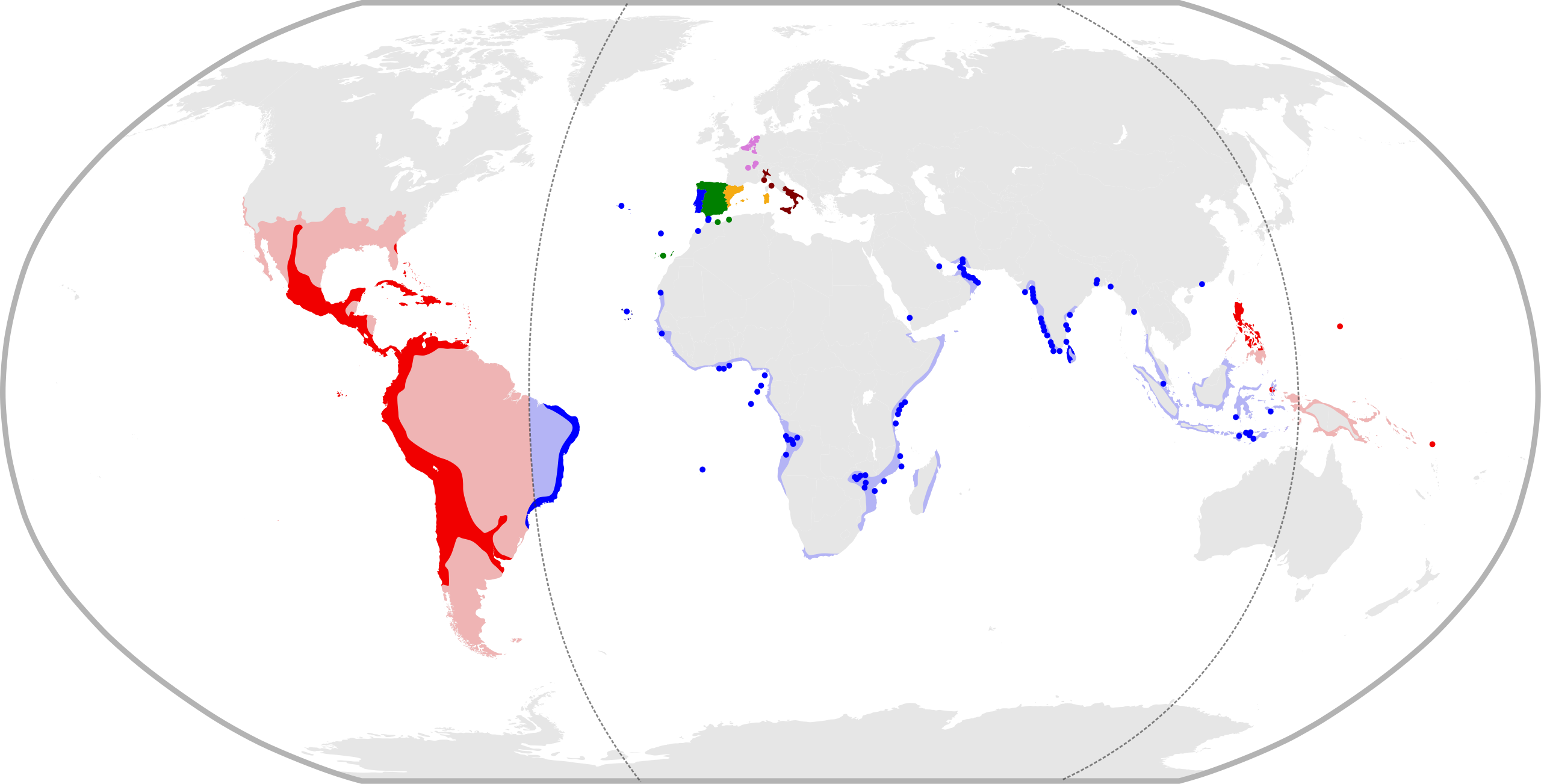
Map of the Spanish-Portuguese Empire in 1598. Territories administered by the Council of Castile Territories administered by the Council of Aragon Territories administered by the Council of Portugal Territories administered by the Council of Italy Territories appointed to the Council of Flanders Territories administered by the Council of the Indies

=== Council of Castile ===
It was the most prestigious in importance after the sovereign. The number of members varied with time, in it representatives of the main noble houses of Castile, two or three ecclesiastics, and a variable number of university-trained men met. Its main functions were the government of the kingdom of Castile, as well as the administration of justice, following the work of 'court of appeal.' In fact, this second function was the most common.

=== Council of Aragon ===
Established during the Catholic Monarchs, the council had jurisdiction over the territories of the crown of Aragon: Aragon, Catalonia, Valencia, Majorca and Sardinia, with the exception of Naples and Sicily, which in 1556 were transferred to the new Council of Italy. Its function was to decide in conflicts of jurisprudence between the Crown and the special privileges (fueros). It was composed of a vice chancellor (president), a general treasurer, nine councilors and a notary. As the council presided over territories, it worked in a similar way to that of Castille only in regards to Mallorca and Sardinia.

=== Council of Portugal ===
Under Philip II of Spain the Council of Portugal was established in 1582, composed of one president and six, then four councilors. He was in charge of the affairs of the kingdom of Portugal in the administration of justice, appointment of ecclesiastical offices, appointment of officers and economy. With the Portuguese Restoration, in 1640, the Council continued to exist, since Philip IV did not recognize the independence of Portugal, taking charge of the Portuguese faithful to the Spanish monarch and the government of Ceuta, 2 until it was dissolved after the Treaty of Lisbon (1668).

=== Council of Italy ===
It was established under Philip II in 1556 when Italian affairs were under the jurisdiction of the Council of Aragon. It was responsible for justice, finances, the appointment of officials and the viceroys in the former Italian possessions of the Crown of Aragon (Naples and Sicily). Subsequently, the affairs of the State of Milan were added. It was formed by a president and 6 regents: two for the kingdom of Naples, two for Sicily and two for Milan. Each territory had a Spanish and an Italian ruler.

=== Council of Flanders ===
Its function was the appointment of posts, the administration of justice and finance in the Netherlands and in Burgundy. It had a president and a variable number of directors.

=== Council of the Indies ===
Established in 1524 under Charles V, the council was composed of a president, a great chancellor, twelve advisers, specific posts like those of the official Chronicler of the Indies, Cosmographer and a judge of the House of Trade, which was also Superintendent of the Compilation of the Laws of the Indies, and four officers.

As for its powers, it had supreme jurisdiction in all matters relating to the sea and land of the New World, in the military and the political, in peace and in war, in civil and criminal matters; supervised the operation of the House of Trade, in Seville; he proposed the posts of viceroys, generals of navies and fleets, archbishoprics and bishoprics in the Indies; it was the court of appeal and regulated the matters of ecclesiastical matter according to the royal patronage.

=== Council of the Crusade ===
(Spanish: Consejo de Cruzada)
The Crusade Council, initially, was created to administer the three bulls granted by the Papacy (crusade, subsidies and toilet) for the defense of the Catholic faith and the war against the infidels. This council, usually formed by ecclesiastics, a president, two councilors of the Council of Castile, a regent of the Council of Aragon and a councilor of the Council of the Indies was responsible for the collection and management of said bulls, which were an important source of funding to the royal coffers.

=== Council of Military Orders ===
(Spanish: Consejo Consejo de las Órdenes)
Established under the Catholic Monarchs, the Council consisted of a president and six councilors. Once King Ferdinand the Catholic obtained from the pope the administration of the entailed estates (mayorazgos) of the Order of Calatrava in 1489, a Council was established for its management. King Ferdinand seized control of the entailed estates of the military Orders of Santiago in 1493, and Alcántara in 1494 (the Order of Montesa would be added in 1587), with which in 1498 the Order Council was established. Their functions included the appointments, the administration of their possessions, the administration of the justice of the gentlemen of the four Orders, as well as the designation of the same, but it ended up becoming a kind of Court of Honor, a guarantee of purity of blood.

== The decline of the system ==
Since the start of Enlightenment, these institutions would be laid aside because of the creation of the Secretaries of State and Universal Dispatch, which took all the Councils' power. The Councils that survived served as a tool of the King to concentrate and increase his power, and with this going into an absolutist system. The Councils, many of them distorted with respect to their initial origin, disappeared altogether during the nineteenth century, replacing it at the outset with the figure of the Central Supreme Board recognized by the liberal constituents, being this organ the anteroom of the Council of Ministers created during the reign of Isabella II.

== See also ==
- Spanish Empire
- Catholic Monarchs
- The empire on which the sun never sets
