= Council of Aragon =

Former part of the Spanish-Portuguese Empire

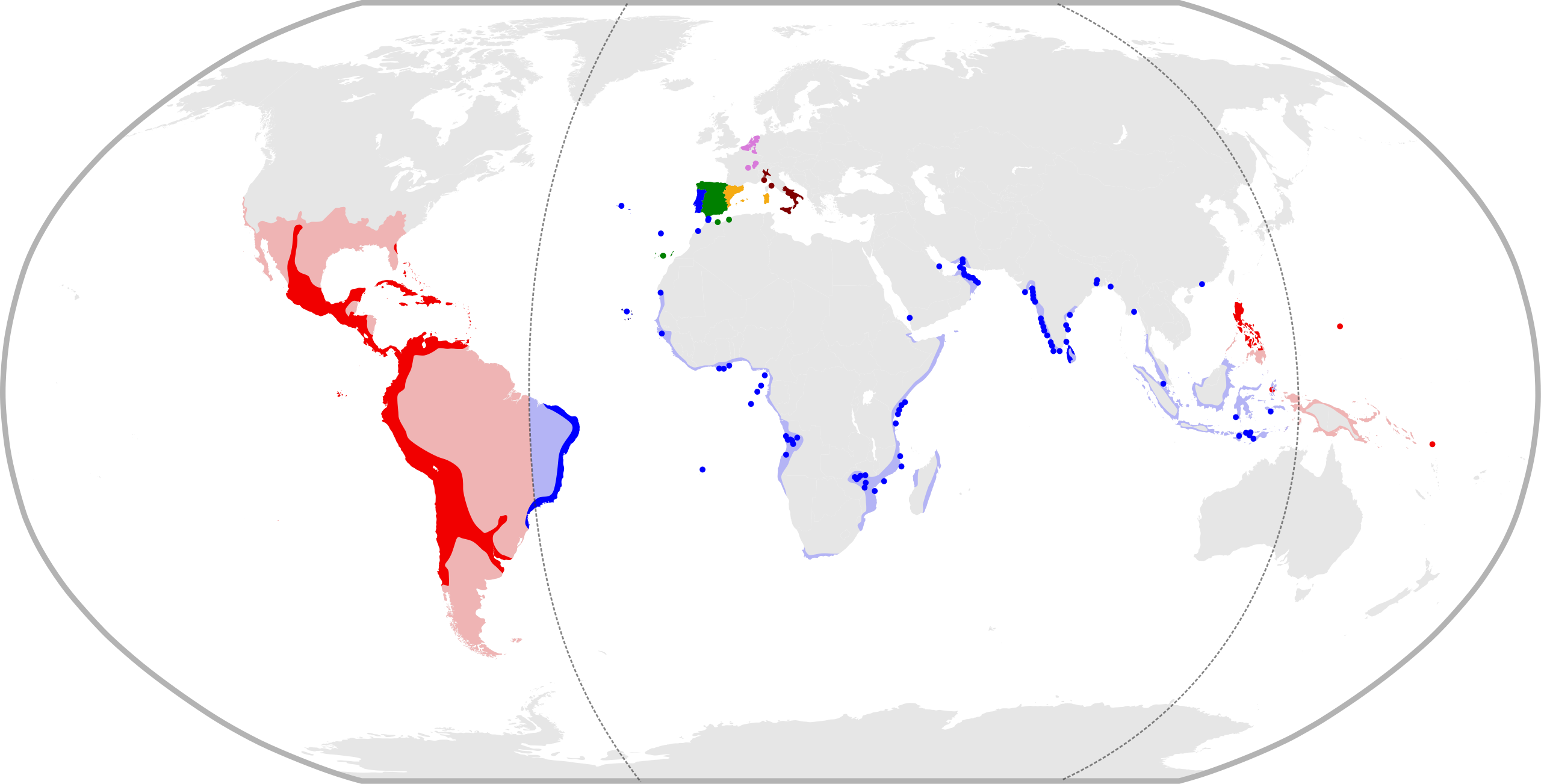
Map of the Spanish-Portuguese Empire in 1598. Territories administered by the Council of Castile Territories administered by the Council of Aragon Territories administered by the Council of Portugal Territories administered by the Council of Italy Territories administered by the Council of the Indies Territories appointed to the Council of Flanders

The Council of Aragon, officially, the Royal and Supreme Council of Aragon (Spanish: Real y Supremo Consejo de Aragón; Aragonese: Consello d'Aragón; Catalan: Consell Suprem d'Aragó), was a ruling body and key part of the domestic government of the Spanish Empire in Europe, second only to the monarch himself. It administered the Crown of Aragon, which was composed of the Kingdom of Aragon, Principality of Catalonia (including Roussillon until 1659), Kingdom of Valencia, Kingdom of Majorca and Kingdom of Sardinia. The Aragonese possessions in Southern Italy (Naples and Sicily) were later incorporated into the Council of Italy, together with the Duchy of Milan, in 1556. The Council of Aragon ruled these territories as a part of Spain, and later the Iberian Union.

== History ==
The Council of Aragon was the result of the composite nature of the Spanish Empire, composed of individual kingdoms ruled by a common king but each retaining their own laws, customs, and government. Ferdinand II, along with his wife Isabella, was the first ruler of both Castile and Aragon. Because Ferdinand II was crowned king of Castile before becoming king of Aragon (1474 and 1479, respectively), the majority of his time was spent at the Castilian royal court in Valladolid rather than in Aragon. This royal absenteeism created problems in the government and organization for the lands of Aragon. As a result, the viceroy and conciliar systems arose to solve these administrative problems. In 1494, the Council of Aragon was founded out of what had previously been the royal Council of the kings of Aragon. The Council consisted of a Treasurer-General, a Vice-Chancellor, and five Regentes. All of these positions except the Treasurer-General were filled with native-born Aragonese. Much of Council's members were drawn from the letrados, the lawyer-class on which Ferdinand and Isabella had relied on for administrative organization of their lands. While the viceroy remained the supreme administration in Aragon, the Council controlled their activities and was the link between the viceroy and the king. Its functions included receiving reports from viceroys, advising the king on his policies, and dispatching the king's orders to various territories. Through the Council of Aragon the king was able to oversee territories he could not visit and interact with the natives of these lands.

The Council of Aragon served as the basis for future Councils that were created as the Spanish Empire expanded in the 16th century. Gaspar de Guzmán, Count-Duke of Olivares, in his memorandum on the Spanish government for King Philip IV, said of the councils:

As the king is represented in different ways, being king of different kingdoms which have been incorporated into the Crown while preserving their separate identities, it is necessary to have in the Court a Council for each one. Your Majesty is thus considered to be present in each kingdom.

Councils were established not only for each of Spain's possessions (for example Italy, Portugal, and Flanders) but also for general affairs, such as the Council of the Inquisition (for religious matters), the Council of War, and the Consejo de Estado, the Council of State. Under Philip II, the Council of State remained rather small as the king preferred to do his own ruling. However, under Philip III it grew and became the "coping stone of the system."

While the advantages of the conciliar system were obvious, the system also had its disadvantages. There remained no association between the different parts of the empires or attempt to break down the barriers between its disparate peoples. Indeed the only thing binding them together was the presence of a common king. In addition, there was no effort to establish a common government or promote economic and commercial ties between the various provinces. The individual interests of one province took priority over a measure that may benefit all. As a result, in the 16th century, both in Aragon and other conciliar-ruled territories, there lacked any real form of association.

== See also ==
- Cortes of Tarazona (1592)
- Crown of Aragon
