= Spanish Italy =

Spanish Italy may refer to:

- Duchy of Milan under Spain (1535-1706)
- Italian territories of the Spanish Empire before the death of Charles II in 1700, overseen by the Council of Italy
- Kingdom of Naples and Kingdom of Sicily under Charles III of Spain and Ferdinand IV of Naples (III of Sicily)
