= Jean de Gaverelles =

Jean de Gaverelles (1579—1645), knight of Christ, was a lawyer who held high military and civilian office in the Spanish Netherlands.

== Early life ==
Gaverelles was born in Antwerp in January 1579, the son of Jean de Gaverelles, clerk to the Antwerp cloth hall.

After studying law at Leuven University, Gaverelles married Maria De Keyser but was soon widowed, and never remarried. In 1611 he became first a surveyor in Brussels, and then towards the end of the year one of the four secretaries to Antwerp city council. From 1617 to 1624 he served as pensionary to the city of Antwerp. He supported Anne of Saint Bartholomew's foundation of a Carmelite convent in Antwerp in 1612, and from 1610 to 1615 was lay leader of the city's Confraternity of the Scapular of Our Lady of Mount Carmel.

== Career in royal service ==
In January 1624 he entered royal service as president of the Admiralty Council in Sint-Winoksbergen, and in April was given the rank of admiral and superintendent of the fleet, overseeing the discipline and adjudicating the prizes of Dunkirkers. In 1629 he was transferred to the Council of the Admiralty in Brussels. He became a member of the Brussels Privy Council in 1631.

He held an appointment as a councillor on the Supreme Council of Flanders in Madrid from 1633 to 1645, but was largely absent from Spain on royal business after the first year, during which he became a knight of Christ. In 1634 he accompanied Cardinal-Infante Ferdinand of Austria on his march through Germany, liaising with imperial forces and negotiating with the Emperor Ferdinand II's representatives at Regensburg. He was thereafter based in Brussels, giving significant support to the president of the Privy Council, Pieter Roose. He was appointed a councillor of state in 1641.

In 1644 Gaverelles retired from all his positions in government to be ordained a priest. He died on 11 July 1645.
