= Juan de Solórzano Pereira =

Jurist

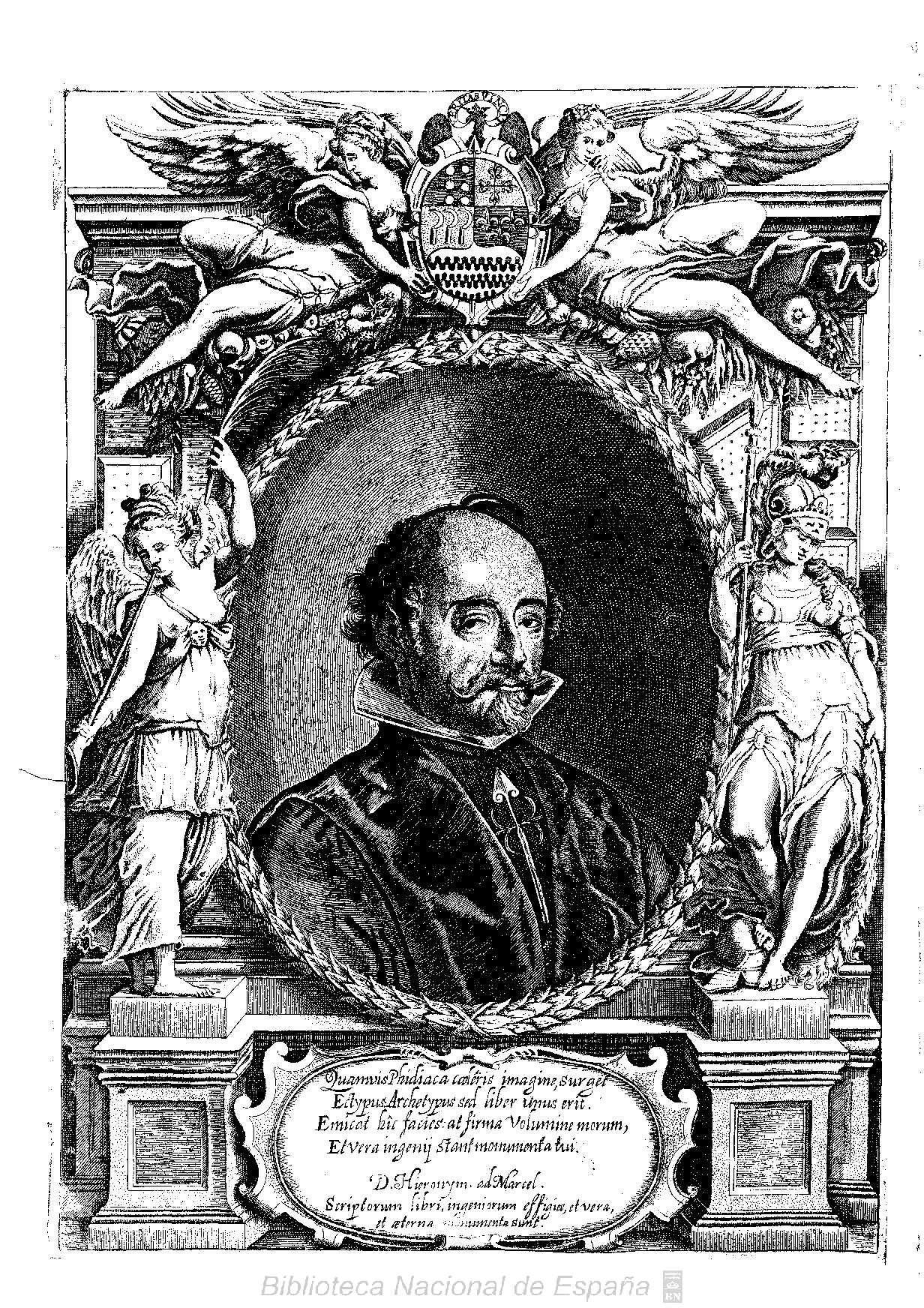
Juan de Solórzano Pereira

Juan de Solórzano Pereira (1575–1655) was a Spanish jurist who became oidor of Lima and was an early writer on the colonial law of the Spanish empire in the Americas.

By royal decree of King Philip III, in 1609 he was given the title of oidor of the Royal Audiencia of Lima. In 1616, the Viceroy of Peru at the time, Don Francisco de Borja y Aragón, Prince of Esquilache, made him manager and overseer of the Huancavelica mines, a post he held for a little over two years. On his return, he resumed his position as judge on the Audiencia of Lima until 1626, when he asked to return to Spain for personal reasons, which was granted by royal decree. In February of the following year he was appointed prosecutor of the Council of Finance, shortly afterwards prosecutor of the Royal and Supreme Council of the Indies, becoming a council member in October 1629. As prosecutor, he took the risky step to prosecute Spaniards for wrongs against Amerindians, including taxing them too highly. In 1640 King Philip IV granted him the habit of knight of the Order of Santiago as also the title of Councillor of the Supreme Council of Castile, a post he held only honorarily due to chronic deafness, an affliction that eventually forced him to retire.

Solórzano wrote the standard textbook on colonial law in Spain. His assertion that Catholic providence gave the Spanish king absolute power became linked with Spanish Neo-Platonism, which asserted that the king was the embodiment of god on earth.

Solórzano’s Indiarum iure claims the oppression of Amerindians was worse under Spain than it had been among the Incas. He ended the book “weeping at the calamities, the serfdom and the wasting of the Indians”. Historian David Brading called Solórzano the “great jurist” of the Spanish colonies. Solórzano opposed forced labour, the so-called mita, but thought it less bad than the import of slaves. He advocated the development of the non-mining economy to phase out the need for cruel practices. Solórzano advocated the use of the colonies as a market for Spanish products. He opposed the flow of precious metals across borders. He supported the right of nobles to conduct trade. He opposed taxes and economic intervention. He warned against monopoly. He supported lending at interest. He supported the land titles and office holding for Creoles.

== Works ==
- Disputatio de Indiarum jure sive de justa Indiarum occidentalium inquisitione (Madrid, 1629).
- Disputationum de Indiarum iure, sive de iusta Indiarum occidentalium gubernatione (Madrid, 1639).
- Politica indiana: sacado en lengua castellana de los dos tomos del derecho; govierno municipal de las Indias Occidentales (Madrid, 1647).
- Emblemata centum regio-politica (Madrid, 1653).

== See also ==
- Enrique García Hernán
- Santiago Hierro Anibarro
- Bartolomé de Las Casas
