= Council of the Indies =

Spain's advisors on America, East and West Indies

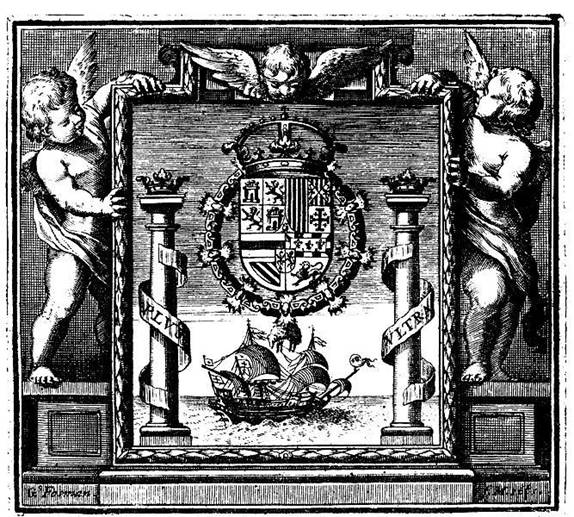
Royal emblem of the Council of the Indies, as on the frontispiece of the Recopilación de Leyes de los Reynos de las Indias. Madrid, 1774.

The Council of the Indies (Spanish: Consejo de las Indias), officially the Royal and Supreme Council of the Indies (Spanish: Real y Supremo Consejo de las Indias, pronounced [reˈal i suˈpɾemo konˈsexo ðe las ˈindjas]), was the most important administrative organ of the Spanish Empire for the Americas and those territories it governed, such as the Spanish East Indies. The Spanish Crown asserted absolute power over the Indies, and the Council of the Indies was the administrative and advisory body to the Crown in respect of those overseas realms. It was established in 1524 by Charles V to administer "the Indies", Spain's name for its territories. Such an administrative entity, on the conciliar model of the Council of Castile, was created following the Spanish conquest of the Aztec Empire in 1521, which demonstrated the importance of the Americas. Originally an itinerary council that followed Charles V, it was subsequently established as an autonomous body with legislative, executive and judicial functions by Philip II of Spain and placed in Madrid in 1561.

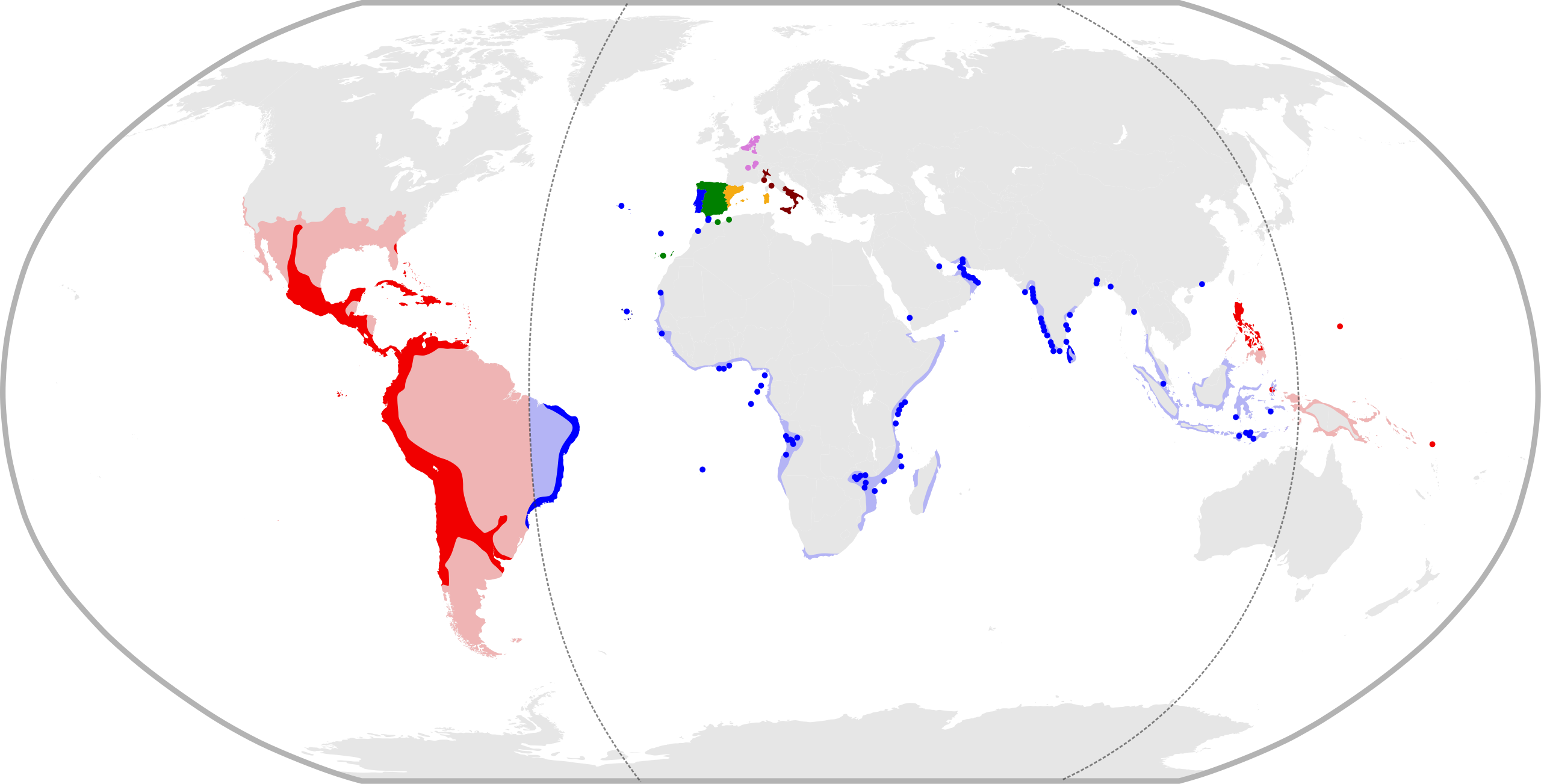
Map of the Spanish Empire in 1598. Territories administered by the Council of Castile Territories administered by the Council of Aragon Territories administered by the Council of Portugal Territories administered by the Council of Italy Territories administered by the Council of the Indies Territories appointed to the Council of Flanders

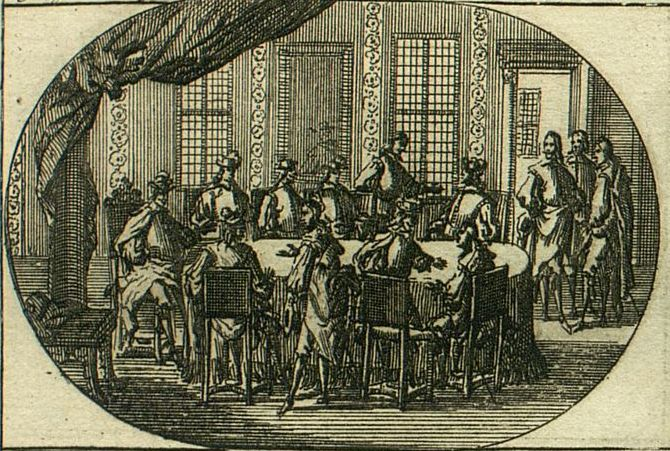
(Spanish) Council of the Indies from Carte du Gouvernement civil de l´Espagne et de tous les Conseils Souverains, in 1719.

The Council of the Indies was abolished in 1812 by the Cortes of Cádiz, briefly restored in 1814 by Ferdinand VII, and definitively abolished in 1834 by the regency, acting on behalf of the four-year-old Isabella II.

== History ==
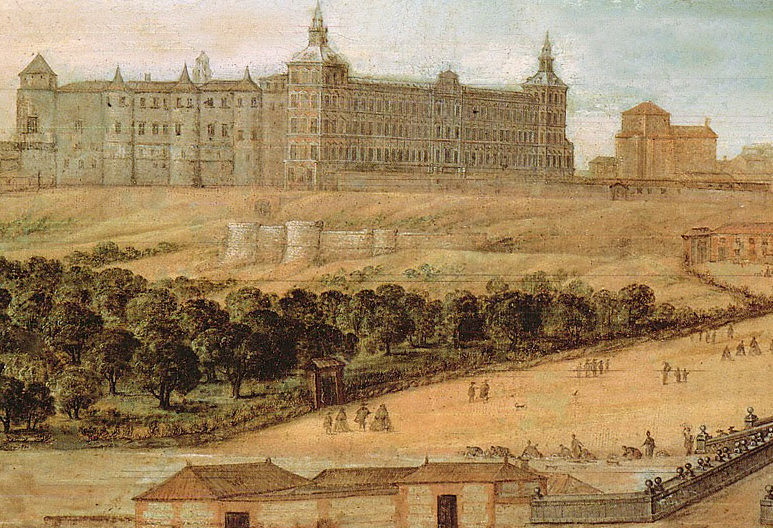
The Royal Alcázar of Madrid, residence of the kings of Spain, in which the Council of the Indies was installed until 1701.

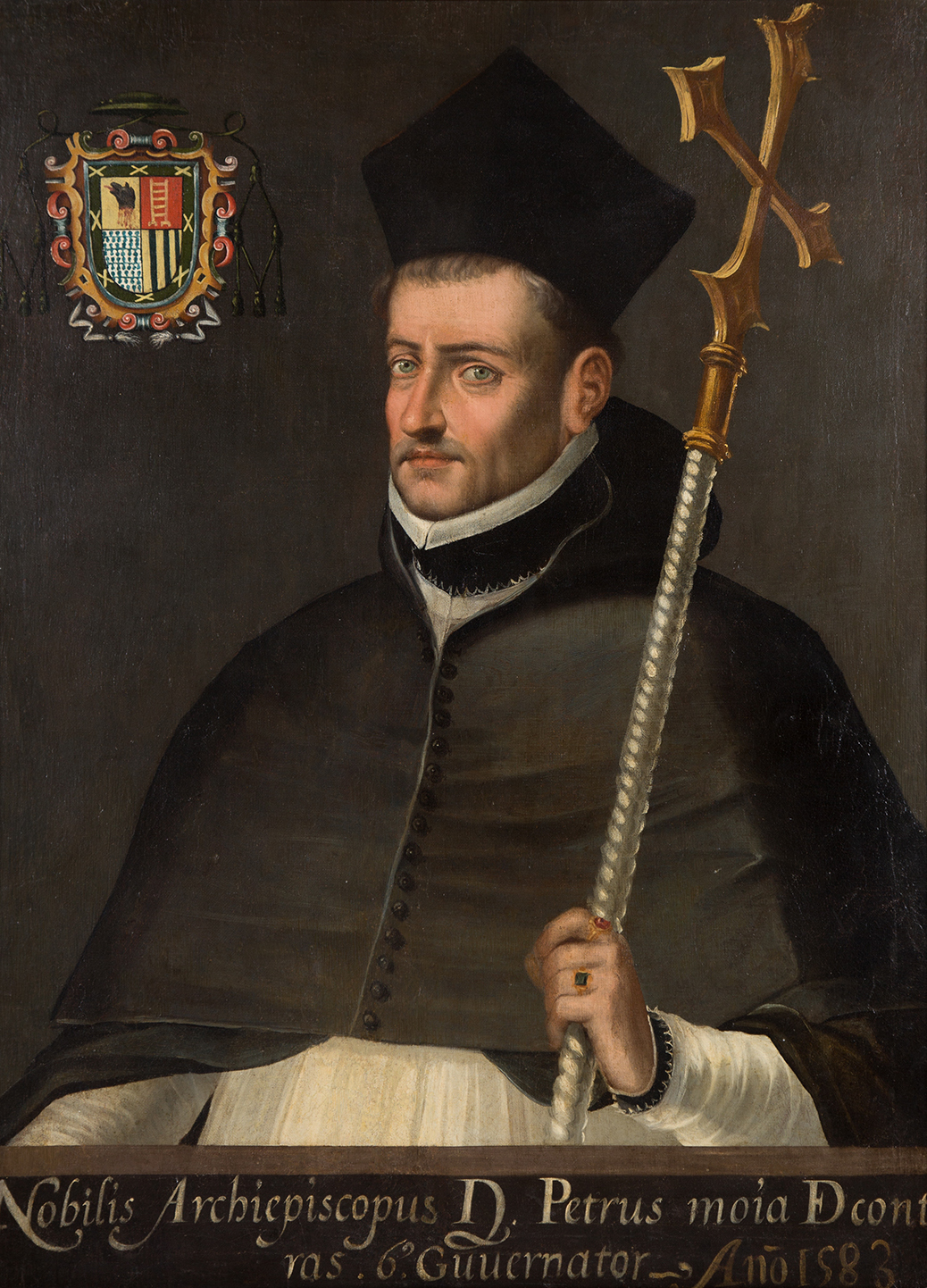
Pedro Moya de Contreras, former archbishop of Mexico, President of the Council of the Indies

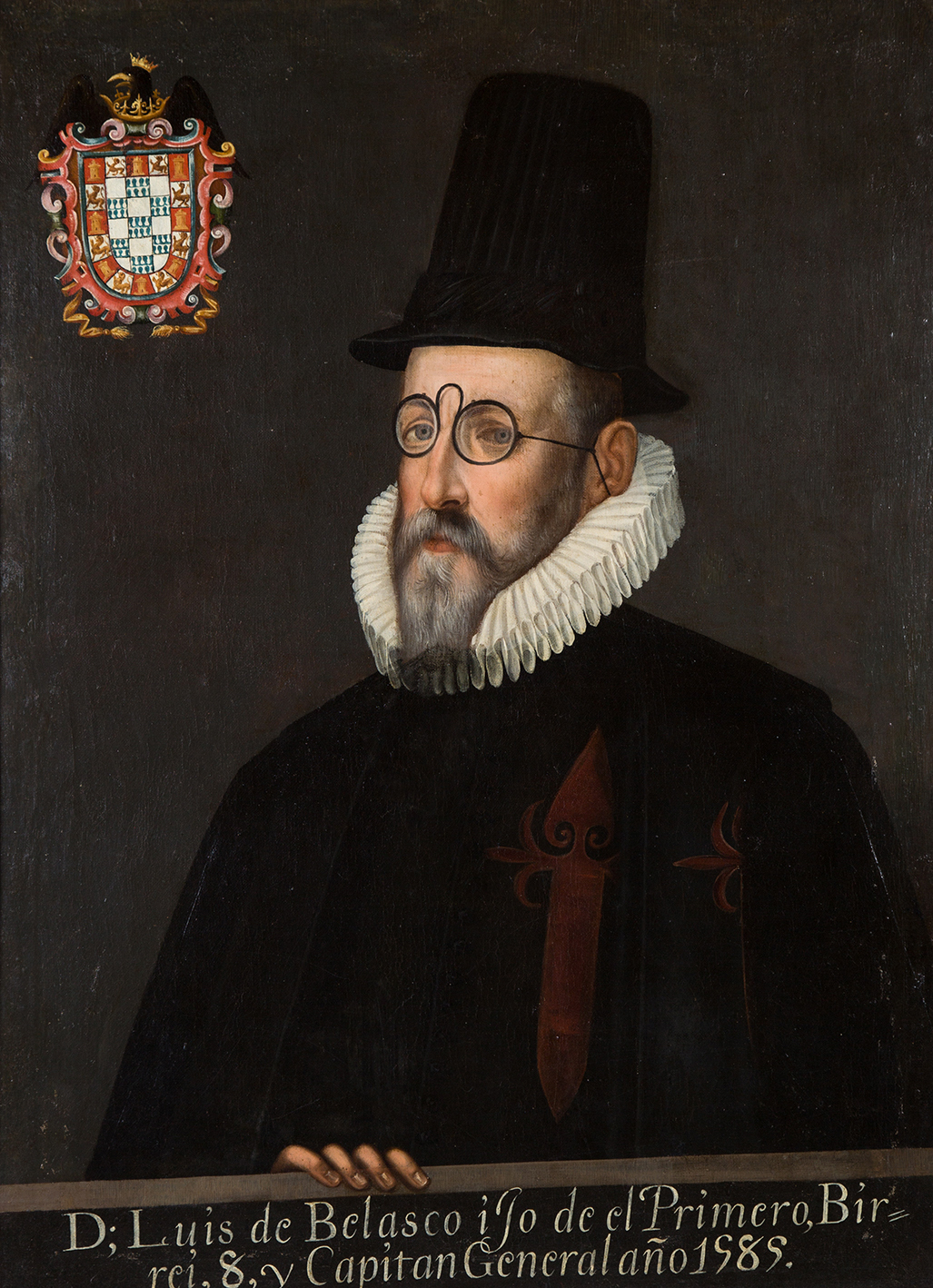
Luis de Velasco, 1st Marquess of Salinas del Río Pisuerga, Viceroy of New Spain and of Peru, later President of the Council of the Indies

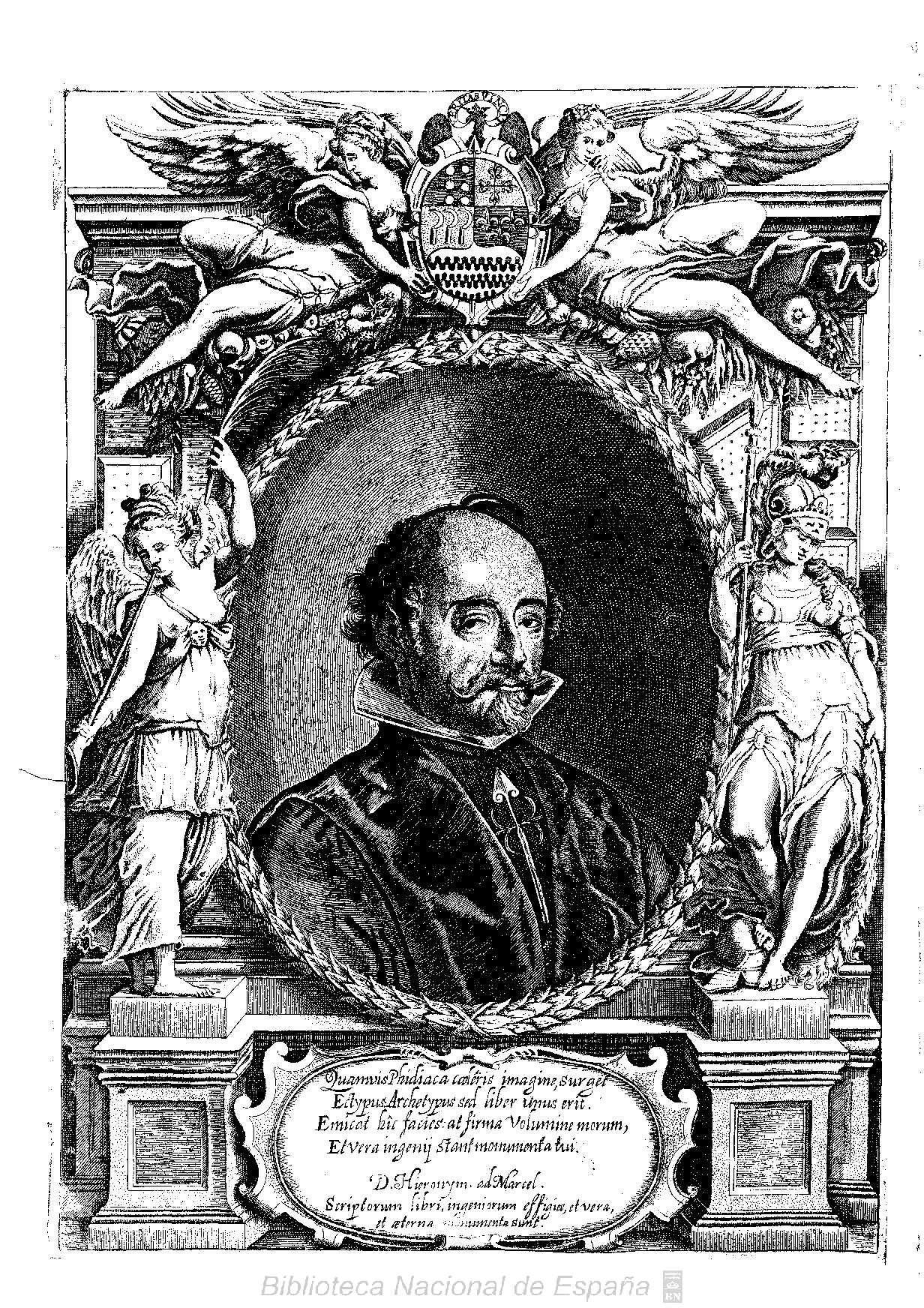
Juan de Solórzano Pereira, member of the Council of the Indies.

Isabella I had initially granted extensive authority to Christopher Columbus, but then withdrew that authority and established direct royal control in 1493, putting matters concerning the Indies in the hands of her chaplain, Juan Rodríguez de Fonseca. The Catholic Monarchs (Isabella and Ferdinand) had had Rodríguez de Fonseca study problems related to the colonization process arising from what was seen as the tyrannical behavior of Governor Christopher Columbus and his misgovernment of indigenous peoples and Iberian settlers. Rodríguez de Fonseca effectively became minister for the Indies and laid the foundations for the creation of a colonial bureaucracy. He presided over a committee or council, which contained a number of members of the Council of Castile (Consejo de Castilla), and formed a Junta de Indias of about eight counselors. Charles V, Holy Roman Emperor was already using the term "Council of the Indies" in 1519.

=== 16th century ===
The Council of the Indies was formally created on August 1, 1524. The king was informed weekly, and sometimes daily, of decisions reached by the Council, which came to exercise supreme authority over the Indies at the local level and over the Casa de Contratación ("House of Trade") founded in 1503 at Seville as a customs storehouse for the Indies. Civil suits of sufficient importance could be appealed from an audiencia in the New World to the Council, functioning as a court of last resort. There were two secretaries of the Council, one in charge of the Viceroyalty of New Spain, encompassing Mexico, Nueva Galicia, Guatemala, Hispaniola, Martinica and their dependencies in the Spanish East Indies; the other in charge of Peru, Chile, Tierra Firme (northern South America), and the New Kingdom of Granada. The name of the Council did not change with the addition of the indias orientales of the East Indies and other Pacific territories claimed by Spain to the original indias occidentales.

Internecine fighting and political instability in Peru and the untiring efforts of Bartolomé de las Casas on behalf of the natives' rights resulted in Charles's overhaul of the structure of the Council in 1542 with issuing of the "New Laws", which put limits on the rights of Spanish holders of encomiendas, grants of indigenous labor. Under Charles II the Council undertook the project to formally codify the large volume of Council and Crown's decisions and legislation for the Indies in the 1680 publication, the Laws of the Indies (es:Recopilación de las Leyes de Indias) and re-codified in 1791.

The Council of the Indies was usually headed by an ecclesiastic, but the councilors were generally non-clerics trained in law. In later years, nobles and royal favorites were in the ranks of councilors, as well as men who had experience in the high courts (Audiencias) of the Indies. A key example of such an experienced councilor was Juan de Solórzano Pereira, author of Política Indiana, who served in Peru prior to being named to the Council of the Indies and led the project on the Laws of the Indies. Other noteworthy Presidents of the Council were es:Francisco Tello de Sandoval; es:Juan de Ovando y Godoy; Pedro Moya de Contreras, former archbishop of Mexico; and Luis de Velasco, marqués de Salinas, former viceroy of both Mexico and Peru.

Although initially the Council had responsibility for all aspects of the Indies, under Philip II the financial aspects of the empire were shifted to the Council of Finance in 1556–57, a source of conflict between the two councils, especially since Spanish America came to be the source of the empire's wealth. When the Holy Office of the Inquisition was established as an institution in Mexico and Lima in the 1570s, the Council of the Indies was removed from control. The head of the Supreme Council of the Inquisition, Juan de Ovando y Godoy became president of the Council of the Indies 1571–75. He was appalled by the ignorance of the Indies by those serving on the Council. He sought the creation of a general description of the territories, which was never completed, but the Relaciones geográficas were the result of that project.

The height of the Council's power was in the sixteenth century. Its power declined and the quality of the councillors decreased. In the final years of the Habsburg dynasty, some appointments were sold or were accorded to people obviously unqualified, such as a nine-year-old boy, whose father had rendered services to the crown.

=== 17th century ===
A Royal Decree dated August 25, 1600, endorsed by the secretary Pedro Franqueza, favorite of Lerma, established a Chamber of the Indies, similar to the Chamber of Castile. The first three counselors to form the Chamber of the Indies were Álvarez de Toledo, Aponte, and Molina de Medrano, whose titles were issued on January 19, 1601. Alonso Molina de Medrano took his oath as the first chamberlain of the Indies five days later.

=== 18th century ===
With the ascension of the Bourbon dynasty at the start of the eighteenth century, a series of administrative changes, known as the Bourbon reforms, were introduced. In 1714 Philip V created a Secretariat of the Navy and the Indies (Secretaría de Marina e Indias) with a single Minister of the Indies, which superseded the administrative functions of the Council, although the Council continued to function in a secondary role until the nineteenth century. Fifty years later Charles III set up a separate Secretary of State for the Indies (Secretarío del Estado del Despacho Universal de Indias). In the late eighteenth century, the Council became powerful and prestigious again, with a great number of well qualified councillors with experience in the Indies.

=== 19th century ===
In 1808 Napoleon invaded Spain and placed his brother, Joseph Bonaparte on the throne. The Cortes of Cádiz, the body many Spaniards considered the legitimate government in Spain and its overseas territories in the absence of their Bourbon monarch, abolished the Council in 1812. It was restored in 1814 upon Ferdinand VII's restoration, and the autocratic monarch appointed a great number of councillors with American experience. The Council was finally abolished in 1834, a year after Ferdinand VII's death and after most of Spain's empire in the Americas declared independence.

=== General Archive of the Indies ===
The archives of the Council, the General Archive of the Indies (Spanish: Archivo General de Indias) one of the major centers of documentation for Spanish, Spanish American, and European history, are housed in Seville.

== See also ==
- Secretary of State (Ancient Regime in Spain)
- Provincial deputation in Spanish America
- Casa de Contratación
- Spanish colonization of the Americas
- for the Portuguese Empire: Casa da Índia
- Gracias al Sacar
