= Council of Portugal =

Ruling body of Portugal during the Iberian Union

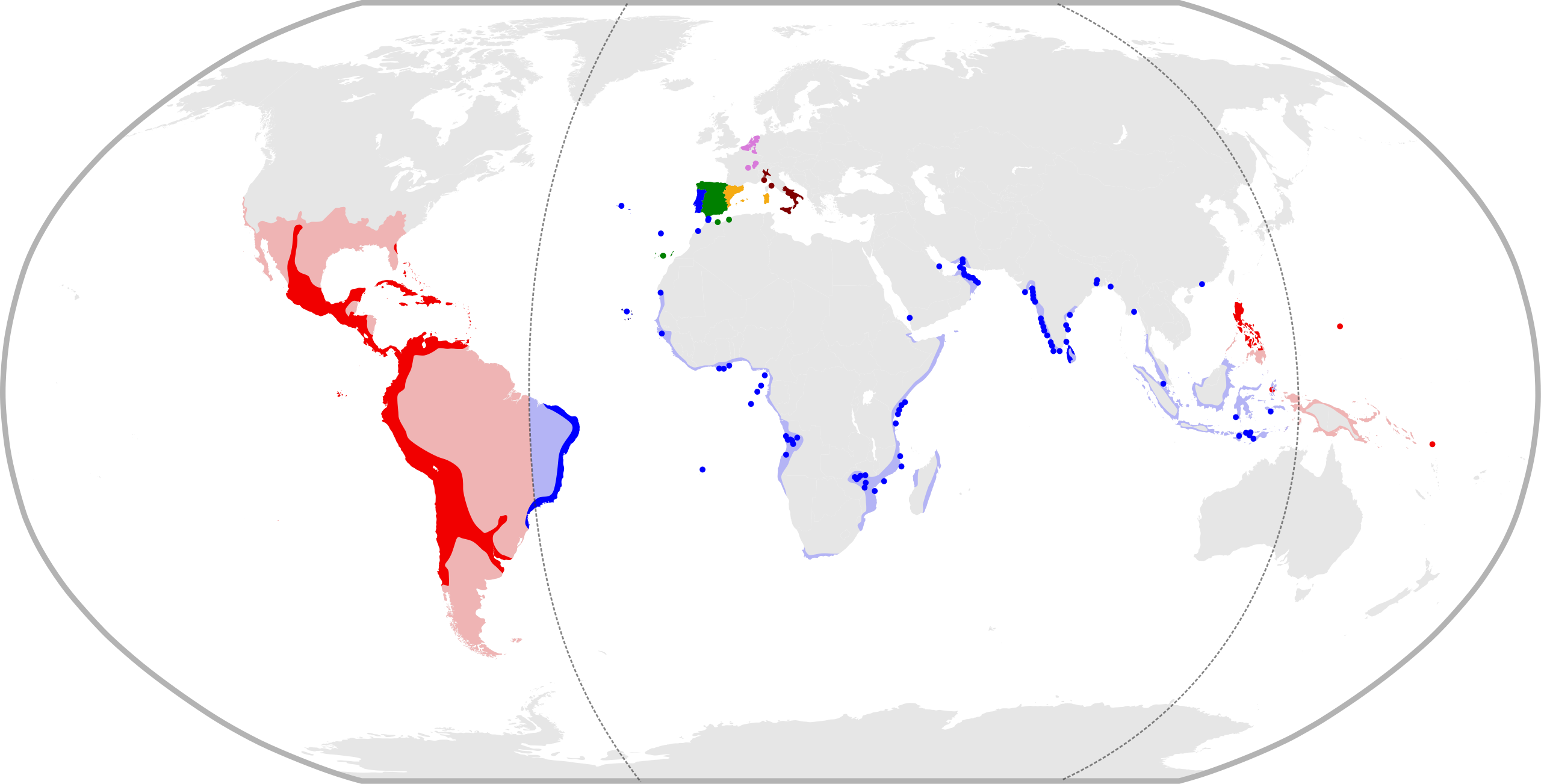
Map of the Spanish-Portuguese Empire in 1598 Territories administered by the Council of Castile Territories administered by the Council of Aragon Territories administered by the Council of Portugal Territories administered by the Council of Italy Territories administered by the Council of the Indies Territories appointed to the Council of Flanders

The Council of Portugal, officially the Royal and Supreme Council of Portugal (Portuguese: Real e Supremo Conselho de Portugal), was the ruling body and a key part of the government of the Kingdom of Portugal during the Iberian Union. The council was founded in 1582 by King Filipe I of Portugal following the model of the Council of Castile. It provided Portugal with a large degree of autonomy from the House of Habsburg.

Apart from administering the Kingdom of Portugal and the Algarves, the council administered Portugal's colonial empire.

The council ceased to exist after the conclusion of the Portuguese Restoration War in 1668.

== See also ==
- History of Portugal
- History of Spain
