= Supreme Council of Flanders =

Governing institution in the Spanish Empire

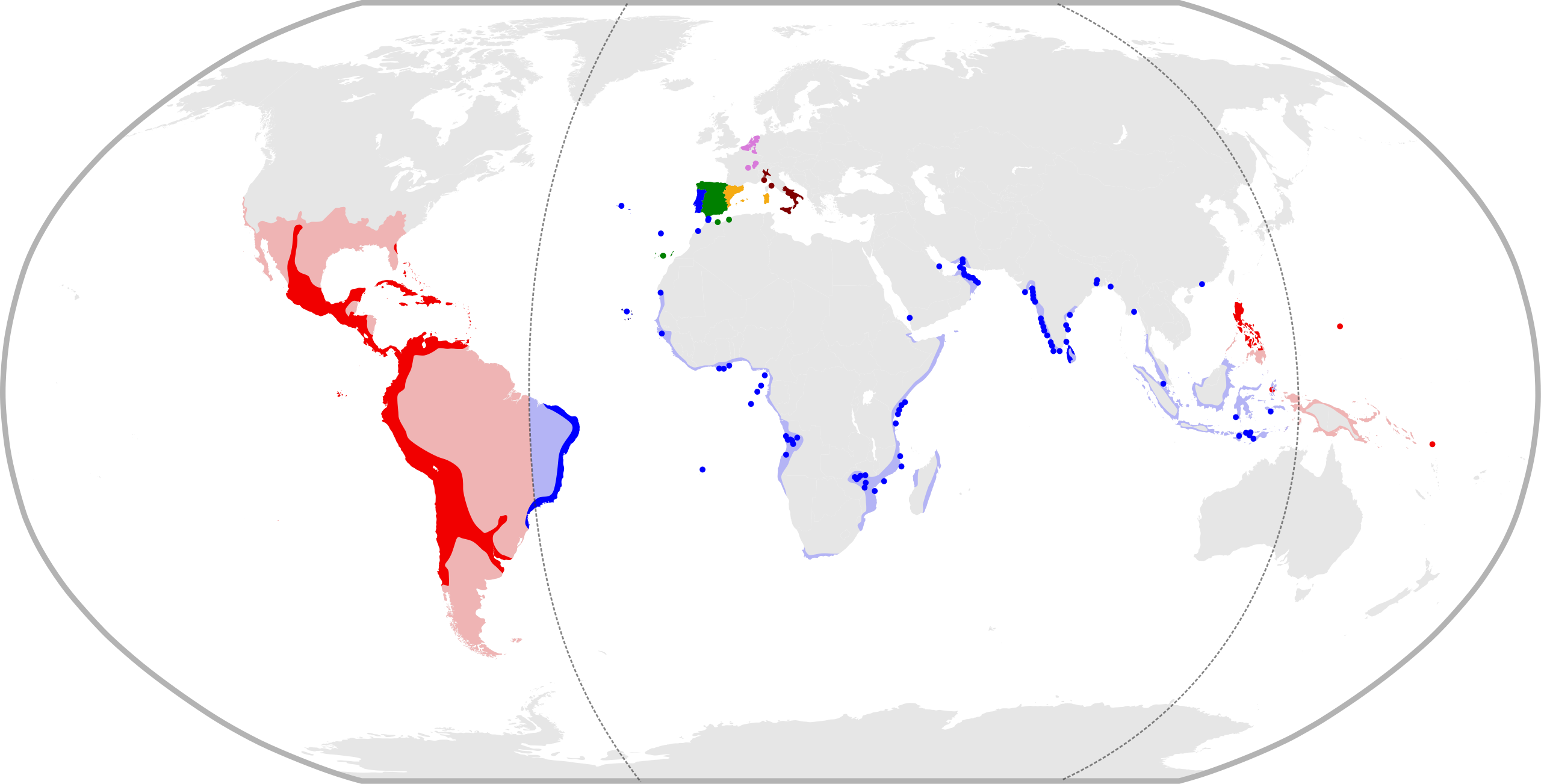
Map of the Spanish-Portuguese Empire in 1598. Territories administered by the Council of Castile Territories administered by the Council of Aragon Territories administered by the Council of Portugal Territories administered by the Council of Italy Territories administered by the Council of the Indies Territories appointed to the Council of Flanders

The Supreme Council of Flanders and Burgundy (Consejo Supremo de Flandes y Borgoña, or simply Consejo de Flandes) was a governing institution in the Spanish Empire, responsible for advising the king of Spain on the exercise of his prerogatives in the Spanish Netherlands and (until 1678) the County of Burgundy. This was a territory that comprised most of the modern states of Belgium and Luxembourg, as well as parts of northern France, the southern Netherlands, and western Germany. The council typically sat in Madrid, and its advice usually concerned royal nominations to ecclesiastical benefices, the appointment of high officials, royal pardons, and awards of honours such as knighthoods and noble titles.

== History ==
The Supreme Council of Flanders was first founded in 1588, under Philip II of Spain, but was disbanded at his death, when the sovereignty of the Spanish Netherlands passed to Albert VII of Austria, ruling on behalf of his wife, the Infanta Isabella. The council was re-established in 1627 under Philip IV of Spain. It was finally abolished in 1702.

The institution's archives are in the Archivo General de Simancas.

== Membership ==
When reinstituted in 1627, the council was intended to consist of six members assisted by two secretaries. Three of the members were to be jurists and three members of the high nobility, with at least one member to be a native of the Low Countries and one of the noblemen acting as president. The council was very seldom effectively at full strength.

=== President ===
- Diego Felípez de Guzmán, 1st Marquis of Leganés, 1628-1653
- Filippo Spinola, 2nd Marquis of Los Balbases, 1653-1659
- Antonio Sancho Davila, Marquis of Velada, 1660-1666

=== Secretary ===
- Gabriel de Roy, knight, 1627-1645
- Jean Hernart, 1627-1631
- Juan Osvaldo de Brito, 1628-1637
- Jacques Brecht, 1638-1660
- Jean Vecquer, or Weckert, 1660-1673

=== Councillor ===
- Jean de Croÿ, Count of Solre, 1627-1640
- Pieter Roose, 1630-1632
- Jean de Gaverelles, 1633-1645
- Robert van Asseliers, 1639/40—1652
- Antoon De Vulder, 1639/40-1644
- Antoine Brun, 1642-1654
- Michel de Coxie, knight, 1652-1660
- Boudewijn Van der Piet, 1652-1658
- Aurele Augustin Van Male, 1660-1662
- Charles de Watteville, 1660-1670
- Koenraad Van der Brughen, 1661-1662
- Jean-Antoine Locquet, 1663-1669
- Jean-Baptiste de Brouchoven, Count of Bergeyck, 1663-1681
- Simon de Fierlant, 1663-1668
- Esteban de Gamarra y Contreras, 1663-1671
