= Composite monarchy =

State consisting of several countries under one ruler

A composite monarchy (or composite state) is a historical category that describes early modern states consisting of several countries under one ruler, sometimes designated as a personal union, who governs their territories as if they were separate kingdoms, in accordance with local traditions and legal structures. The composite state became the most common type of state in the late medieval and early modern era in Europe. The term was introduced by H. G. Koenigsberger in 1975 and popularised by Sir John H. Elliott in 1992. Koenigsberger divides composite states into two classes: those, like the Spanish Empire, that consisted of countries separated by either other states or by the sea, and those, like Poland–Lithuania, that were contiguous.

A medieval example of a composite monarchy was the Angevin Empire. Theorists of the 16th century believed that "conformity" (similarity in language and customs) was important to success of a composite state. Francesco Guicciardini praised the acquisition of the Kingdom of Navarre by the King of Aragon in 1512 on account of their conformità. Yet, differences could be persistent. Navarre retained its own law and customs separate from the rest of Spain down to 1841. In France, a far more unified state than Spain in the early modern period, the state was divided into different customary tax regimes, the pays d'élection and pays d'état. This was abolished during the 1789 Revolution. The Holy Roman Empire consisted of hundreds of imperial immediate states nicknamed Kleinstaaterei. Most sovereign kings in Europe held fiefs in the HRE in a personal union at some point. The different holdings of a dynasty are called Hausmacht and were in most cases not contiguous.

The 17th-century Spanish jurist Juan de Solórzano Pereira distinguished a state whose components were aeque principaliter (equally important) from an "accessory" union in which a newly acquired territory was subsumed under the laws of an already existing one, such as when New Spain was incorporated into the Crown of Castile, or when Wales was joined to the Kingdom of England.

== History ==
Composite monarchies were common during the early 15th century to the early to mid 18th century in Europe. A composite monarchy involved the unification of several diverse local territories under one ruler. There are two types of composite monarchy proposed by Sir John H. Elliott, "accessory" union and "aeque principali". The first type of composite monarchy involved a unification where the united territories share the same laws and are regarded as the same jurisdiction. The second arrangement involved the preservation of local customs and power structures. These structures were ruled by a central ruler who either only broadly created state policy with deference to local rule and respect for local religious cultural and political customs; or where there was a more significant central role, negotiated the rules for each territory separately in respect and in consideration of local traditions and customs. In the second approach, each territory was governed as though “…the king who [governs them all] were king only of each one of them”. This method of rule meant intervention of the central government or ruler was infrequent or allowed diverse customs and legal arrangements to coexist. This allowed classes, ethnicities and traditions to exist peaceably in a larger political unit without significant conflict. The monarch attempted in each case to ensure the "guarantee of preserving peace, order and justice, and to care for the poor."

Most of Europe during the early modern period was governed under arrangements that can be described as composite monarchies. Diversity in arrangements was essential to ensure the unity of composite kingdoms, as they were often very diverse. Composite monarchies in the early modern period united diverse territories; while in some cases the unification of territories led to the establishment of nation-states in the modern world, in other cases composite territories did not become a unified nation state. Even in the most unified composite kingdom at the time, France, a majority of subjects did not speak the French language. This demonstrates the extent of diversity even in places considered homogeneous. The Ottoman Empire, the Holy Roman Empire, the Crowns of Castile and Aragon, the Kingdom of France, and the early modern predecessors of the United Kingdom (England and Wales, Scotland, and the Kingdom of Ireland) are prominent examples of composite rule.

== Examples ==
=== Ottoman Empire ===
Remnants of the Byzantine Empire from Eastern Europe were united under Ottoman Sultan Mehmed II by 1453, and the empire incorporated a vast collection of territories surrounding the Mediterranean. The Ottoman Sultan had succeeded in “superimposing” the Byzantine empire with Ottoman Rule. Ottoman lands contained a wide variety of cultural, legal and religious traditions.

The Ottomans maintained an aeque principali empire where local customs and traditional practices were perpetuated. In many cases, the Ottomans allowed subject peoples including Christians and Jews to have their own communities where their own particular laws and customs were retained and integrated into the broader Ottoman system; which often included separate legal codes for each territory. This approach is similar to the approaches of other composite monarchies except that the Ottoman territories included a more diverse population. Unlike most European examples, the Ottoman ruling class included a wide variety of people and cultural traditions. Entrance to the Ottoman ruling class was not exclusively by birth, but many other cultural and linguistic traditions were included as long as they were Muslim and had deep knowledge of the Ottoman court ways.

The Ottoman Empire's most striking difference with other composite monarchies in Europe was that it allowed religious freedom to a greater extent than the Europeans did. The Ottomans did not require that their subjects adhere to the religion of the monarch, a requirement that usually was a major part of composite kingdoms. The Ottoman Empire was diverse relatively to Europe and some historians argue there were minor restrictions on the freedom of minority groups. Christians, Muslims, Jews, Turks, Greeks, Hungarians, Arabs, Armenians, Kurds, guildsmen, and bureaucrats were free to work and live throughout the empire without major hassle. However, others argue the forced abduction of children for the Ottoman military in the Janissary Corps or the practice of forced relocation of ethnic minorities betray a less positive policy in the Ottoman Empire towards internal polities, particularly those considered suitable for these measures by the Ottoman court.

=== Spanish Monarchy ===
Early modern Spain was an example of a composite monarchy based on the aeque principali approach. The Spanish approach involved separate administrative and taxation arrangements for each territory. Composite monarchy in Spain started with the Reconquista and the marriage of Isabella of Castile and Ferdinand of Aragon, the Catholic Monarchs in the late fifteenth century, which united through a dynastic union, a form of federation, the Crown of Castille and the Crown of Aragon.

Throughout much of the early modern period, each Spanish realm retained its own freedoms and laws, and this included administrative and governance arrangements, different monetary systems and borders. Modes of taxation are an excellent example of the differing arrangements in the Spanish composite monarchy. The system of taxation in Spain varied depending on the kingdom or territory, and sometimes even within kingdoms there were special tax arrangements. The differing tax arrangements led to a reliance on the revenues from the Crown of Castile as opposed to other lands of Spain. While all of Spain was united under the same ruler, each territory was often treated very differently and was ruled by the King and central administrators in line with their power structures.

Monarchical rule in early modern Spain was a balancing act, as the monarch attempted to preserve unity and loyalty among each part, which required placating local interests. The approach toward governing each of the Spanish territories was to negotiate to determine the needs of different societal groups within the territory and then to govern based on the consensus achieved. Composite rule in Spain involved consultation and negotiation between central state officials and each territory individually, often resulting in different agreements and laws for each territory. The composite and diverse nature of monarchical rule in Spain also included the diversity of social classes and the bargaining power that they had versus the central government. Diversity of social classes further complicated Spanish composite rule. The central government had to take into account not only peculiarities in local customs and institutions but also local variations in social structure and the interests of the social structure. In the case of the practice of hoarding in Barcelona, the interests of the Guilds and artisan estate differed from the interests of the clergy and nobility. These differing interests also required resolution from the monarch and his central administrators.

==== Crown of Aragon ====
The Crown of Aragon was itself a composite monarchy, being an aeque principali union of states (Kingdom of Aragon, Principality of Catalonia, Kingdom of Valencia and Kingdom of Majorca) which developed different laws, tax and monetary systems, governments and parliaments from each other, and were not united politically except at the level of the king, who had to deal separately with their different Courts, vow them loyalty and request their financial help. In the Principality of Catalonia, the Catalan Courts had legislative power, and laws could only be made and repealed by mutual consent of King and Courts. In 1519, the Catalan Courts met in Barcelona to recognize the first unified monarch of the crowns of Castile and Aragon, Charles I, and to discuss the granting of financial assistance to the King.

Although the King had no legislative power, he had the privilege to request papal bulls, and used that privilege to undermine the strength of local elites when it seemed convenient. For example, in the case of the petitions of papal bulls against hoarding to favor popular classes, the King took opposed decisions regarding the Principality of Catalonia and the Kingdom of Aragon: "In 1582 he favoured the demands of Catalonia’s elites over those of Barcelona’s artisans, but under different circumstances he took the opposite stance in Aragon.", due to worsening relations between the Spanish monarchy and the Aragonese nobility, which was accused of "protecting bandits".

=== England, Wales, Ireland, and Scotland ===
The early modern predecessors of the United Kingdom (England and Wales, Ireland and later including Scotland) included both an accessory union and aeque principali union.

The union between England and Wales was an accessory union. English rules and laws were granted to Wales in the Acts of Union of 1536 and 1543, and Wales was thus absorbed into the Kingdom of England.

The Lordship and later Kingdom of Ireland were ruled separately in a personal union with the Kingdom of England (and Scotland after 1603; Great Britain after 1707) until they were legally united by the Acts of Union 1800, forming the United Kingdom of Great Britain and Ireland. Ireland retained its own legal system, which continues today as Northern Irish Law.

The Kingdoms of England and Ireland were united with Scotland in a personal union from 1603 (Union of the crowns). England and Scotland were legally united by the Acts of Union 1707, forming the Kingdom of Great Britain. However, this union preserved institutions, customs and legal traditions peculiar to Scotland. For example, the Church of Scotland (Presbyterian Church) and Scots law were preserved, while no separate church or legal system for Wales remained. England and Wales integrated, while Scotland retained many of its unique institutions and traditions.

To this day, England and Wales, Scotland and Northern Ireland (the majority of Ireland broke away as the Irish Free State in 1922, which later became the modern Republic of Ireland) remain separate legal jurisdictions within the UK.

There are also three Crown dependencies of the UK – the Isle of Man, the Bailiwick of Jersey and the Bailiwick of Guernsey – for which the British monarch is responsible but which have not had formal Acts of Union.

=== Holy Roman Empire ===
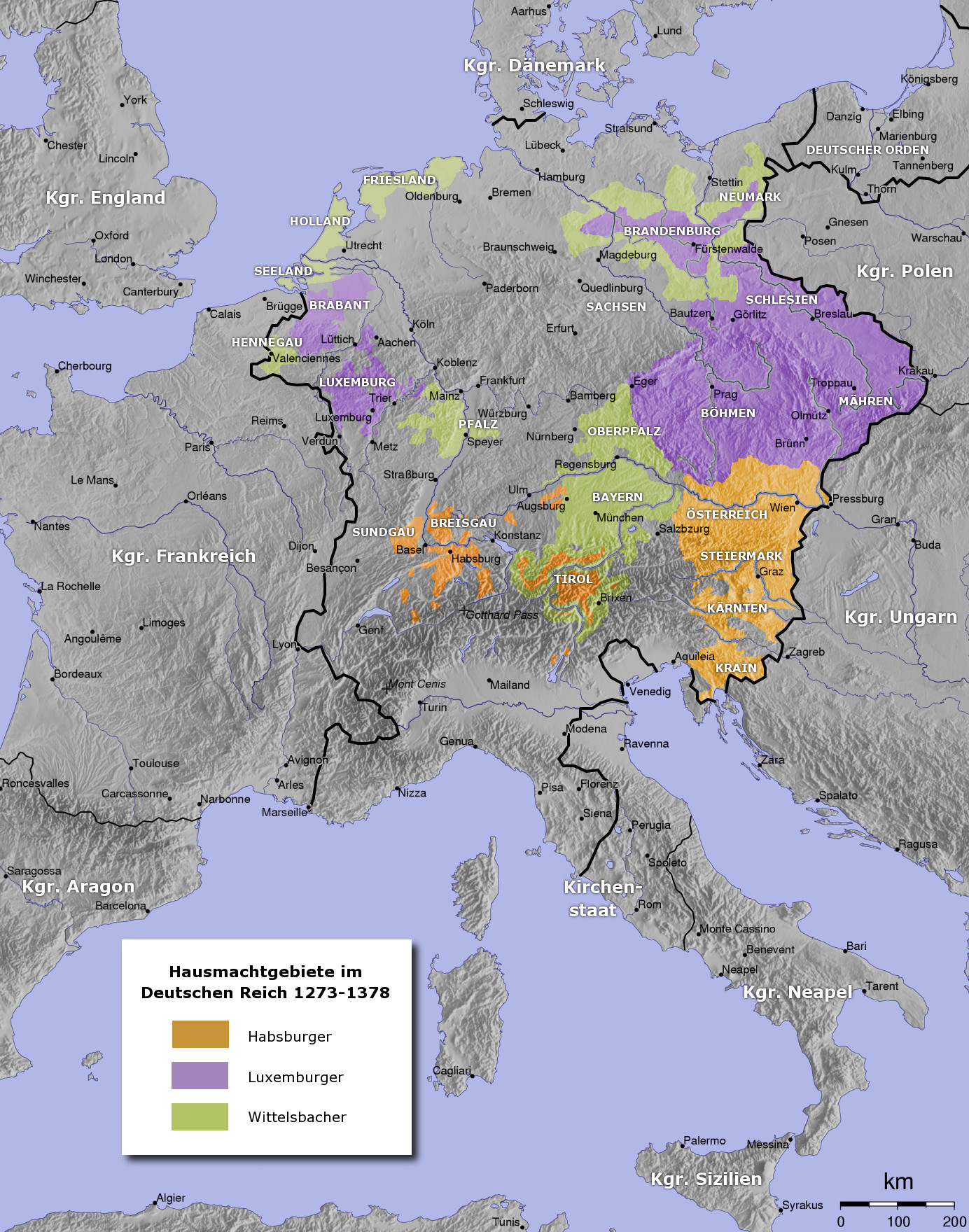
Hausmacht of the important families of the Holy Roman Empire from 1273 to 1378: Habsburg lands Luxembourg lands Wittelsbach lands

In the High and Late Medieval Period, the empire began to fragment in a process called Territorialisierung. Eventually, hundreds of small states (Kleinstaaterei) were granted imperial immediacy and most families controlled a variety of disconnected territories as their Hausmacht.

Similar to the Angevin Empire, many kings were vassals of the Holy Roman Emperor at the same time. The Duchy of Holstein was in a personal union with the Denmark, Pomerania with Sweden since 1630, Duchy of Milan with France during the Italian Wars, Poland-Lithuania was in a union with the Electorate of Saxony for most of the 18th century and the Habsburgs ruled over Spain, Portugal and Hungary as kings while holding the Southern Netherlands and Austria within the empire. The domain of the Austrian line is usually referred to as Habsburg monarchy. Brandenburg-Preußen, consisting of the Duchy of Prussia and Electorate of Brandenburg among other minor territories, was also a composite monarchy. In 1701, the emperor allowed the Duke of Prussia to adopt the title King in Prussia as he was also Elector of Brandenburg within the empire. The German Confederation and North German Confederation would inherit this partial membership.

The personal union between the United Kingdom of Great Britain and Ireland and Hanover, jointly ruled by the head of the House of Hanover since 1707, ended with the death of William IV in 1837, and was replaced with a dynastic union: due to the different laws of succession, he was succeeded by two members of the dynasty, in the United Kingdom by his niece Victoria, the daughter of his late next brother Prince Edward, Duke of Kent and Strathearn, and in Hanover by his second next brother Ernest Augustus. This lasted until the annexation of Hanover by Prussia in 1866.

In the border regions of the HRE and the Kingdom of France, some nobles were vassals of both monarchs. The Burgundian State was a composite monarchy as it was a collection of territories with different institutions. The Dauphiné (nominally part of the Burgundian realm of the HRE) was given to the heir apparent of France, le Dauphin, after it fell to the French domaine royal to avoid vassalization.

== See also ==
- Dynastic union
- Territorial state § Personenverbandsstaat

== Sources ==
- Corteguera L.,"Popular Politics in Composite Monarchies: Barcelona Artisans and the Campaign for a Papal Bull Against Hoarding (1580-5)" in Social History, Volume 26, Issue 1, January 2001, pp. 22–39.
- Elliott, J. H. (1992). "A Europe of Composite Monarchies". Past & Present (The Cultural and Political Construction of Europe): 48–71. doi:10.1093/past/137.1.48.
- Encyclopædia Britannica "Classical Ottoman society and administration"
- Goffman, D., and Stroop, C., "Empire As Composite: The Ottoman Polity and the Typology of Dominion." In Imperialisms: Historical and Literary Investigations, 1500–1900. Eds. Balachandra Rajan and Elizabeth Sauer. New York: Palgrave Macmillan, 2004. p. 129-145.
- Hayton, D. W.; Kelly, James (2010). "The Irish Parliament in European Context: A Representative Institution in a Composite State". In D. W. Hayton; James Kelly; John Bergin (eds.). The Eighteenth-Century Composite State: Representative Institutions in Ireland and Europe, 1689–1800. Palgrave Macmillan. pp. 3–20. ISBN 9780230231597.
- Irigoin A., Grafe R., "Bargaining for Absolutism: A Spanish Path to Nation-State and Empire Building" in Hispanic American Historical Review, Vol. 88, No. 2, 2008. pp. 173–209
- Koenigsberger, H. G. (1978). "Monarchies and Parliaments in Early Modern Europe: Dominium Regale or Dominium Politicum et Regale". Theory and Society. 5 (1): 191–217. doi:10.1007/BF01702161. S2CID 141470545.
- Koenigsberger, H. G. (2007). "Composite States, Representative Institutions and the American Revolution". Historical Research. 62 (148): 135–53. doi:10.1111/j.1468-2281.1989.tb00507.x.
- Srodecki, Paul; Kersken, Norbert; Petrauskas, Rimvydas, eds. (2023). Unions and Divisions: New Forms of Rule in Medieval and Renaissance Europe (First ed.). London and New York, NY: Routledge. ISBN 978-1-032-05750-7.
- Stein, Robert (2017). Magnanimous Dukes and Rising States: The Unification of the Burgundian Netherlands, 1380-1480. Oxford University Press. ISBN 978-0-19-875710-8.
