= Council of Italy =

Former part of the Spanish Empire

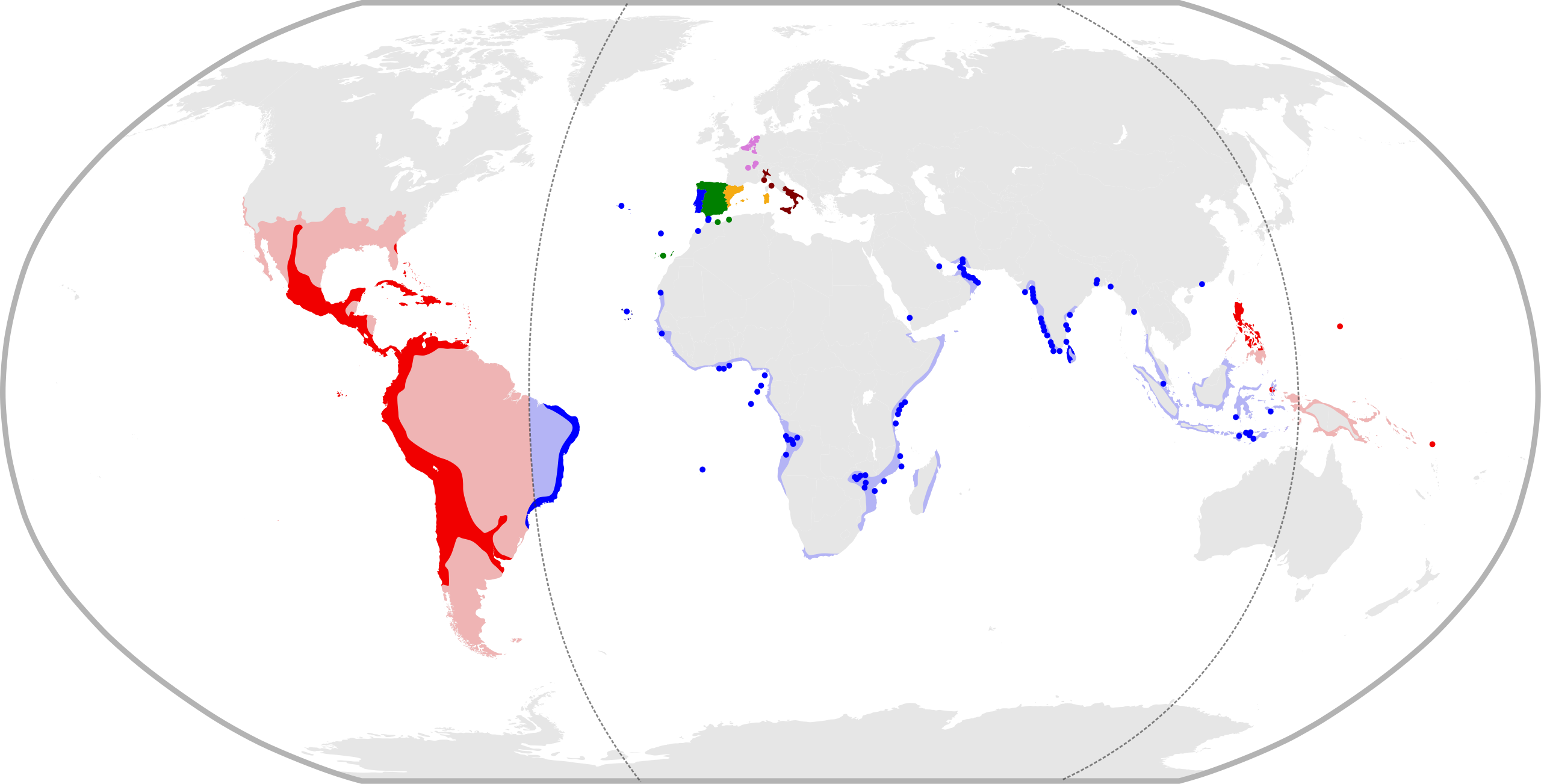
Map of the Spanish Empire in 1600. Territories administered by the Council of Castile Territories administered by the Council of Aragon Territories administered by the Council of Portugal Territories administered by the Council of Italy Territories administered by the Council of the Indies Territories appointed to the Council of Flanders

The Council of Italy, officially the Royal and Supreme Council of Italy (Spanish: Real y Supremo Consejo de Italia, Italian: Reale e Supremo Consiglio d'Italia), was a ruling body and key part of the government of the Spanish Empire in Europe, second only to the monarch himself. It was based in Madrid and administered the Spanish territories in Italy: the Kingdom of Naples, Kingdom of Sicily, Duchy of Milan, State of the Presidi, Marquisate of Finale (until 1713) and other minor territories.

Before the 1556 creation of the Council due to the historical rule of the Crown of Aragon over most of the territories, Spanish possessions in Italy were administered by the Council of Aragon.

== History ==
By the year 1556, the Crown of Aragon had complete dominance over Southern Italy and the Duchy of Milan. Local councils and viceroys (in Naples and Palermo) or governors (in Milan) controlled the internal affairs of these lands. In an effort to better coordinate Spanish rule in Italy, Philip II decided to separate the Italian states from the Council of Aragon in 1556. Thus, Naples, Sicily and Milan were incorporated into the newly created Council of Italy and were represented by two regents each (one Castilian, one native-born).

The Kingdom of Sardinia remained under the jurisdiction of the Council of Aragon, as demanded and claimed by its own Stamenti on the basis of political, religious, geographical, linguistic and anthropological affinities, until its eventual transfer to Austria and later to the House of Savoy.

In 1713, Emperor Charles VI established a "Supreme Council of Spain" with its seat in Vienna, in order to assert his sovereignty over all the formerly Spanish ruled states transferred to the Austrian Habsburgs after the War of the Spanish Succession. The Council of Italy, left without any territories to govern, was abolished by Philip V of Spain on 1 May 1717.

== Structure ==
The Council of Italy consisted of:

- One President, chosen from the Spanish high nobility;
- Six Regents, two for the Kingdom of Sicily, two for the Kingdom of Naples, and two for the Duchy of Milan. For each of these territories, one of the regents was Spanish and the other was a naturale, i.e. native of the territory. Both were to be leetrados, that is experts in utroque iure (canon law and civil law).
- Several officials stations in their dependencies, including three secretaries (one for each possession), a Fiscal advocate who managed the interests of the state, and a Conservator General of the Patrimony who managed the administration of the crown's patrimony.

== Functions ==
The Council of Italy was responsible for all affairs of state and law concerning the Italian states governed by the Habsburg main line. It nominated the viceroys of Sicily, viceroys of Naples, and the Governors of the Duchy of Milan to the Spanish Council of State which was presided over by the king, and it approved the more important civil and military appointments in the individual states. The council's functions were solely consultative. Its opinion was reported in a document (consulta), edited by the secretary, which was then submitted to the king, who then annotated it with his own decision. If there was no unanimous decision in the council, the opinions of different members were all reported.

== See also ==
- Kingdom of Naples
- Kingdom of Sicily
- Duchy of Milan
- State of the Presidi
- Marquisate of Finale
- Italian War of 1551–59
