= Council of Castile =

Former part of the Spanish Empire

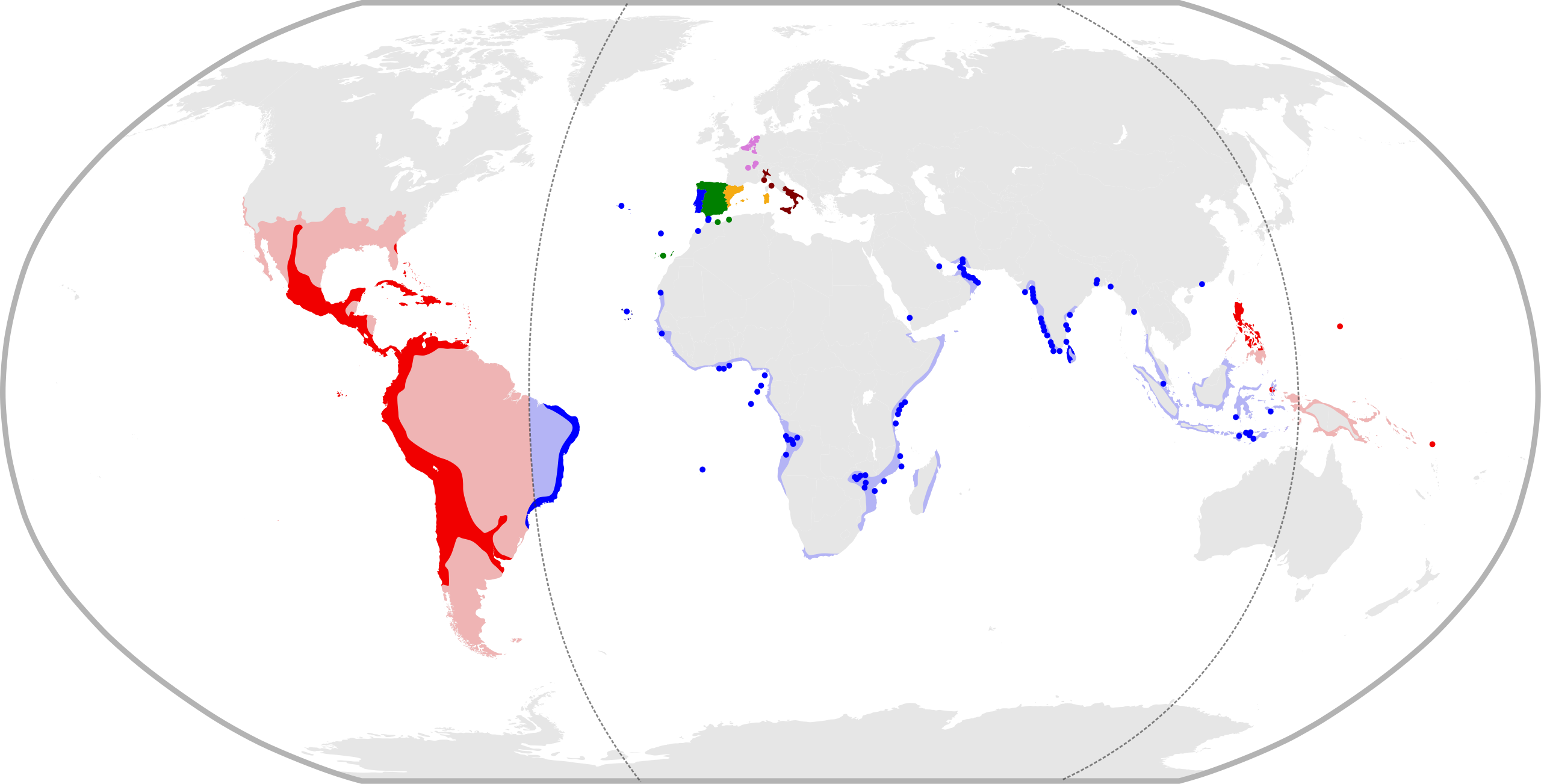
Map of the Spanish-Portuguese Empire in 1598. Territories administered by the Council of Castile Territories administered by the Council of Aragon Territories administered by the Council of Portugal Territories administered by the Council of Italy Territories administered by the Council of the Indies Territories administered by the Council of Flanders

The Council of Castile (Spanish: Real y Supremo Consejo de Castilla), known earlier as the Royal Council (Spanish: Consejo Real), was a ruling body and key part of the domestic government of the Crown of Castile, second only to the monarch himself.

It was established in 1480 under Queen Isabella I, as the chief body dealing with administrative and judicial matters of the realm. With the 1516 ascension of Charles I (later Charles V, Holy Roman Emperor) to the throne of both Castile and Aragon, the Royal Council came to be known as the Council of Castile because Charles was king of many dominions other than Castile, while the Council retained responsibility only over Castile.

During periods in which there was no monarch, or while the monarch was absent or incompetent, the Royal Council would rule in place of the monarch as a regency council. The Council weakened in the 19th century, during which it was abolished and re-established several times before being dissolved permanently.

== History ==
=== Origins ===
The earliest form of the Royal Council was created at the end of the fourteenth century in 1385 by John I of Castile after the disaster at the Battle of Aljubarrota. It consisted of 12 members, four from each of the clergy, the cities, and the nobility. In 1442 the nobility increased its influence on the council, adding many nobles as titular members of the council. Sixty became the new number of members.

=== Under the Catholic Monarchs: Centralization ===
This council was rather ineffective and the Catholic Monarchs, Ferdinand II of Aragon and Isabella I, sought to change it in their drive to centralize the country and bring it more firmly in line with national interests rather than those of the nobles. In 1480, they passed the Act of Resumption at the Cortes of Toledo. This act allowed Ferdinand and Isabella to directly appoint bureaucrats, rather than letting the independent and erratic nobles rule. The Royal Council would both control a royal army and manage tax disputes, which would place nobles more securely under the control of the Crown.

The reformed Council was composed of a president, a treasurer, a church prelate, three caballeros (often minor nobility), and between eight and ten letrados (lawyers or jurists). These were Council's chief duties:

- To advise the Crown on appointments, both military and civil;
- Until the creation of the Council of the Indies, to supervise works, projects, expeditions, and colonizations commissioned by the Castilian government, in the Old World and New World (Requerimiento);
- To offer consideration of and judgment to the Crown regarding the conferring of pensions, emoluments, and sundry favors;
- To serve as the supreme court of justice of the Crown of Castile;
- To have all members of the Council sign all legal documents that in any way effected the working of the Crown, including detailed, day-to-day governmental decisions.

In order to prevent it from falling under control of the great noble houses, as had happened with the original royal council, non-appointed nobles were allowed to attend Council meetings but were given no vote. The result of this meant that the council, and its bureaucracy, was composed chiefly of "new men": the minor nobility, townsmen, and civilian magistrates.

After Queen Isabella's death in 1504, the Royal Council began to grow corrupt and influenced by the nobility once more. Philip I was an ineffective ruler who only reigned two years; after him, the government theoretically fell to Ferdinand and Isabella's daughter, Queen Joanna of Castile, and her six-year-old son Charles of Ghent, the future Emperor Charles V. Joanna was considered incompetent, and Charles too young. Archbishop Francisco Jiménez de Cisneros ruled briefly as regent, but was undercut by noble schemes and spent much of his time simply trying to hold together the government.

Cisneros was then replaced by Joanna's father King Ferdinand II, whose claim to rule Castile with his wife's death was rather weak, but no other plausible choice than his being regent existed. Ferdinand was often an absent ruler of Castile, living in Aragon, and the Royal Council managed his affairs. During this period, it became even more corrupt and ineffectual. Nobles illegally expanded their domains by force, sending soldiers to "claim" land that was owned by the royal government or free peasants. The Council, corrupt and bribed, usually ignored these incidents, allowing nobles to freely enrich themselves at the cost of justice and the government.

=== Charles I of Habsburg: Revolt and reform ===
After Ferdinand's death in 1516, Cisneros served as regent again briefly, and then Charles I was crowned king now that he was of age. However, the young king was at the time almost completely controlled by Flemish advisors such as William de Croÿ, sieur de Chièvres, and he did not undertake any efforts to change the Council at first. Additionally, Charles' new government levied high taxes and demands on Castile, with its ambitions over all Europe. Charles was the king, becoming Charles V Holy Roman Emperor in 1519, of one of the largest empires, in European and world history - "The empire on which the sun never sets." The Bishop of Badajoz, Pedro Ruiz de la Mota, was an influential member of the Royal Council and declared to the Cortes of Corunna that Castile was to be the empire's "treasury and sword."

When Charles left Spain in 1520, the Revolt of the Comuneros broke out against royal government. Much of their complaints were against the Council. Representatives of Valladolid's radical parishes were unanimous in a statement blaming the Council's "bad government" for the kingdom's troubles. The Royal Council would lead the royalist forces against the rebels in Charles' absence. Charles left as regent the Dutch Cardinal Adrian of Utrecht, by most accounts a decent ruler saddled with a difficult situation. Much of the Royal Council agitated for vigorous punishment against the rebels, such as its hated president, Antonio de Rojas Manrique. These early reprisals would backfire, and intensified the revolt's spread.

Eventually, the rebels were defeated, but Charles (who had also matured and distanced himself from his earlier advisers) realized that the Council direly needed reform. Charles embarked upon a vigorous program to change the nature of the council, dismissing the unpopular Antonio de Rojas and replacing him with Juan Pardo de Tavera, the Archbishop of Santiago. He also added three new councilors, Juan Manuel, Pedro de Medina, and Martín Vázquez, and generally sought to replace nobles with gentry and educated lawyers. More importantly, Charles changed the Council's functions. The Royal Council would no longer deal with the vast majority of civil law disputes and cases, allowing them to focus on administration instead. Judicial complaints and appeals would now be dealt with by a new and expanded judiciary, the audiencias. With the reputation of the Council restored, the quality of its appointees rose.

During this period, the Royal Council became known as the Council of Castile, to reflect that the Council's power extended only over Castile and not the whole empire. With the growth of Spain's overseas conquests, and the prodding of Charles' grand-counselor and close friend Mercurino di Gattinara, the Council of Castile expanded and split.

Between the years 1522–1524, the Council of Castile reorganized the government of the Kingdom of Navarre, dismissing its viceroy, Antonio Manrique de Lara, 2nd Duke of Nájera. A Council of Finance (Spanish: Consejo de Hacienda) was created, and, on 1 August, the Council of the Indies (Spanish: Consejo Real y Supremo de las Indias) was split from the Council of Castile.

Thirty years later, in 1555, the Council of Italy was formed, yet another offspring of the Council of Castile. Guttinara also saw the establishment of the Consejo de la Cámara de Castilla, composed of three or four trusted members of the Council who had power to deal with unpopular or secret issues.

=== Post Charles I: Prominence and decline ===
The Royal Council came to prominence again during the minority of Charles II of Spain from 1665 to 1675–1677 in which his mother, Mariana of Austria, acted as regent. In 1697, Andrés de Medrano, 2nd Count of Torrubia, was appointed Dean of the Royal Council of Castile. After Philip V of Spain became the first Bourbon king in 1700, the Nueva Planta decrees approved between 1707 and 1716 abolished the autonomy of the former Crown of Aragon and centralised power in Madrid. The council also played a prominent role under Charles III and Charles IV of Spain, before being abolished in 1812 by the Cortes of Cádiz. Restored in 1814 by Ferdinand VII of Spain, it was finally dissolved in 1834 by Isabella II.
