= Battle of Colhuacatonco =

1521 Spanish-Aztec battle

- Part of the Siege of Tenochtitlan and the Spanish Conquest of Mexico
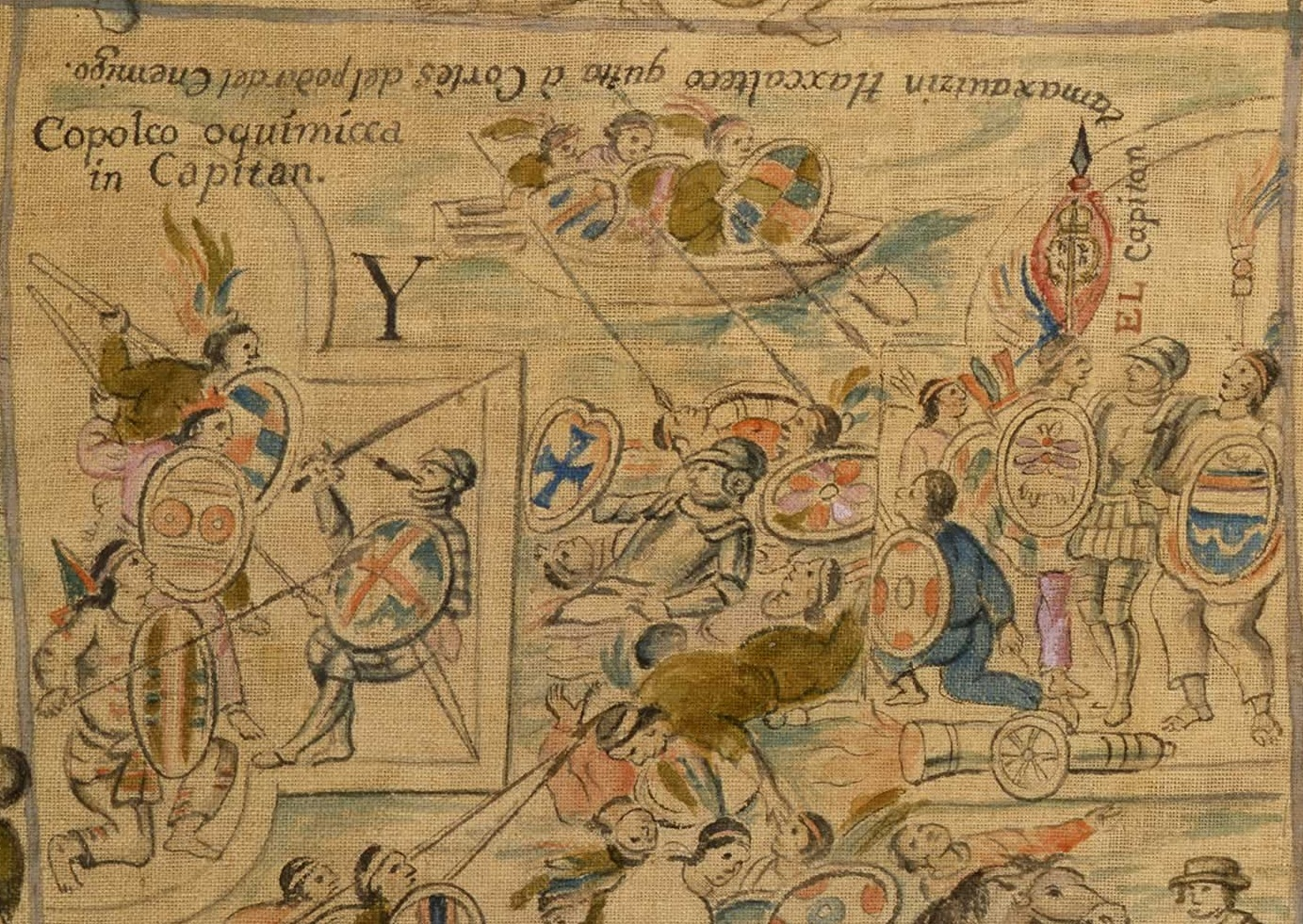
- The moment Hernán Cortés was captured by the Mexica upon being ambushed, moments before being rescued. 1773 reproduction of the Lienzo de Tlaxcala.
Date	30 June 1521
Location	Mainly in and around Colhuacatonco calpolli, Cuepopan campan, Tenochtitlan, Mexica Empire (modern-day Cuauhtémoc borough, Mexico City) 19.44339°N 99.13528°W
Result	Mexica victory

Belligerents
Mexica Empire: Tenochtitlan; Tlatelolco	Spanish Empire; Republic of Tlaxcala
	Supported by: Cholollan; Huejotzingo; Texcoco; Chalco; Tlalmanalco; Xochimilco

Commanders and leaders
Cuauhtémoc; Ecatzin Popocatzin	Hernán Cortés (WIA); Gonzalo de Sandoval (WIA); Pedro de Alvarado; Julián de Alderete; Andrés de Tapia (WIA); Jorge de Alvarado

Strength
Thousands of warriors and many war canoes.	Over 300 Spanish infantry, 15 or 16 horses, and tens of thousands of indigenous warriors. 7 brigantines and over 3,000 war canoes.

Casualties and losses
Many killed and wounded.	Spanish forces: 40 - 66 captured and later killed. Several killed in action and many wounded. 8 horses killed (probably 4 of them captured and later killed). One brigantine captured. One or two light artillery pieces lost.: Indigenous allies: c. 2,000 killed or captured to be later killed. Hundreds wounded.

The Battle of Colhuacatonco was fought on 30 June 1521 during the late stages of the Siege of Tenochtitlan between Spanish-Tlaxcalan forces and the Mexica Empire (also typically referred as Aztec Empire). It is regarded as the most important victory achieved by the Mexica during the siege.

The battle was fought as a result of the Spanish soldiers growing dissatisfied with the lack of progress done during the siege thus far, as the Spanish-Tlaxcalan forces had failed to take any important amount of territory since the beginning of June. Captain Hernán Cortés of the Spanish decided to launch a massive assault onto the city to take the market of Tlatelolco. The Spanish faced a much stronger resistance than expected and were eventually forced to retreat, suffering their worst losses since La Noche Triste and the Battle of Otumba a year earlier.

Though much of the fighting occurred elsewhere in Tlatelolco, northern Tenochtitlan and Tacuba, the battle became known as such because most of the fighting occurred in this neighborhood; the Spaniards suffered their worst losses in this battle in this site.

The battle became famous among modern historians as a result of the Spanish defeat, which was perceived as humiliating and retroactively seen as a demonstration of indigenous resistance against colonialism even in the most dire circumstances, as by this point the city was already facing widespread starvation and disease and yet still achieved victory, though the battle did not stop the city from falling to the Spanish Empire in August of the same year. The battle also became famous because Cortés narrowly escaped death during the fighting, as he was captured by multiple Mexica warriors, who typically didn't spare their prisoners, before he was rescued.

== Background ==
=== The siege of Tenochtitlan ===
Map of the Valley of Anáhuac at the time of the Spanish arrival in 1519, showing the locations of the cities in Lake Texcoco.

In late April 1521, during the late stages of the Spanish Conquest of Mexico, the troops under the command of the Spanish captain Hernán Cortés began preparations to lay under siege the city of Mexico-Tenochtitlan, de facto capital of the Mexica Empire known today as Mexico City. In the 28th, 13 brigantines were launched from Texcoco and protected by thousands of war canoes from their allies to assert their dominance over Lake Texcoco, where the city was settled (though one of them was eventually scrapped due to its vulnerable size), and in May 22 they destroyed the Chapultepec aqueduct to cut the city's water supply. Mexico and Spain had been in a state of war since May 1520, and the Spanish were aided by an alliance with Tlaxcala, a nation which had been at war with Mexico for many years, which was formed in September 1519 and brought them thousands of warriors. They were also aided by many different cities and towns in the Valley of Anáhuac which allied the Spanish and Tlaxcalans as a result of their desire for aid against the empire's domination. Among the most important of these allies was Ixtlilxóchitl II, who was the de facto ruler of Texcoco since Cacamatzin's arrest in early 1520. He supplied the Spanish about 50,000 warriors who proved vital for the war effort, though his support for the Spaniards gave him a reputation of being a traitor among the Mexica. According to Cortés, by the time the Battle of Colhuacatonco took place the Spanish had an army of 150,000 indigenous warriors protecting them.

During this period, Cuauhtémoc was emperor since early 1521, being crowned after the sudden death of his uncle Cuitláhuac due to smallpox. Despite being no older than 25 years, his hatred towards the Spaniards and ability as a warrior made him a serious rival for the Spanish and Tlaxcalans. As the population of Tenochtitlan was being evacuated to Tlatelolco at the north of the city, Cuauhtémoc stationed his headquarters in the site of Yacacolco, in the calpolli (neighborhood) of Atenantitech, near the market of Tlatelolco.

Cortés then divided his troops to settle themselves into three garrisons to cut the resources of the city: one in Tlacopan (today known as Tacuba) at the west under the command of Pedro de Alvarado, another in Coyoacán at the southwest under Cristóbal de Olid, and the third and largest one in Iztapalapa at the south under Gonzalo de Sandoval. Cortés settled himself in Acachinanco, the point where the Iztapalapa causeway forks to Tacubaya and Coyoacán at the west and Iztapalapa, Mexicatzinco and Colhuacan at the south. By the early days of June, these positions had been successfully captured after the Spanish won various battles for control of the lake, the western parts of the valley and Iztapalapa. Sandoval was eventually relocated to Coyoacán, where he fought and defeated the local defenders, as Cortés joined forces with Olid, prepared his camp and set up a large iron cannon, one of the three the Spanish had available, for an assault. Everyday during this period various skirmishes were fought, both during the day and the night, as the Mexica raided the Spanish camps and the brigantines caused chaos and destruction across the city. Sandoval meanwhile, under the advice of Alvarado, decided to capture the northern causeway at Tepeyac and settled himself there, cutting off the last opening the city had, completing the blockade.

=== First assaults into the city ===
The first major assault onto the city was carried out six days after Cortés settled in Acachinanco, going through the calpolli of Xoloco, in the campan (one of Tenochtitlan's four divisions) of Moyotlan at the south of the city. Using the heavy cannon and two brigantines, they managed to penetrate their way into the central plaza of the city, where they famously stormed the Templo Mayor, killing the priests on top. However, the Spanish were suddenly met with multiple war canoes from between the buildings and were forced to flee in a rush, abandoning the cannon, which the Mexica later pushed into the lake, as they retreated back to Acachinanco. Even then however, the Spanish cavalry proved very effective and killed many Mexica warriors and forced many others to retreat, which allowed the Spanish to get out more easily.

Though in this assault the Spaniards were eventually forced back, the fact that they broke their way into the heart of the city's capital despite the fierce resistance inside caught the attention of many peoples across the valley, and soon enough Cortés obtained more allies, such as the Chinampaneca (peoples from the south of the lake, including the Xochimilca, Mexicatzinca, Cuitlahuaca, etc.) and several Otomi tribesmen, who were highly skilled warriors.

Throughout the following assaults, the main tactic the Spanish used was to penetrate into the city, burn and destroy buildings and houses and filling gaps in the causeways to create more space for future assaults and attempt to destroy any monuments in the city that were possible to demoralize their enemy, and at the night they would return to their camps to safety. They soon destroyed their old barracks at the Palace of Axayácatl and the prestigious Totocalli zoo built during the reign of Moctezuma II. However, everytime the Spaniards engaged in another assault they found that most of their progress had been undone; the Mexica were rebuilding whatever they could and creating new gaps in the causeways after each assault. The speed at which the Mexica undid the Spanish progress baffled Cortés, and it started to become clear that a new plan was needed to succeed. Cortés initially did not want to settle himself in the city itself, as that would've left the camps relatively unprotected and would've left him completely surrounded, but Alvarado and Sandoval became increasingly impatient with Cortés' tactic and eventually began to capture territory and create camps in the city itself.

One day however, in the middle of June, Alvarado, without consulting Cortés or receiving any aid from the other Spanish groups or indigenous allies, decided to perform a major assault to the market of Tlatelolco, an objective which was perceived as vital to achieve victory. The two or three Spanish brigantines under Alvarado landed in the site of Iyauhtenco, in the calpolli of Nonoalco, in western Tlatelolco, without indigenous allies. Noting their numerical advantage, the Mexica hid most of their troops within the buildings to perform an ambush. The intensity of the ambush forced the Spaniards to retreat back to their brigantines. Some Spaniards were captured and were then sacrificed. Though some records suggest that only four Spaniards were captured in this assault, indigenous records suggest the number to be as high as fifteen. Bernal Díaz del Castillo, a Spanish soldier who wrote a detailed chronicle on the war, suggested that five Spaniards were captured and two others were killed in the brigantines.

Cortés was upset at Alvarado for this reckless action, to the point that he personally sailed to Alvarado's camp to reprimand him, but noting how far he managed to get into Tlatelolco before being forced to retreat, some Spanish noticed that a large assault into Tlatelolco could result in a victory, as progress thus far had been very slow.

=== Tactics and strategies used in the siege ===
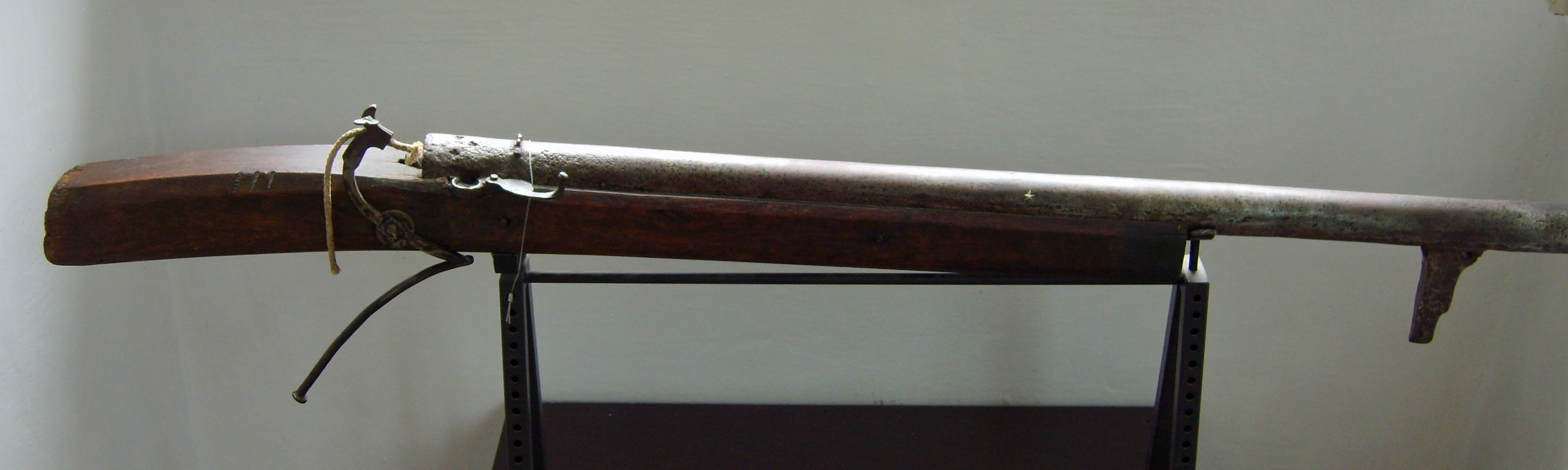
Serpentine lock arquebus from the early 16th century.

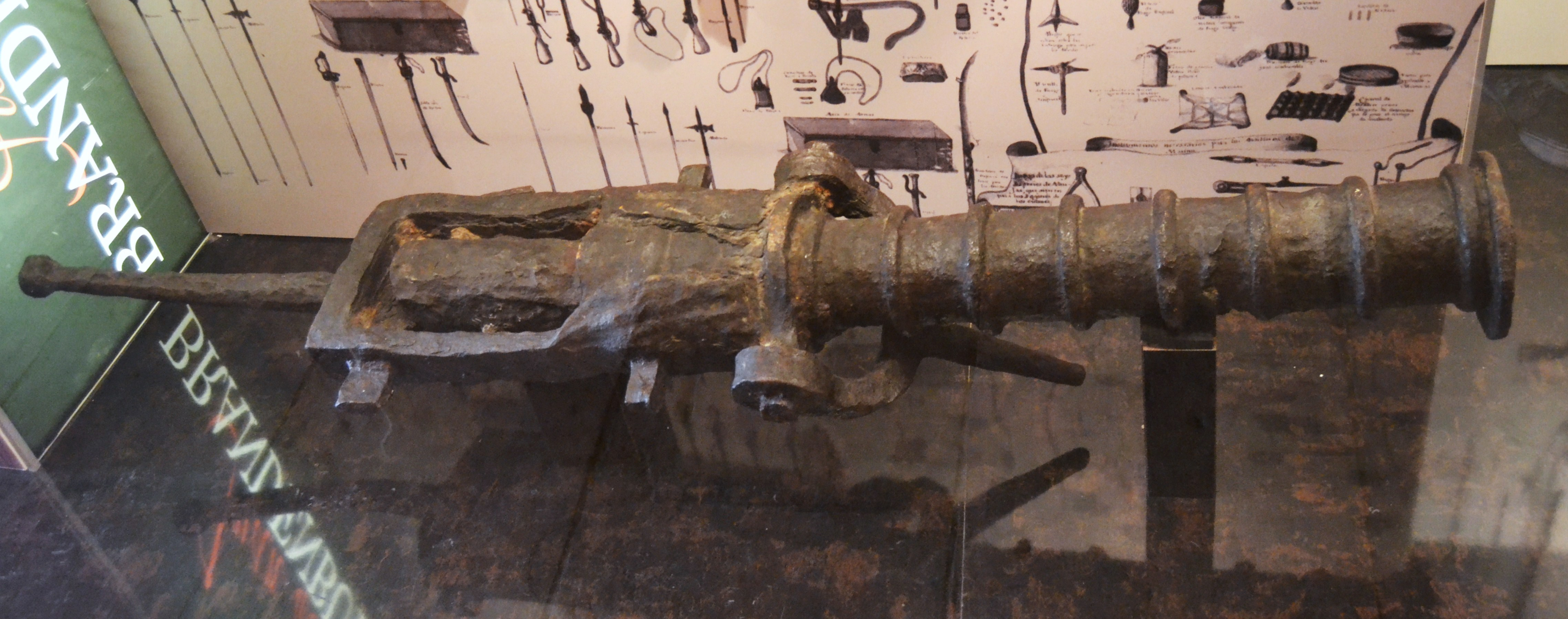
Spanish breech-loading falconet from the late 15th or early 16th century.

Examples of types of weapons brought by the Spanish which the Mexica were largely unfamiliar with.

At its peak in June 1520, the Spanish army numbered over 1300 soldiers, 80 crossbowmen, 80 arquebusiers and 96 horses, but by the time the Spanish set their brigantines afloat the army had been reduced to 700 footmen, 86 horses and 118 crossbowmen and arquebusiers, along with 3 large cannons and 15 smaller ones. The numerical superiority of the Mexica was highly important, and thus the thousands of indigenous warriors who allied the Spanish played a crucial role in the war. Tenochtitlan, however, was not prepared for a siege like this; its enormous population largely relied on resources brought from other parts of the empire and it did not possess enough food storage to feed the entire population during sieges. Cortés's strategy was largely based on starving the city rather than conquering it through combat alone. Another advantage the Spanish had was their technological superiority; the Spanish brought weapons with them which completely challenged the traditional ways of Mexica combat. Their cannons, firearms and crossbows could easily disrupt Mexica formations on the narrow causeways with their superior power, thus challenging the Mexica troops in what would normally be an advantageous position with their numerical superiority.

To make matters worse for the Mexica, there had been a smallpox epidemic in the region since May 1520, since a few of the men under Captain Pánfilo de Narváez had the disease and, when Cortés convinced his men to join him after the Battle of Cempoala, they unintentionally carried it to Tenochtitlan. The indigenous population did not have immunity against this disease and millions died of it throughout the following years.

Examples of early 16th-century European weapons: a cannon, arquebuses and halberds.

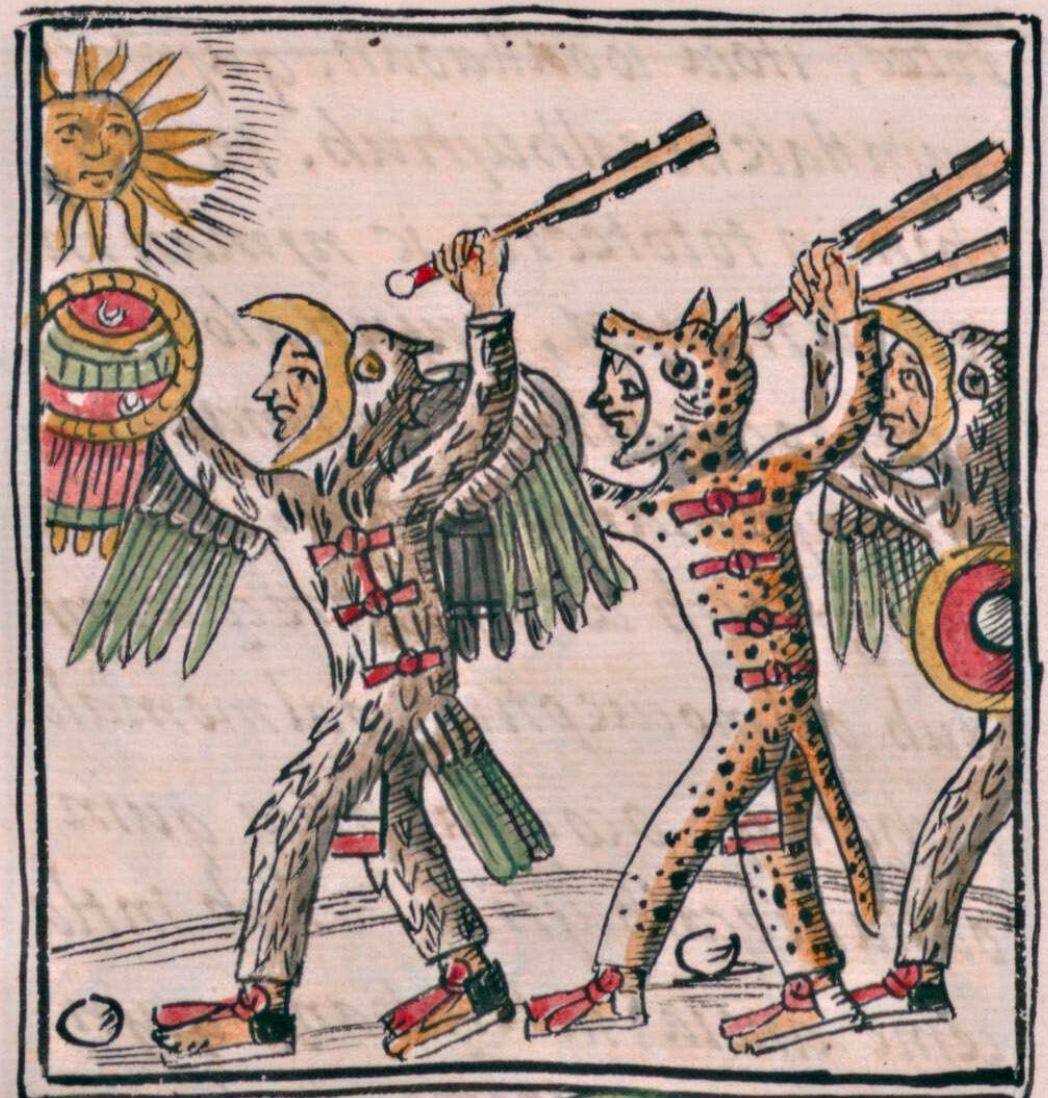
Mexica eagle and jaguar warriors, each using a macuahuitl.

As the siege began, however, the Mexica adapted to their enemy's tactics and developed their own, as they could hardly use their traditional tactics and customs against their technologically superior foe with thousands of allies. As the Mexica faced difficulties fighting on the causeways due to the Spanish technological superiority and could not attack through the rear due to their native allies, they abandoned old war customs such as attacking usually during the day and started to carry out nighttime raids on the Spanish camps. They also developed maneuvers to avoid the cannons by moving from side to side instead of fighting in straight lines, and began to duck when a shot was fired; they built barricades to protect themselves from the arquebuses and crossbows, though they were vulnerable to the cannons; they eventually started to place traps in the lake by installing sharp stakes on the lake floor to trap the brigantines and by creating gaps in the causeways that couldn't be seen from above, to make their enemies fall into the water. The most common battle tactic used by the Mexica throughout the siege were feigned retreats, cleverly used in effective manners against the Spaniards. Through these new tactics, the Mexica successfully slowed down the Spanish advance, as every time the Spanish captured any territory the Mexica would recapture it in the night and install even more traps. In one highly successful nighttime attack using these tactics, the Mexica captured one brigantine and killed both its captain and the captain of another brigantine. Still, however, the Spanish had the naval advantage, as was proven when the Mexica tried to launch a similar attack on the brigantines some time after, but were defeated when the Spanish, likewise, lured them into a trap through a feigned retreat.

== Battle ==
=== Planning and preparations ===
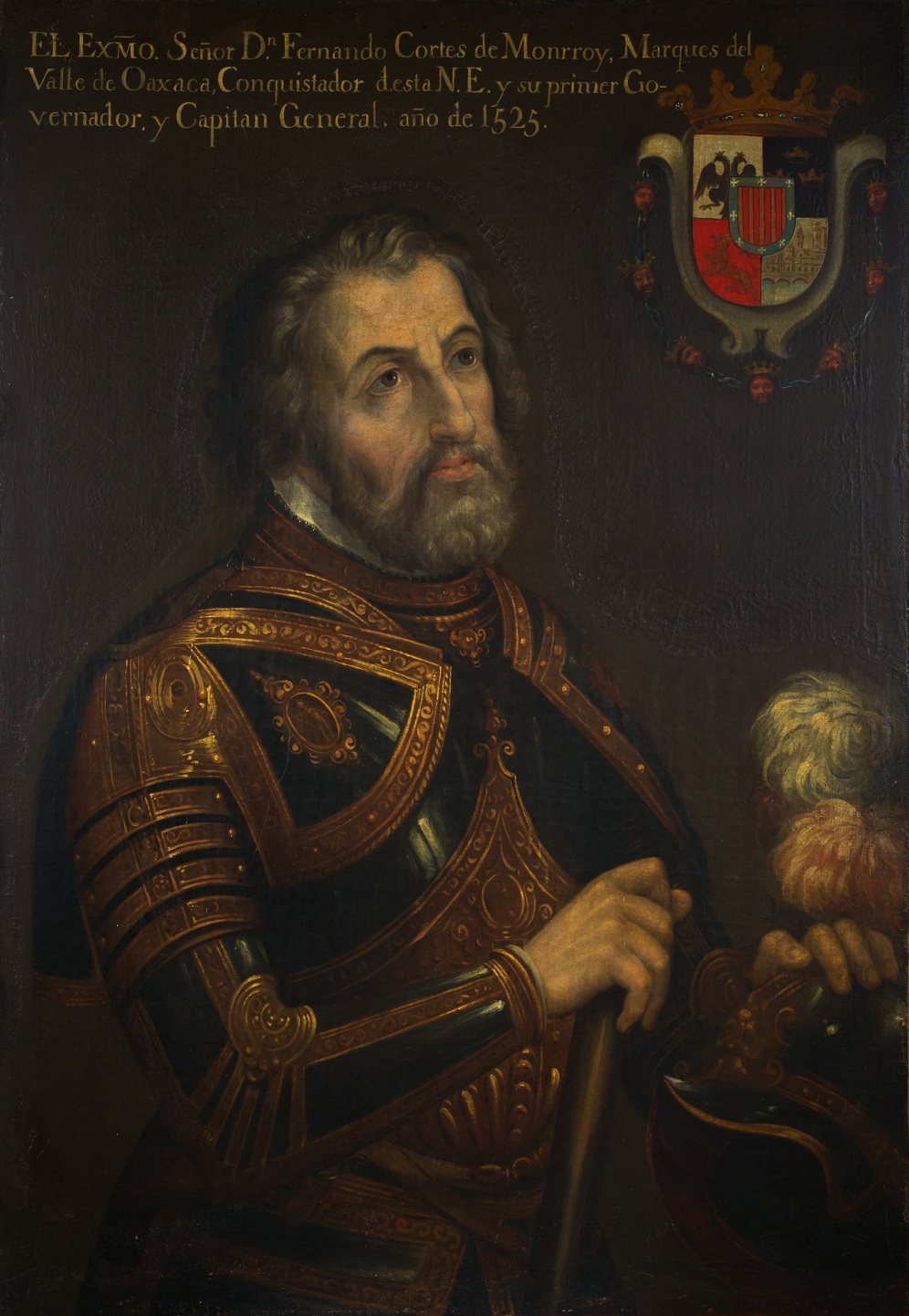
Colonial copy of a 1525 portrait of Hernán Cortés.

Upon noting the lack of progress done thus far and the recent counter-offensives launched by the Mexica, the Spanish became impatient and many believed that a large assault into the city was needed to achieve victory. For the last few days the Spanish camps had faced significant simultaneous attacks launched by Cuauhtémoc that killed some Spaniards, with 10 killed in Alvarado's camp alone, where the most fighting occurred. Such losses which would be insignificant in European warfare, but were considerable in the current context. Cortés received conflicting advice on what actions to take however, as some believed that such a large push would leave the current captured territories unprotected and thus vulnerable to a counter-offensive. Cortés finally decided that indeed a large assault would be beneficial if successful, and prepared an assault to the market of Tlatelolco. The planning of the assault was done together with the royal treasurer Julián de Alderete, who was among those who persuaded Cortés into preparing the assault.

The day before the battle, Cortés sent messages to Alvarado and Sandoval in the north to prepare for the battle, ordering Sandoval to join Alvarado with a large portion of his camp's forces to attack through the road in Nonoalco that led to the market, where Alvarado was recently defeated. They would work as the support force. He also ordered for a portion of their troops to be supplied to his camp so that the main force at the south could be more effective.

The Tlatelolco troops appeared to have been already expecting such an assault to take place, suspicions that started as a result of recent minor assaults in the northeast, in the calpoltin of Atenantitlan and Telpochcaltitlan, by the Spanish brigantines. Since the main Spanish force would enter through the calpolli of Atezcapan, a high ranking noble from there, tlappanecatl Ecatzin Popocatzin, warrior of Otomi rank and the tlacateccatl (roughly equivalent to general) of the calpolli, would be in command of the main defence forces. They would use the tactic based on luring the Spanish into a location through a feigned retreat and then ambush them, a tactic that had proved to be effective in previous battles.

=== The battle ===
==== Initial assault ====
The assault was performed in the morning of Sunday June 30, after the usual ceremony of Mass. The Spanish launched their attack from two fronts. The main force under the command of Cortés would attack from the south from the Templo Mayor, attacking multiple objectives, while an auxiliary force under Alvarado and Gonzalo de Sandoval would attack from the north using seven brigantines for the Spaniards and over 3000 war canoes for the Tlaxcalans and other indigenous allies.

Cortés divided his troops into three groups to attack through the three main roads that lead to the market within the campan of Cuepopan, in what is now Cuauhtémoc borough: one controlled by Alderete, with 70 Spaniards, 7 or 8 horses at the rear and between 15,000 and 20,000 natives; another controlled by Andrés de Tapia and Pedro de Alvarado's brother Jorge, with 80 Spaniards, 10,000 natives and 8 horses, aside from 10 artillery pieces which would remain at their road's entrance; and the third and largest one commanded by Cortés himself, his group possessing 100 Spanish infantry, 25 crossbowmen and arquebusiers, 8 horses and an "infinite number" of indigenous warriors from his allies. Alderete would attack through the main road that led to the market, in what is now República de Brasil street at the east; Tapia and Jorge de Alvarado would attack through a more narrow road, probably in modern-day Eje Central avenue in western Tezcatzonco calpolli at the west, and Cortés between them through the narrowest, in modern-day República de Chile street in eastern Colhuacatonco calpolli.

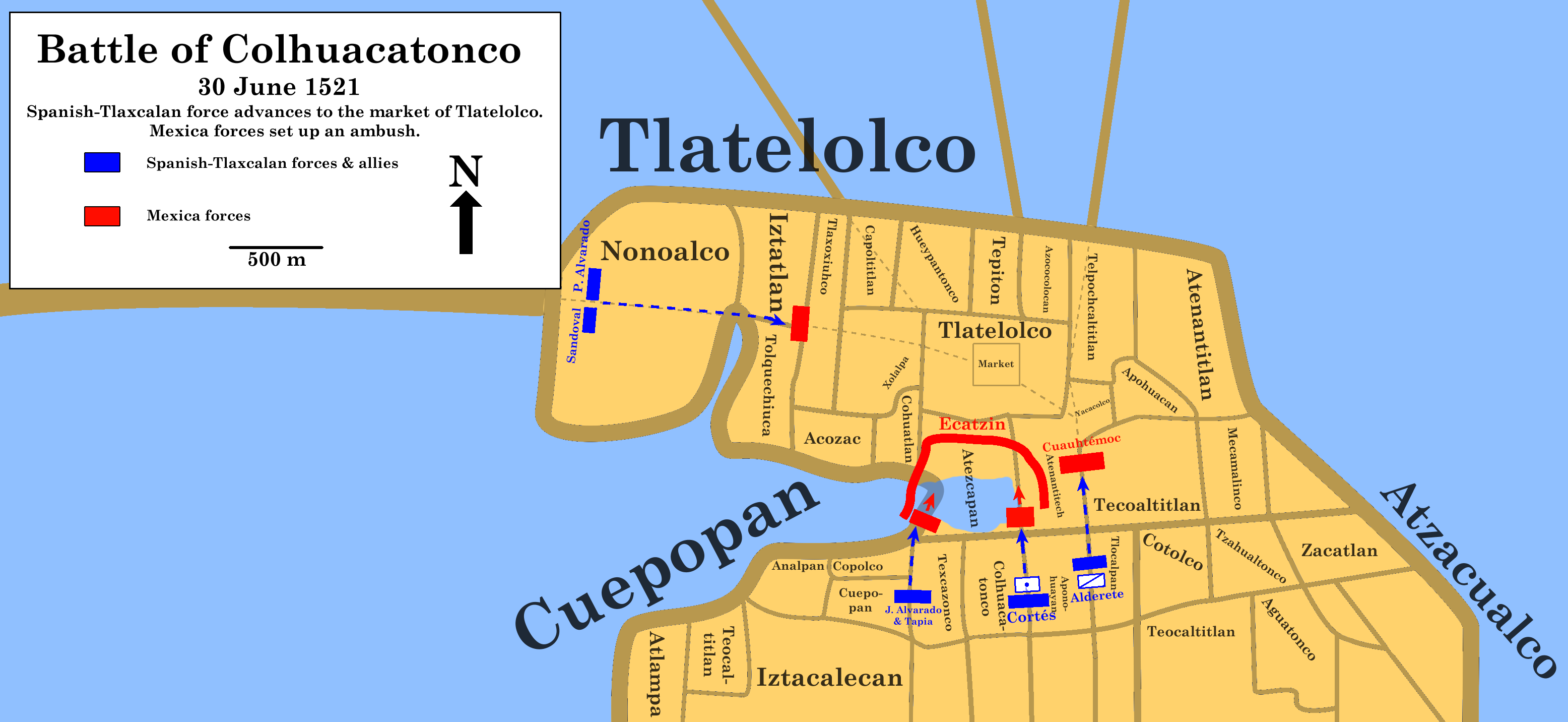
The initial assault: Spanish-Tlaxcalan forces advance to the market of Tlatelolco as the Mexica prepare an ambush.

Despite their preparations, the main force and auxiliaries were largely unaware of what was happening to each other due to their distances. For instance, Pedro de Alvarado's group was over half a league away from Cortés. This lack of communication would prove highly important for the course of the battle, as Cortés would try to give orders to his captains yet they allegedly would not receive them.

Cortés, to facilitate his entrance through the narrow road, got off his horse at the entrance and told the cavalry to no longer follow the rest of the group unless ordered otherwise. His group then advanced rapidly using a light cannon, arquebusiers, crossbowmen and their thousands of native warriors who fought the Mexica fiercely. The rapid advance made the Spaniards quite confident of their progress. Initially they were successfully pushing the Mexica away. Though resistance was considerably large, they had been successful thus far in their objective. The group eventually entered a street named Cuauecatitlan (probably modern-day Comonfort street) in Atezcapan calpolli, entering Tlatelolco. This street was highly narrow as a result of the gaps opened in the causeway. With some difficulty, using wood and adobe, they made some space to enter with more ease. After pushing the Mexica troops out, they entered the site of Tliloacan in the calpolli. At this point, Ecatzin ordered for the majority of his troops to enter the buildings to protect themselves against the Spanish artillery and prepare to perform an ambush.

==== Mexica counter-attack and Spanish retreat ====
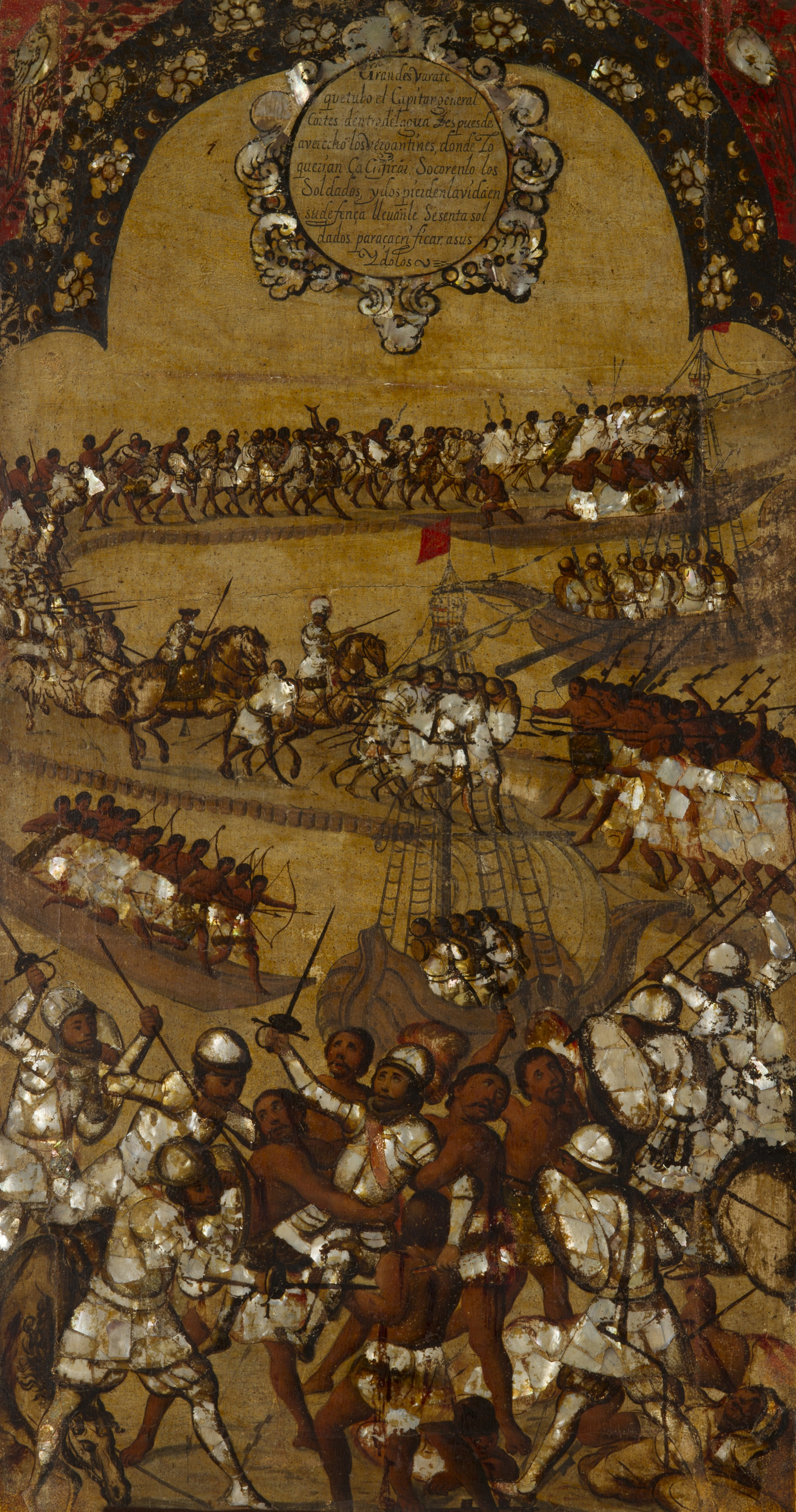
The Mexica counter-attack and soldiers rescuing Hernán Cortés upon being captured. New-Spanish painting by Miguel González, c. 1696/1715.

As the Spanish-Tlaxcalan forces were beginning to approach the market, it appears Cortés became overconfident of his progress or grew suspicious of his oddly quick advance, and thus began to halt the push. According to Cortés' own account, he stopped to make sure all gaps in the causeways were filled and was then called by one of the other two divisions to come to them and check their progress, which he did. Hundreds of Mexica warriors within the buildings suddenly saw their chance to attack the Spaniards. Not wasting his chance, Ecatzin Popocatzin gave the call for his troops to strike the Spaniards and Tlaxcalans all at once. Hundreds of warriors and many war canoes through the canals entered the site to attack their enemies, the ground filled with mud from the water pouring into it through the gaps in the causeway that were yet unfilled. The Spaniards, not prepared for such a counter-attack, were taken by surprise and were unable to hold their ground. The brigantines were unable to aid Cortés, as the stakes placed in the water by the Mexica made them unable to approach the battle scene in an efficient manner.

Cortés at first tried to encourage his soldiers to fight back, but when he noticed the gravity of the situation he understood that the battle was at a loss. At some point, in the nearby calpolli of Copolco at the west according to the Lienzo de Tlaxcala, Cortés was injured in the leg and captured by seven Mexica warriors. It is said that one old woman even tried to drown him. He only survived thanks to two Spaniards and one Tlaxcalan officer named Antonio Temaxahuitzin, with the help of his men, who killed four of his captors. One of his rescuers, named Cristóbal de Olea, was killed in the struggle. (Note: Though most sources agree with this version of the story, a few other accounts are less clear or contradict it. For example, Fernando de Alva Cortés Ixtlilxóchitl, a direct descendant of Ixtlilxóchitl II, claimed that it was Ixtlilxóchitl II himself who saved Cortés just as his captors were about to cut his head off, and also claimed that the story of Olea's sacrifice was probably fabricated by one of his descendants, which contradicts most sources on the matter. On the other hand, the indigenous account recorded by Diego Durán simply described Cortés' rescuer as a "Biscayan page" who was brutally killed. Fray Juan de Torquemada claimed that all three of them; Olea, Ixtlilxóchitl and Antonio; had saved Cortés.) He was then given a horse and told to ride off to safety. The Mexica gave chase to the retreating Spaniards and Tlaxcalans, capturing dozens of Spaniards. Ten of them were sacrificed immediately after, while the rest were kept as prisoners to be sacrificed later. By the time the chase reached Colhuacatonco, over 50 Spaniards had been taken prisoner and famously a Spanish flag was also captured, supposedly by Ecatzin himself after he captured and cut off the arms of the flag bearer, adding to the humiliation of the Spaniards. This flag was either torn to pieces along with three other flags in front of the Spaniards to taunt them or shown in a tzompantli (wall of skulls) displaying Spanish heads. The cannon they had was also lost during the retreat and many Spanish swords, crossbows and arquebuses were captured and even used against them. Cortés claimed in his third letter to the king of Spain Carlos I that during the combat, seeing so many of his men being killed and dragged away, he became convinced for a brief moment that the war was lost and decided to stay in the battle to die along with his soldiers, and that he had to be literally dragged by an officer named Antonio de Quiñones and a few soldiers to his horse to ride to safety.

Alvarado's group was unaware of Cortes' defeat at this point and was continuing its advance. However, at some point they were also ambushed. They initially tried to hold their ground, while the Mexica used intimidation tactics to demoralize them, such as throwing the severed heads of sacrificed Spaniards into the battlefield and claiming them to belong to Cortés and Sandoval. His group, according to historian Francisco López de Gómara, had 4 Spaniards killed. Likewise, Alderete was also continuing his advance when his division was attacked in a similar manner. At that point, they began to gradually retreat while still fighting the Mexica.

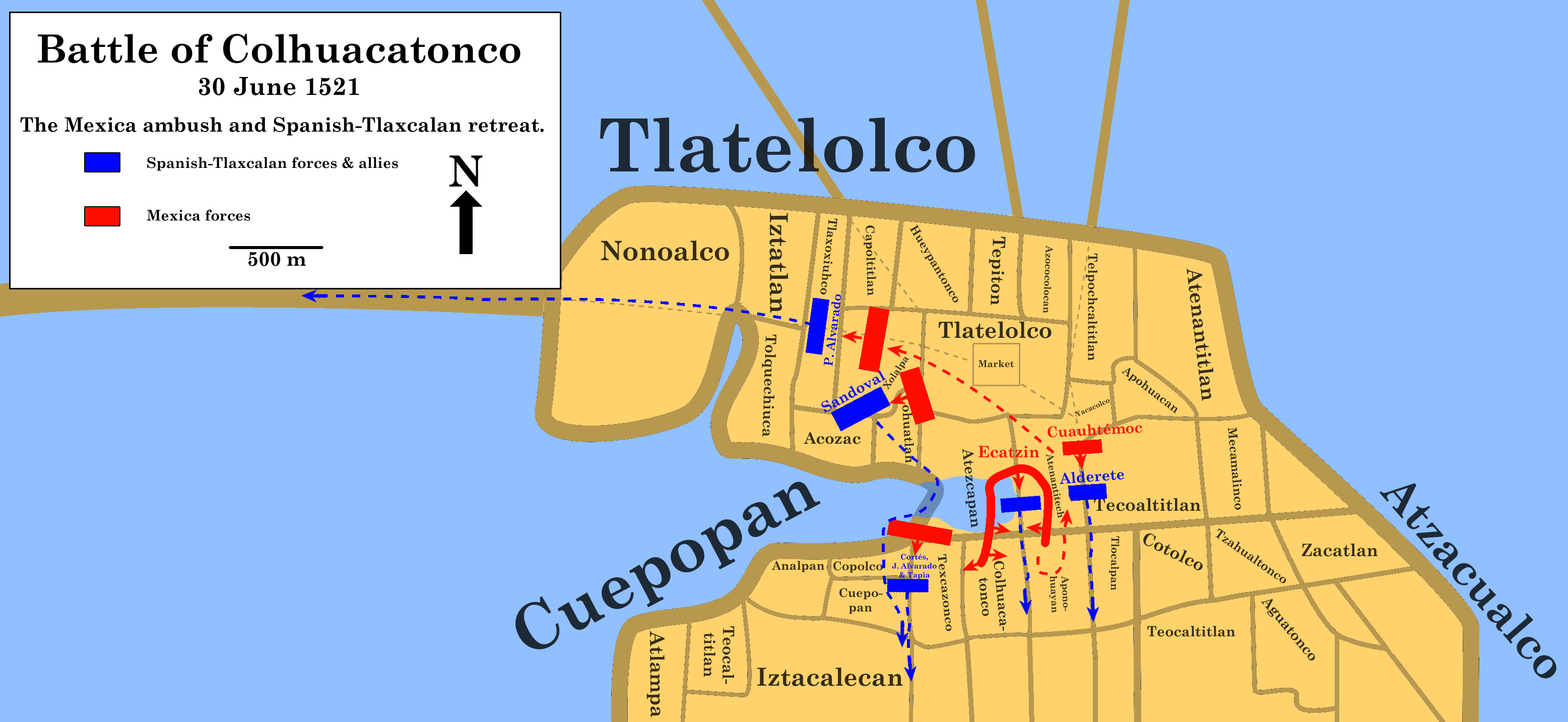
The Mexica ambush the Spaniards and Tlaxcalans. They're forced to retreat.

Upon noting his advantage, Cuauhtémoc sounded a large horn that could be heard from very large distances, which was used as an indication that none of his troops were allowed to turn back from that point forward, essentially ordering his soldiers to achieve either victory or death. At that moment the Mexica launched themselves with great fury at the Spanish-Tlaxcalan force. Díaz wrote: "How could I describe the anger and strength they charged with to fight us, it was a horrifying sight! Though I don't know how to describe it here, I still remember it as if I was seeing and fighting the battle right at this moment." All of this happened in a matter of a few hours. By midday, most of the assault force had already run away from the city.

==== Last stand of the Spaniards ====
As the Mexica were giving chase to Alvarado's troops, a pair of heavy cannons installed near their camp at Tlacopan helped them retreat back to safety, causing heavy casualties among the Mexica. Still, they did not know of Cortés' or Sandoval's state, and the threats shouted by the Mexica made them severely anxious. The brigantines however were still facing a large struggle while facing the Mexica war canoes; one of the brigantines became stuck among the stakes placed in the water, some Mexica warriors managed to climb aboard and it was almost fully captured. 3 soldiers were killed inside and one was captured alive. This brigantine was rescued by another commanded by captain Juan Jaramillo. Another also got stuck, commanded by captain Juan de Limpias Carvajal, but managed to break out after an intense fight with the Mexica, being the first one to break out of this trap.

When Cortés finally reached his camp, which was still under attack, he sent Andrés de Tapia under the protection of three horsemen to ride to Alvarado's camp to report on their current state. Though he was wounded in an ambush on the way by a few Mexica soldiers dispatched there by Cuauhtémoc in an attempt to cut the Spanish communication lines, Tapia reached the camp to find that most of the Spaniards from the camp were still in good condition.

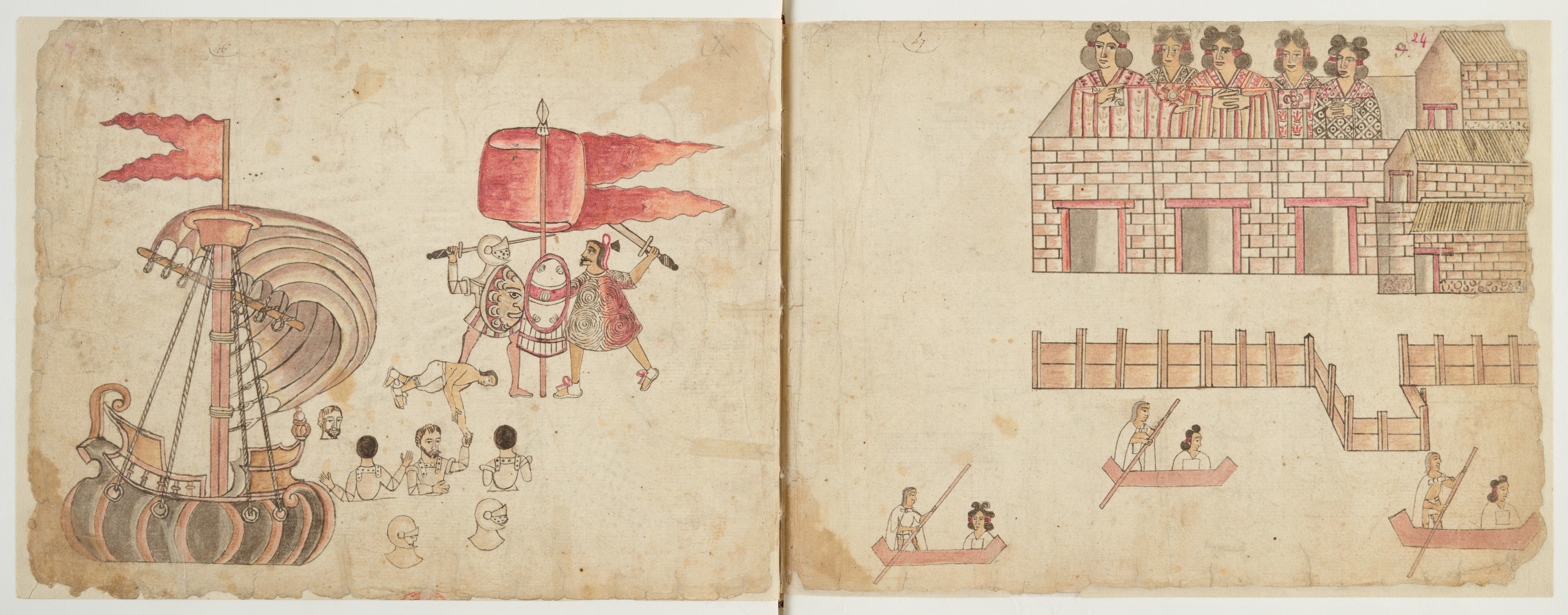
Illustrations from Codex Azcatitlan. The illustration at the left shows the battle on the shores of Lake Texcoco near Tlacopan. The Spanish soldier fighting on land has been identified as Pedro de Alvarado.

Gonzalo de Sandoval too was ambushed in the same manner as the other ambushes after Cortés had already retreated. Six of his Spanish soldiers were killed and he was badly wounded, but he still tried to encourage his soldiers to fight. Rather than returning to their camp, they began to retreat to Cortés' camp to see their commander in person under the cover of two of his brigantines through a narrow causeway, ordering his native warriors to cross the causeway first to have enough space for the Spaniards to follow more easily. Eventually they made it to his camp. Because Tapia still wasn't back since Cortés sent him to check on Alvarado's troops, he sent Sandoval and another officer named Francisco de Lugo to check on them. They finally arrived late in the afternoon.

There they found eleven soldiers, including Díaz del Castillo, fighting in the water at their waist level to rescue a brigantine that was trapped near the camp while the rest fought on land to prevent the Mexica from entering the camp. There's a probability that Ecatzin was present in this fight too, as suggested by an illustration from Codex Azcatitlan where a warrior dressed in a tunic with symbols reminiscent of the red and blue waters from a spring described in the legend of the foundation of Tenochtitlan, probably a depiction of him, is fighting a Spanish soldier identified as Pedro de Alvarado, though the illustration may be symbolic rather than a literal depiction of the events. Sandoval at first encouraged them to save the brigantine, which at this point was tied with ropes by the Mexica to try to pull it into the city. Two soldiers were killed inside of it. However, Sandoval was wounded again in the camp and soon noticed that the situation was too dire. At that moment, he told the soldiers to retreat back to their camp to save their lives. They did so fighting the Mexica in one last attempt to drive them out, but to no avail. The brigantine was captured by the Mexica and its captain, Cristóbal Flores, died of his wounds eight days after the battle. Once everyone was back in the camp, Alvarado, Sandoval and Lugo informed each other of their situation as the battle was coming to an end.

==== Killing of the prisoners ====
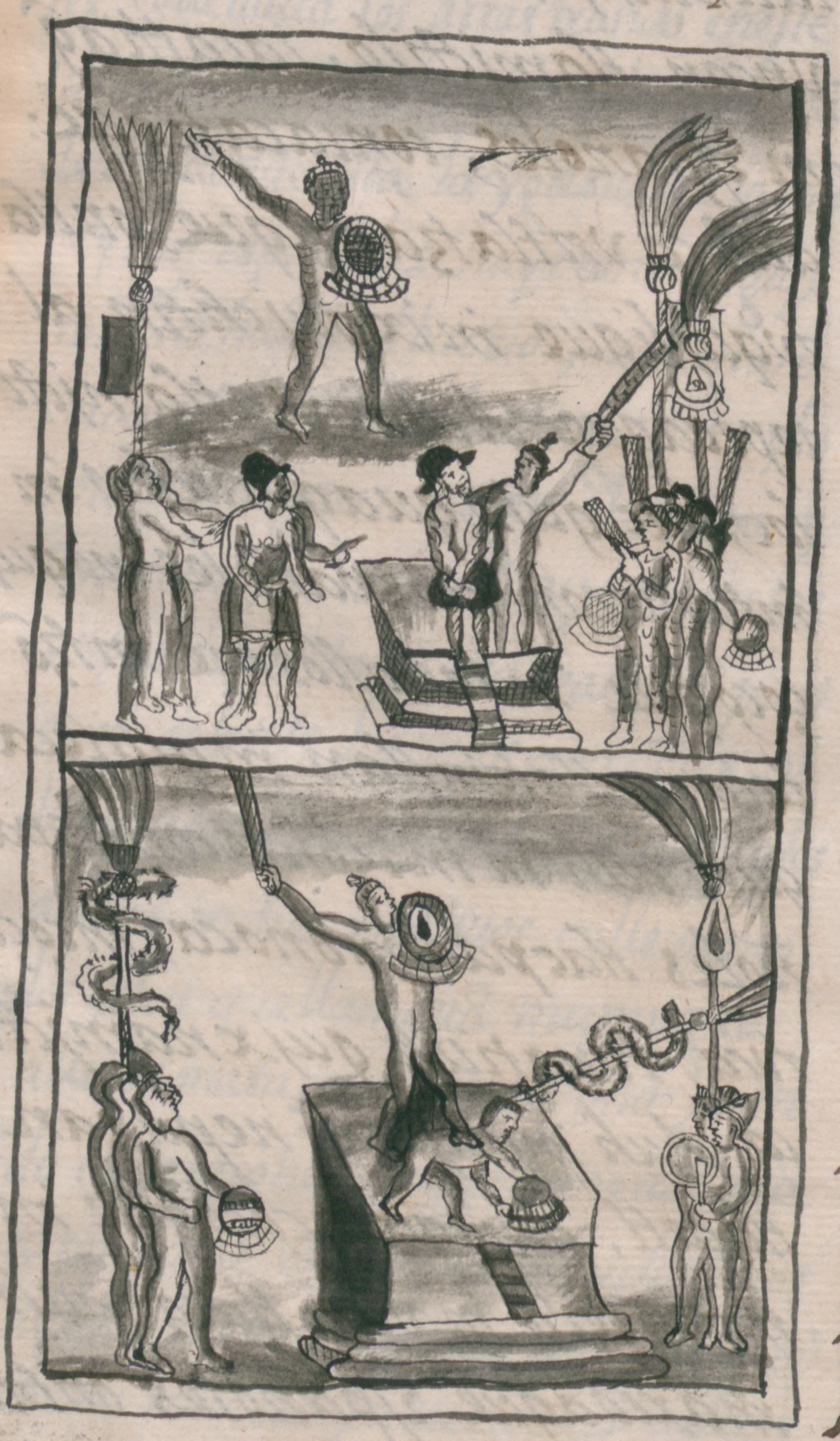
The Spanish and Tlaxcalan prisoners being sacrificed, depicted in the Florentine Codex.

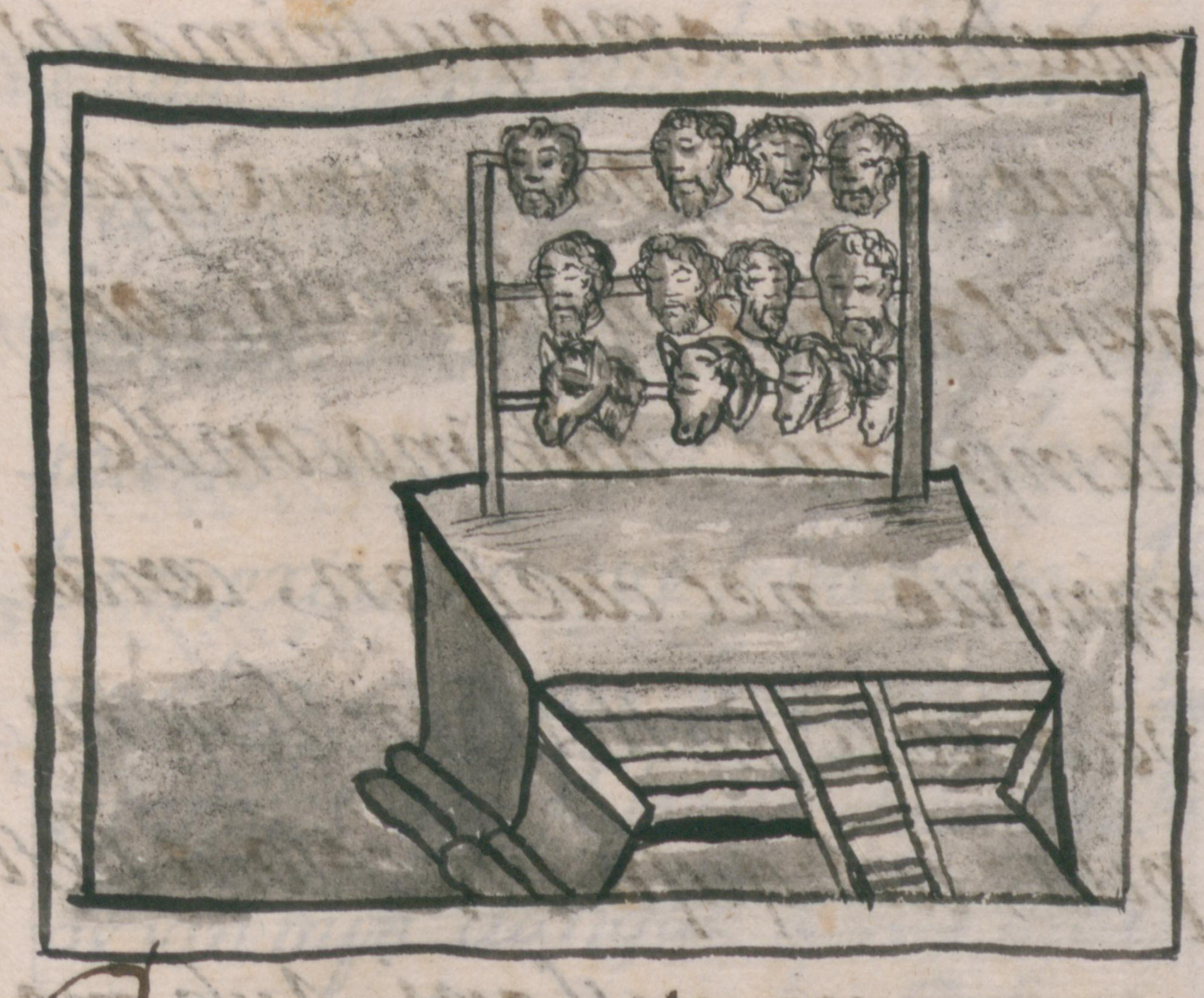
Tzompantli with the heads of the Spanish men and horses sacrificed in this battle, depicted in the Florentine Codex.

Once the fighting inside the city was drawing to a close, the Mexica began to sacrifice all remaining prisoners, who were quickly sent to Cuauhtémoc's headquarters at Yacacolco. The first ones to be sacrificed were the Spanish, then the Tlaxcalans and lastly the rest of the indigenous allies. They were sacrificed one by one. The prisoners were stripped naked, given feathered headdresses and were forced to dance for Huitzilopochtli, the Mexica god of war. Afterwards they were sacrificed by being laid on top of a sacrificial stone and having their hearts pulled out of their chests. Their bodies were then beheaded and thrown off the stairs of the temples, where they were butchered by priests at the bottom, all the while a large drum was played, displaying a "most saddening noise," along with the sound of horns and whistles. The same sacrifice was performed with the first ten victims during the battle. Díaz del Castillo describes how the Spaniards and Tlaxcalans could do nothing as they watched with horror from a distance their captured comrades be taken to the summit of the temples for this ceremony. The last of the prisoners from this battle to be sacrificed was Cortés' chamberlain Cristóbal de Guzmán, who was sacrificed eighteen days after being captured.

The Mexica then installed three tzompantin (walls made of skulls) to place the heads of the prisoners, one in Tliloacan, another in Yacacolco, and one in front of the cihuateocalli (temple of women), the ones at Tliloacan and Yacacolco having Spanish heads.

One last offensive was launched by the Mexica that day, but it was for psychological warfare. The Mexica entered the Spanish camps and attacked the Tlaxcalans and Spaniards there, but once in the camps they threw in the remains of the sacrificed prisoners, yelling insults and death threats while doing so. According to Díaz del Castillo, they threw in the arms of sacrificed Spaniards and told the Spaniards that "you will all die in this way, so was promised to us by the gods!" Then they threw the cooked legs of Tlaxcalan prisoners and yelled "eat the remaining flesh of these teules (Spaniards) and your own brothers, as we're already so full of them!" The heavy losses and the nature of these executions caused a significant psychological impact on both sides, as the Spanish and their allies were severely demoralized and the Mexica morale was boosted as the true mortality of the Spaniards was proven.

The Spanish troops in this battle suffered their worst losses since La Noche Triste and the Battle of Otumba, the battles that unfolded a year earlier as the Spanish were retreating from Tenochtitlan upon the death of emperor Moctezuma II in the early stages of the war. (Note: The exact amount of casualties suffered in each of these battles is not entirely certain, but it is known to be high. Díaz del Castillo (2011, p. 444) listed the total amount in both of these battles as over 860 Spaniards and over 1200 Tlaxcalans killed. López de Gómara (2007, p. 210) claimed that over 450 Spaniards, 4000 indigenous allies and 46 horses were killed in La Noche Triste and the days following it, but didn't describe the casualties at Otumba, and he himself stated that the exact total amount isn't clear.) According to Bernardino de Sahagún's indigenous informants, 53 Spaniards had been captured that day along with 4 horses, while Díaz del Castillo puts the estimate as high as 66 captured, several others killed in action and 8 horses killed. López de Gómara gives a lower estimate of captured soldiers, estimating that 40 were captured. Both the Annals of Tlatelolco and López de Gómara described that 2000 indigenous allies of the Spanish were also killed.

== Aftermath ==
=== Initial success of the Mexica ===
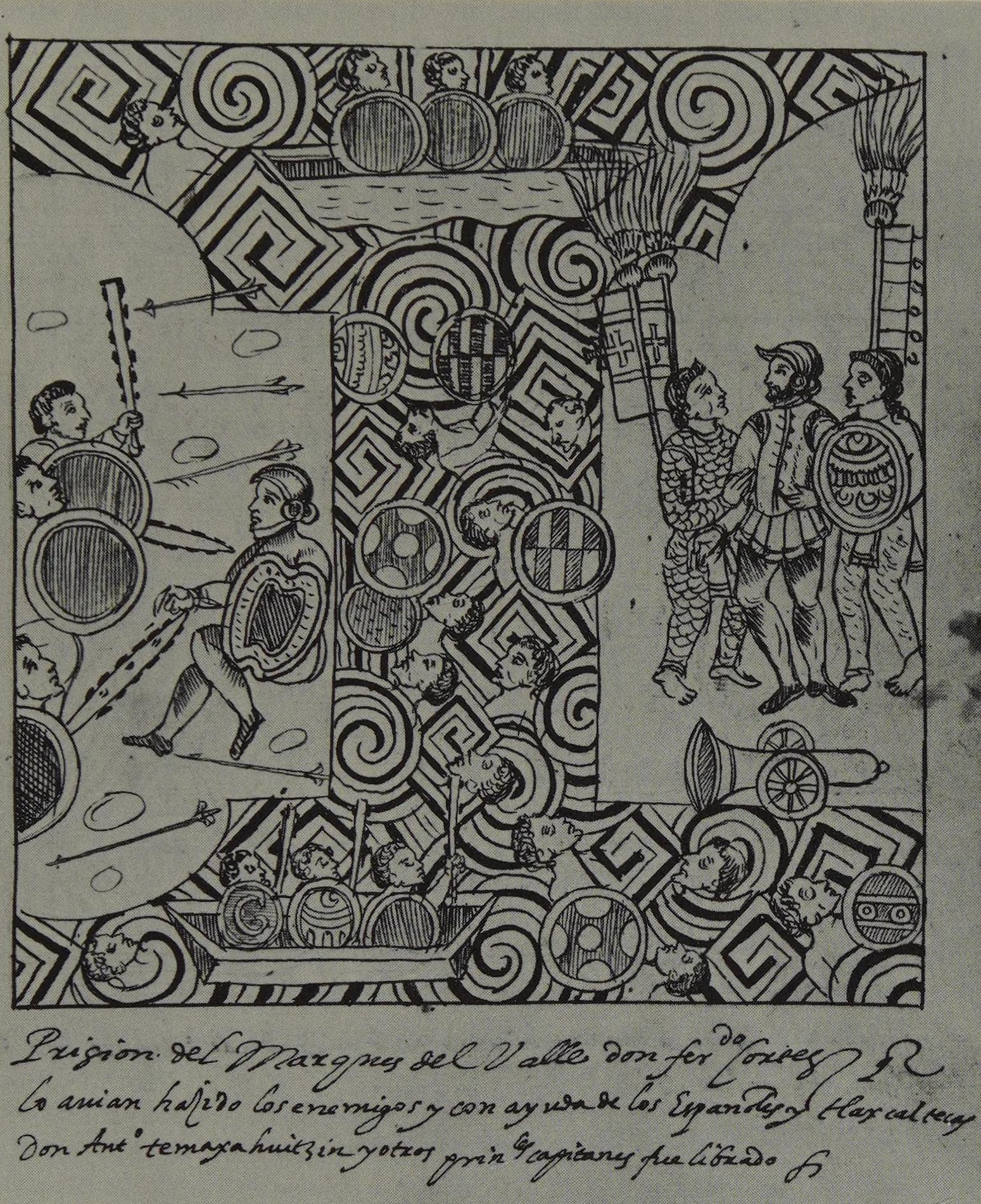
Scene from the Lienzo de Tlaxcala of Cortés' capture in the Descripción de la ciudad y provincia de Tlaxcala by Diego Muñoz Camargo.

The Spanish defeat was perceived as humiliating. The victory achieved over the Spaniards and Tlaxcalans in this battle boosted the morale of the Mexica leadership. Cuauhtémoc himself perceived the victory as decisive, believing that half of the remaining Spanish force had been annihilated, and attempted to convince the rebelled cities to join him against them, sending them various body parts of killed Spaniards as proof of his success. The Mexica celebrated for the following days, and it seems many even believed the war was over, as Cortés described how they started to open up the roads and bridges again as if the city could go back to normal. As much as the Spaniards could've attacked them then, doing so would likely have ended in an assured defeat as a result of the heavy losses suffered that day. Throughout the following four days, the Mexica launched several counter-offensives on the Spanish camps, who suffered significant losses. The Spanish did not launch any assaults throughout that period, under Cortés' orders.

The Spanish leadership, in the other hand, appeared to have failed to understand the cause of the defeat, and various captains, including Cortés himself, blamed each other for not performing well in the battle. Cortés and several others put the blame on Alderete and Pedro de Alvarado, claiming that they didn't follow his orders to make sure all gaps in the causeways were filled, instead recklessly rushing into the city and thus making the retreat a lot more difficult, while Alderete and others claimed that Cortés was at fault for allegedly not giving such orders to the other captains, contrary to Cortés' allegations, and neglecting to continue pushing forward when it was needed.

The Spanish and indigenous allies were severely demoralized by this loss. Many indigenous allies thinking the war was already lost began to defect and went home. A few important ones however, such as Ixtlilxóchitl II and the Tlaxcalan commander, referred by the title of chichimeca tecuhtli, decided to stay and encouraged Cortés to keep fighting. However, eventually the Spanish, who despite everything still dominated the lake, managed to find out how to destroy the stakes placed in the water, allowing them to sail more freely and thus getting a considerable advantage. The Spanish then went back on the offensive, but progress became very slow with less allies. As time went on however many of these allies came back as it was proven that the war wasn't lost yet.

=== Spanish recovery and fall of the empire ===
The Mexica eventually tried to launch a large counter-offensive against the allies of the Spanish which would've had a huge political impact if successful, as they could've caused their allies to abandon them if they couldn't prove they could offer efficient protection against the Mexica forces. The Mexica's allies at Malinalco tried to invade Cuauhnahuac (today known as Cuernavaca, in modern-day Morelos) and the Matlatzinca people at the west tried to march directly onto the Spanish camps. However, Cortés dispatched Tapia to defeat the Malinalcas, he succeeded in ten days, and Sandoval defeated the Matlatzincas two days later, sacking and burning down their homeland.

To Cortés' luck, just as their gunpowder was beginning to run out, in the middle of July a Spanish ship which, according to the American historian William H. Prescott, formed part of the expedition of the explorer Juan Ponce de León, who had ended his expedition in the Florida peninsula at this time, landed at Veracruz, the Spanish camp in the east coast of Mexico created in July 1519. It carried vital gunpowder, crossbows and soldiers who were quickly received by the Spanish camps in the valley, which allowed Cortés to engage in larger offensives than before.

Cortés, who did not wish to destroy the city, as he saw it as a most beautiful thing, offered Cuauhtémoc to enter into peace negotiations for the last time so that the "rebellion" could end peacefully. Cuauhtémoc at first considered it, but was advised otherwise, as the last time there was peace between Mexico and the Spanish the empire was humiliated by Moctezuma's imprisonment, the arrest of Cacamatzin, the profanation of the temples and the Alvarado Massacre. Cuauhtémoc's final answer to this embassy was a sudden offensive on Cortés' camp.

The Spanish entered the market of Tlatelolco for the first time around the first day of August, and the Spanish cavalry killed many Mexica defenders inside. Meanwhile, Ixtlilxochitl managed to capture his brother Coanacoch, who was leading loyalist Texcoca forces, defeating those among the last allies the Mexica had in the valley. The Mexica continued to defend the market, including Ecatzin himself along with many other high ranking nobles, but four days later, the Spaniards had successfully captured the market, and most of Tlatelolco was now under their control. Eventually, the city could not handle the situation anymore. Facing extreme starvation, widespread disease, having virtually no allies nearby and most of their territory being occupied by the Spaniards and Tlaxcalans, some of whom proceeded to loot, slaughter and rape thousands of civilians, (Note: Cortés (1866, p. 254) claimed in his third letter to the king of Spain that he explicitly gave orders against attacking innocents, but that because the Spanish army was so small in comparison with their native allies, as the Spanish numbered only about 900 men at this point, many of these allies did not listen to or disobeyed these orders, resulting in the massacre that took place during the last days of the siege. Díaz del Castillo (2011, p. 623) compared the situation of Tenochtitlan during these final days with the Destruction of Jerusalem, claiming that "I have read about the destruction of Jerusalem, but I'm not sure if the mortality there was any greater than here.") a last stand was launched by Cuauhtémoc on 13 August 1521, after which he and many Mexica citizens attempted to flee through the lake, but were intercepted. There Cuauhtémoc surrendered, finally ending the war and the Mexica Empire as a whole. From then on, Mexico was under Spanish control, their conquest was fulfilled.

The people of Colhuacatonco continued to "peacefully resist" being conquered however, as evidenced by archaeological discoveries from recent years which suggest that its population continued to perform pre-Hispanic rituals and activities in secret while under Spanish rule, despite its persecution by their new authorities. However, by the 17th and 18th centuries the people of the site had already assimilated into colonial Mexican culture, as is also proven by items found at the site.

== Legacy ==
In 2017, the remains of a precinct of the nobles who inhabited Colhuacatonco were found by archaeologists of the Instituto Nacional de Antropología e Historia in República del Perú street, in Cuauhtémoc borough, Mexico City. The backstory of the neighborhood was revived and gained fame as a story of a major victory being achieved by an indigenous population under extreme circumstances against their colonizers. The remains were specially notable since they suggest the idea that the population of the site continued to preserve their pre-Hispanic culture even after the war was lost.
