= Third letter of Hernán Cortés to the Emperor Charles V =

1522 letter by Hernán Cortés

The Third Letter of Relation (Tercera Carta de relación) of Hernán Cortés to the Emperor Carlos V is one of five letters written by the Spanish conquistador Hernán Cortés to the emperor Carlos V, sent with the intention of informing Carlos V of the territories discovered and their conquest; it was signed on 15 May 1522 in Coyoacán. The letter describes part of the expedition to the New World, the conquest of Tenochtitlán and the destruction of the city, covering the events from 1520 until the final conquests in 1522.

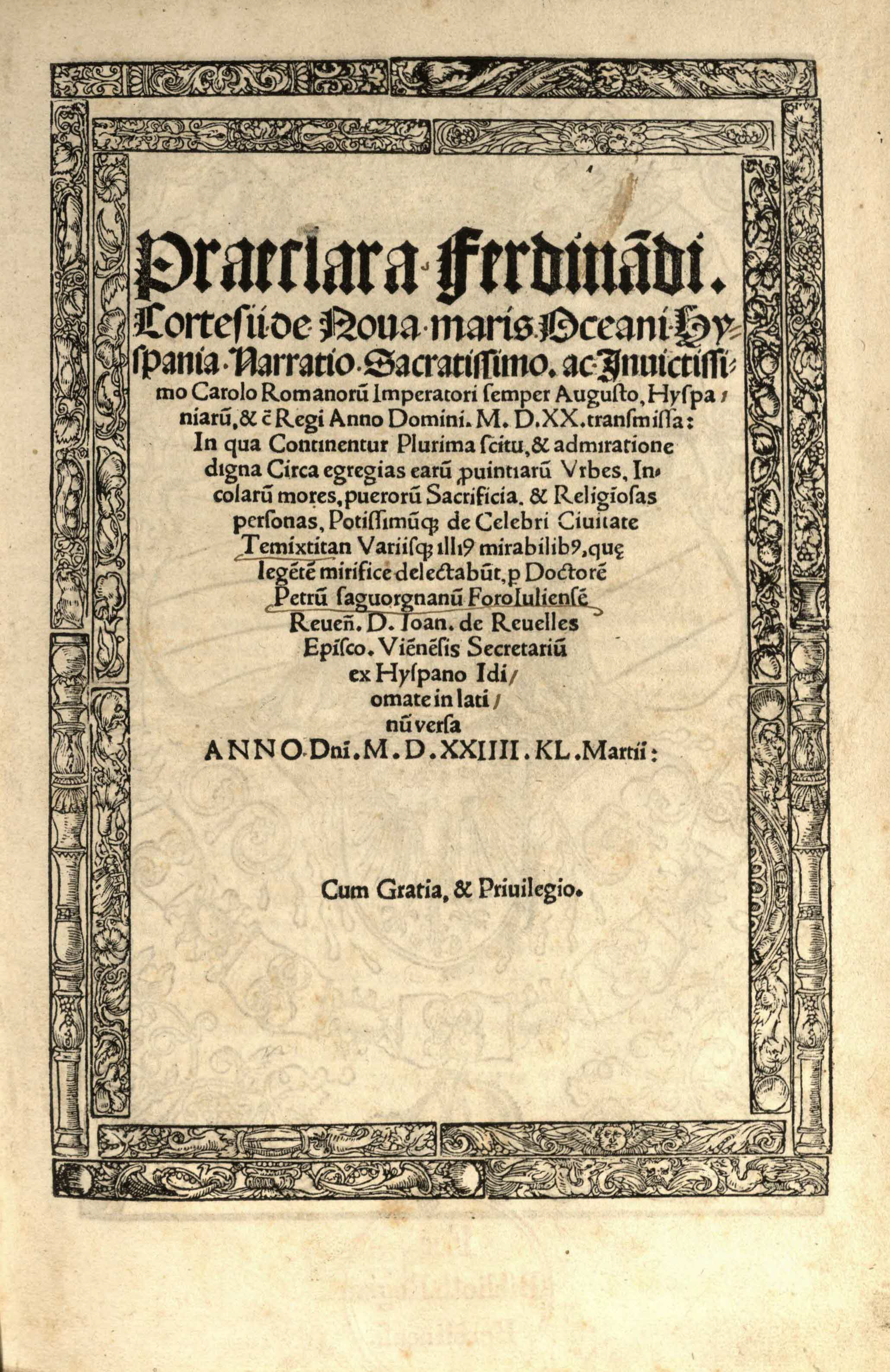
Cover of the Second and Third Cartas de Relación, Centro de Estudios de Historia de México Carso

== Contents of the letter ==
In the first part of the letter, Cortés describes the Battle of Otumba, as well as the reorganisation of the Spanish troops after the defeat of the "Night of Sorrows" at Tlaxcala, with the aim of encircling Tenochtitlán. In reference to this reorganisation, Hernán Cortés relates that it was necessary to create "Military Ordinances" to establish order among the troops and avoid thefts and pillages.

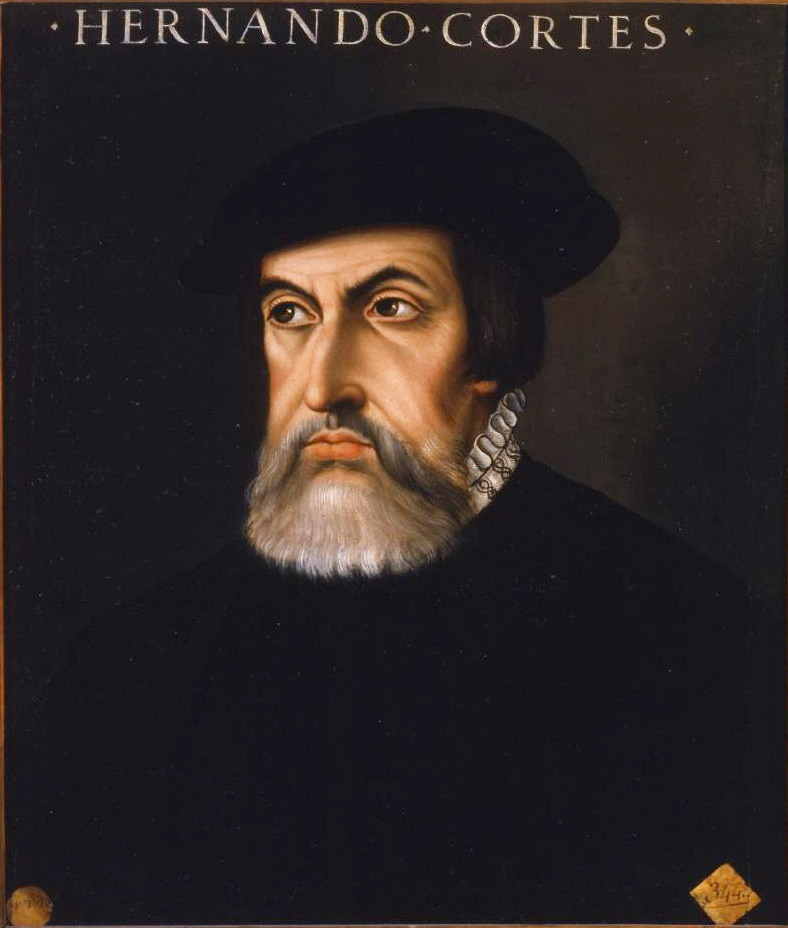
Hernán Cortés

Cortés goes on to describe the construction of the brigantines used to enter Tenochtitlán by the canals. These vessels were manufactured in Tlaxcala, as this region was the main source of support for the Spaniards within the territory. The thirteen ships were transported in parts to the lake of Texcoco with the help of the Tlaxcaltecs, building docks to assemble the brigantines, and channels to connect the docks with the lake. It was also from there that the military campaign was launched.

Cortés describes how he ordered his troops to subdue the populations surrounding Tenochtitlán and those that were vassals and suppliers of the Mexica, in order to stop essential provisions entering the city and thus bring about its early surrender. At this point in his account Hernán Cortés mentions the first of the smallpox epidemics, which killed much of the native population, and caused the death of Cuitláhuac, Moctezuma's brother, who was succeeded as emperor by Cuauhtémoc. Bernal Díaz del Castillo mentions that this epidemic originated with a black slave who had arrived with the expedition of Pánfilo de Narváez.

The conquistador also takes time to describe in detail the battles fought by the Spaniards against the Mexica, and the actions of some of his captains in the siege of the city; some of these were captured and later sacrificed, including Cristóbal de Guzmán.

The focal point of the letter is the description of the capture of Tenochtitlán and of Tlatelolco. The document states that in addition to cutting off supplies from surrounding regions, the Spaniards also cut the water supply to the city. Cortés was able to overcome a number of strategic settlements using the brigantines, occupying every street and ravaging the conquered territories, despite the resistance of the Mexica and Tlatelolcas. In the last strongholds of Tlatelolco, the troops of Cortés and those of Pedro of Alvarado were able to communicate with each other, but the latter forces nevertheless began burning down the temples.

In describing the death and destruction left after the siege, Cortés says he tried to persuade the population to surrender, but received negative replies from Cuauhtémoc and others. On completing the conquest of the territory, the captain of a brigantine, García Holguín, captured the lords of Mexico, Texcoco and Tlacopan (Cuauhtémoc, Coanacochtzin and Tetlepanquetzaltzin). The capture of Cuauhtémoc, last ruler of Mexico-Tenochtitlán, on 13 August 1521 marks the fall of the Tenochcas and the end of the Mexica empire.

== Map of the city of Tenochtitlán ==
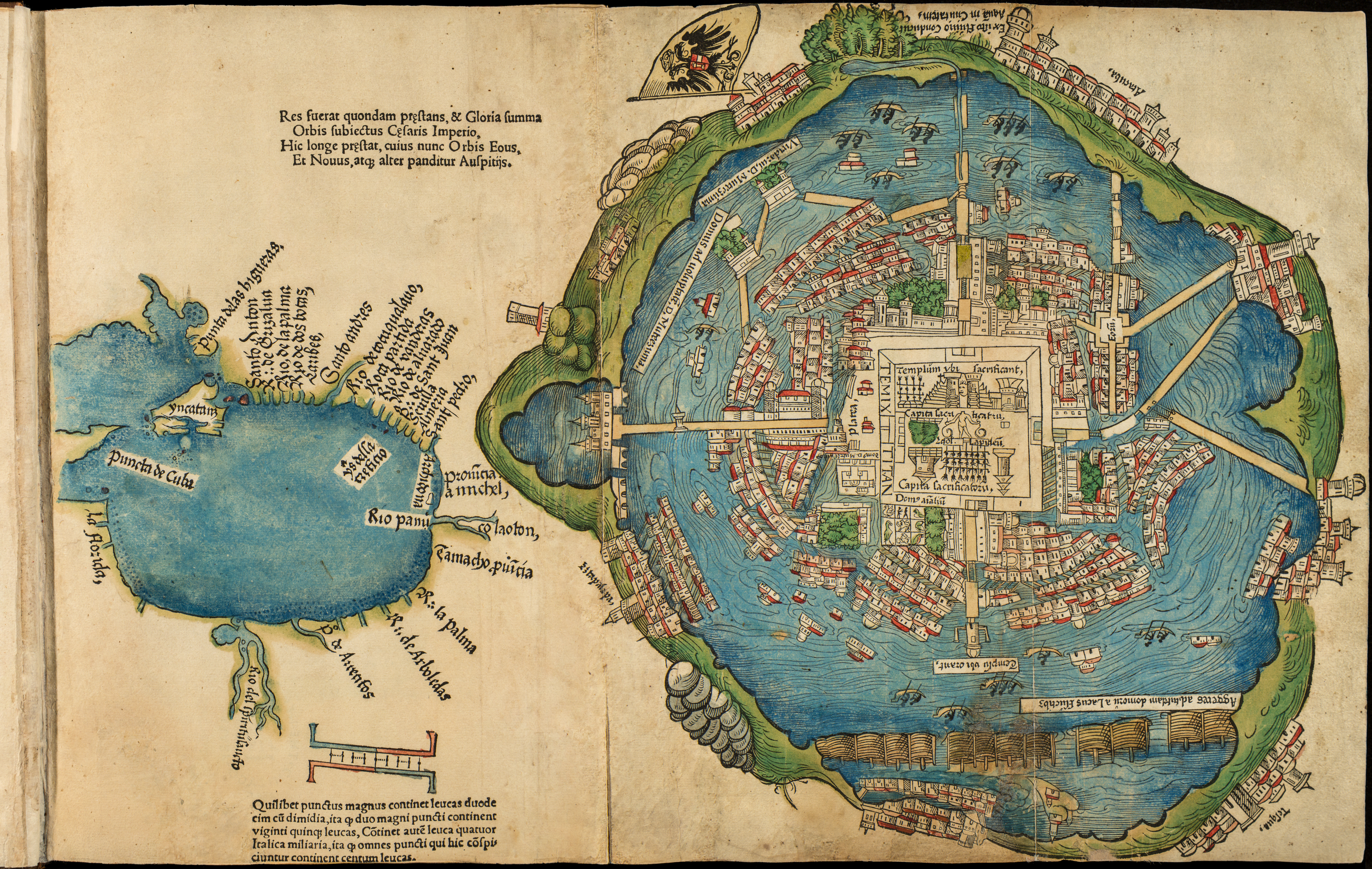
Map of Mexico Tenochtitlán

One of the elements that stands out in this letter is the attached map depicting the city of Mexico-Tenochtitlán. The map is believed to have been created in 1520, but it was enclosed only with the third letter. It was sent by the secretary of Cortés, Juan de Ribera. The map shows the lakes and avenues passing through Tenochtitlán. This map was printed in Federico Peypus Arthimesio's edition of the letters, in Nuremberg, in 1524.
