= Tower of the church of San Salvador =

Mudéjar bell tower located in Teruel, Spain

Tower of Iglesia de San Salvador
- Torre de la Iglesia de San Salvador (Spanish)
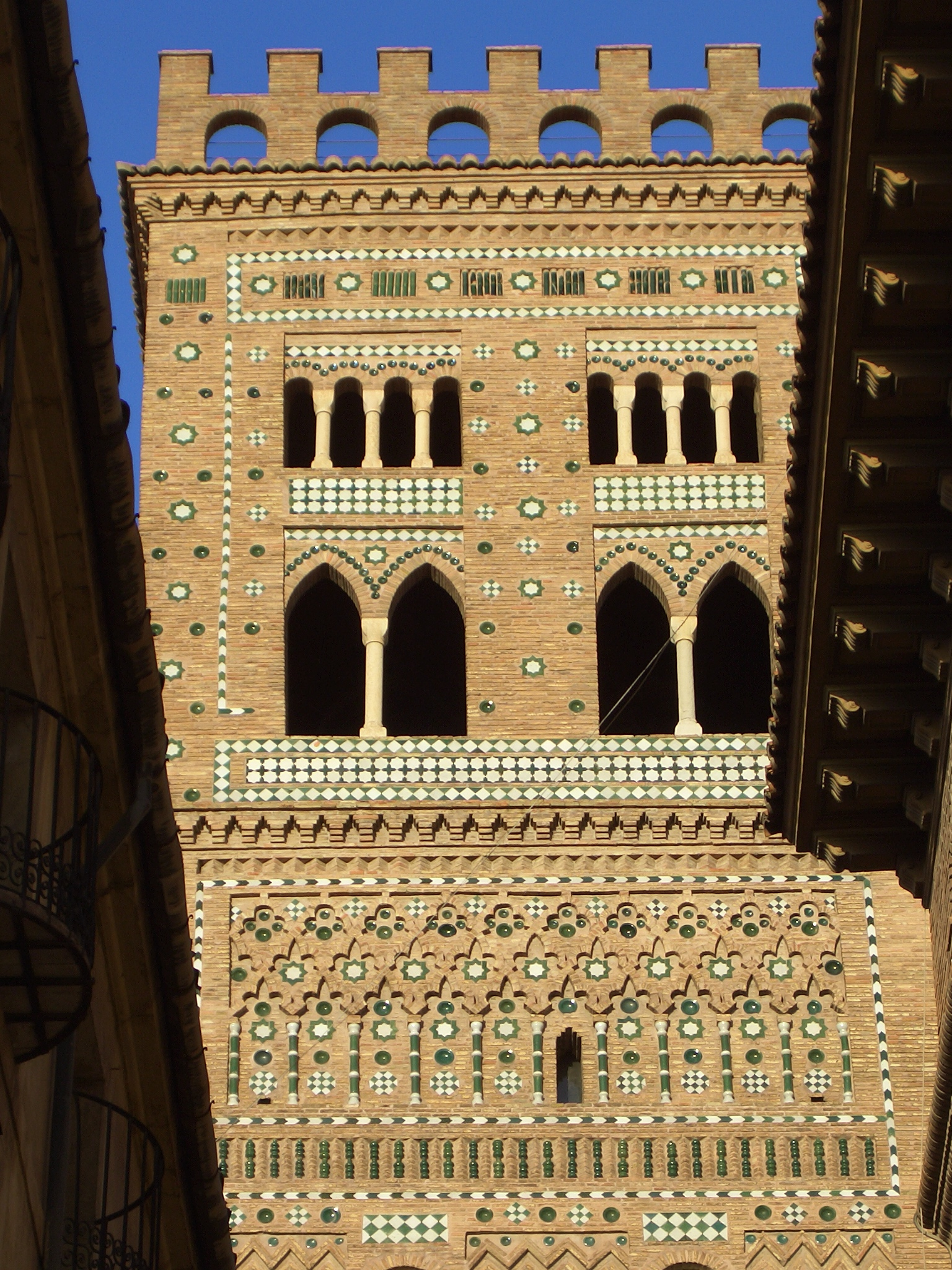

- Location within Spain
- 40.3420°N 1.1080°W
- Location: Teruel, Spain

Spanish Cultural Heritage
- Official name: Torre de la Iglesia de San Salvador
- Type: Non-movable
- Criteria: Monument
- Designated: 1911
- Reference no.: RI-51-0000101

The Tower of Iglesia de San Salvador (Spanish: Torre de la Iglesia de San Salvador) is a mudéjar bell tower located in Teruel, Spain.

It was declared Bien de Interés Cultural in 1911. It has been included in a World Heritage Site, originally called "Mudejar Architecture of Teruel" and later extended. It is believed that the mudéjar Tower of El Salvador may have been built during the first quarter of the 14th century based on the judges' account in the writings known as the Libro Verde de Teruel. Its more elaborate decoration and details, together with a more evolved structure than that of San Martín Tower, which it imitates, leads us to regard it as the more recent of the two (that is to say, after 1315-1316).

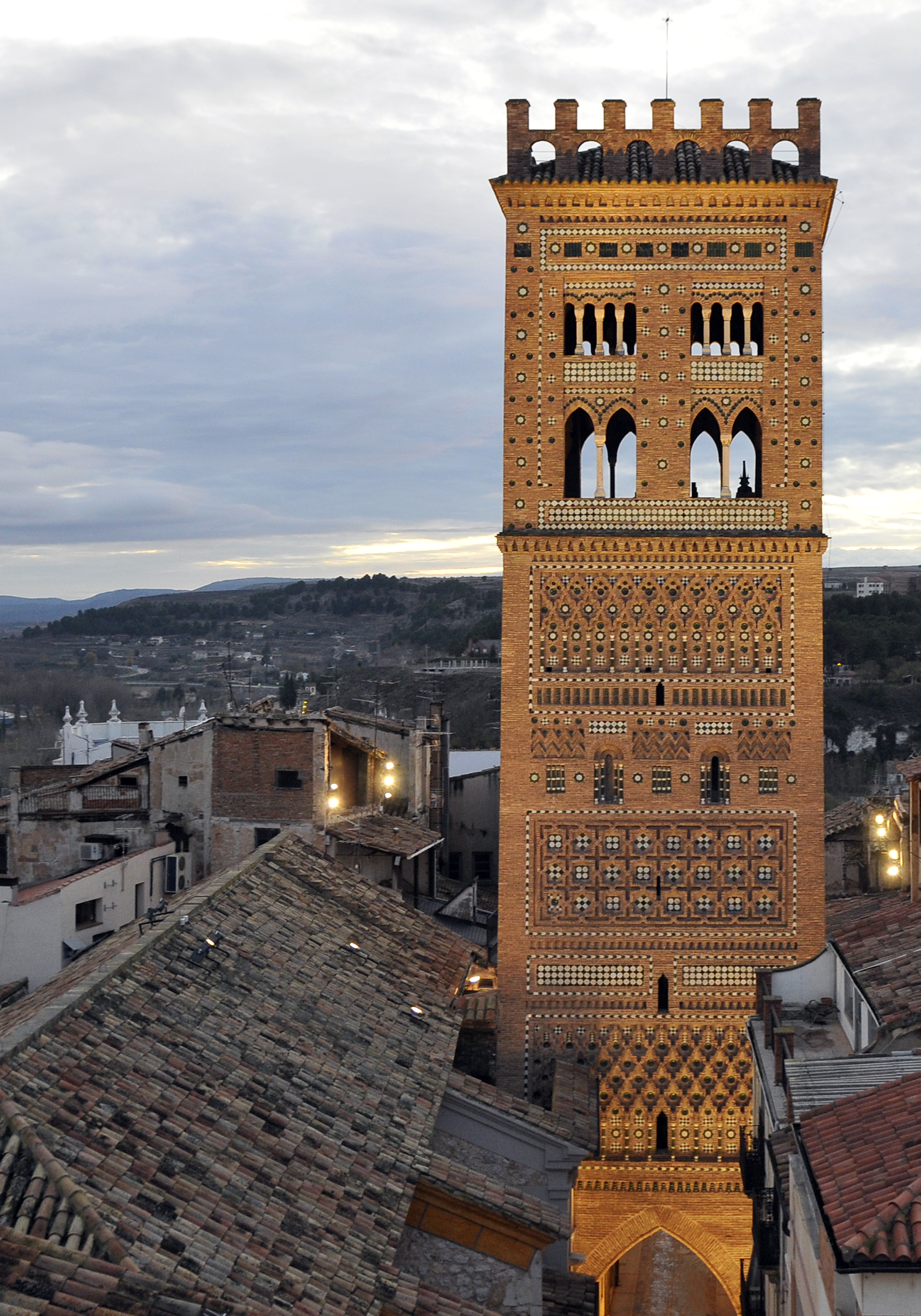
Tower of the church of San Salvador

High rising amid the Calle de El Salvador's neighbouring buildings, the tower is positioned connected to the baroque church of El Salvador, whose early structure fell apart in 1677. Within the city walls, El Salvador was placed just a few meters from the Portal of Guadalaviar. Its interior houses the Centro de Interpretación del Mudéjar (Center for the Interpretation of the Mudéjar Style) and it is open to visitors. It is advisable to visit it, since it offers one of the scarce opportunities that we have to look at the interior structure of Aragonese Mudéjar towers. The entry is found through a little door situated to the right if you are coming from the Paseo del Ovalo, just before arriving at the interior passage. This is not the original entrance, which is from the church interior; it was built expressly to make it accessible to the public who wish to view the audiovisual projections about the Mudéjar style in the city, an exhibition space and diverse explanatory panels that help one understand and become acquainted with these types of constructions that are found so frequently in Aragonese territory from the 14th through well into the 17th centuries.

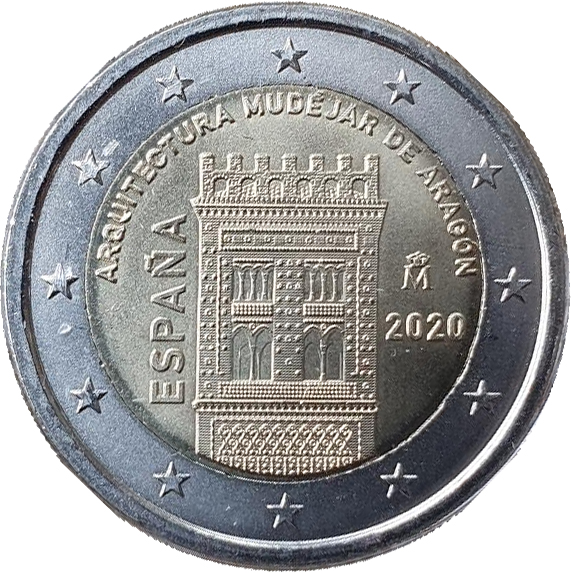

== See also ==
- List of Bienes de Interés Cultural in the Province of Teruel
- Mudéjar Architecture of Aragon — UNESCO World Heritage Site.
- The mudéjar Tower of El Salvador
