= List of Bienes de Interés Cultural in the Province of Teruel =

List of designated Bien de Interés Cultural landmarks in the Province of Teruel, Aragon, northeastern Spain.

== Landmarks ==
- Teruel Cathedral
- Tower of Iglesia de San Salvador
