= Mudéjar =

Muslims living under Christian rule on the Iberian Peninsula during the Reconquista

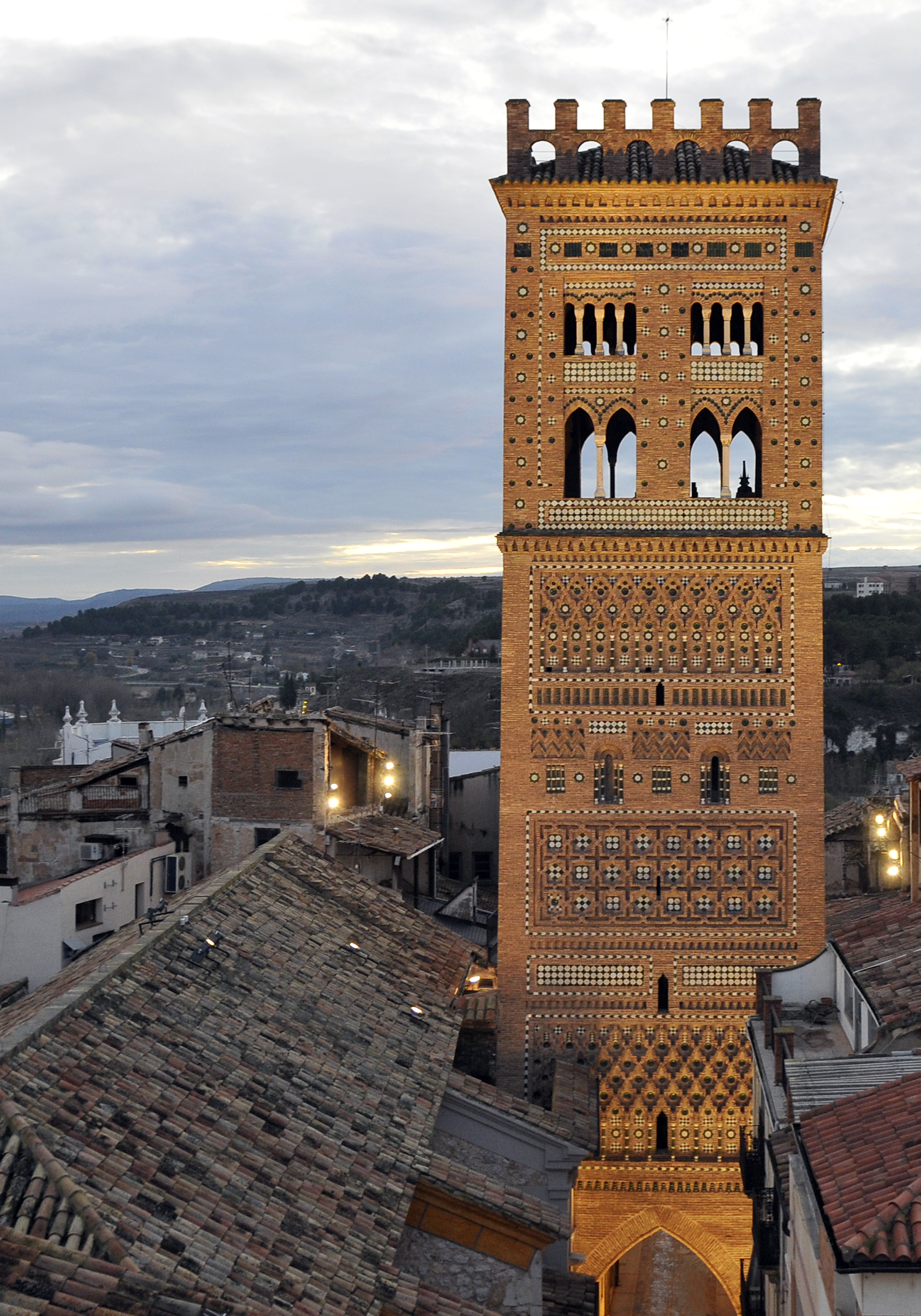
14th century tower of the church of San Salvador in Teruel, Spain, an example of what is known as Mudéjar art

The Mudéjar (Note: English: /muːˈdeɪhɑːr/ moo-DAY-har, US also /muːˈðɛhɑːr, muːˈðɛxɑːr/ moo-DHEH-har, moo-DHEKH-ar, Spanish: [muˈðexaɾ], Portuguese: [muˈðɛʒaɾ]; Catalan: mudèjar [muˈðɛʒəɾ]; from Arabic: مدجن, romanized: mudajjan, lit. 'subjugated; tamed; domesticated'.) were Muslims who remained in Iberia in the late medieval period following the Christian reconquest. It is also a term for Mudéjar art, which was greatly influenced by Islamic art, but produced typically by Christian craftsmen for Christian patrons. Mudéjar was used in contrast to both Muslims in Muslim-ruled areas (for example, Muslims of Granada before 1492) and Moriscos, who were often forcibly converted and may or may not have continued to secretly practice Islam. The corresponding term for Christians living under Muslim rule in medieval Iberia is Mozarabs.

Starting from the eleventh century, when larger regions previously under Muslim control fell to Christian kingdoms, treaties were established with the remaining Muslim population which defined their status as Mudejar. Their status, modelled after the dhimmi, established a parallel society with its own religious, legal, administrative and fiscal autonomy and institutions, while being subject to their Christian kings and lords. Soon after the fall of Granada in 1492, the policy towards the Mudéjar changed and eventually they were forced to either convert or emigrate.

== Etymology ==
Mudéjar was originally the term used for Moors or Muslims of Al-Andalus who remained in Iberia after the Christian Reconquista but were not initially forcibly converted to Christianity or exiled. The word Mudéjar references several historical interpretations and cultural borrowings. It was a medieval Castilian borrowing of the Arabic word Mudajjan مدجن, meaning "subjugated; tamed", or al-Madjun المدجون meaning "those who remained or stayed on", referring to Muslims who remained and submitted to the rule of Christian kings. The term likely originated as a taunt, as the word was usually applied to domesticated animals such as poultry. The term Mudéjar also can be translated from Arabic as "one permitted to remain", which refers to the Christians allowing Muslims to remain in Christian Iberia.

Another term with the same meaning, ahl al-dajn ("people who stay on"), was used by Muslim writers, notably al-Wansharisi in his work Kitab al-Mi'yar. Mudéjars in Iberia lived under a protected tributary status known as dajn, which refer to ahl al-dajn. This protected status suggested subjugation at the hands of Christian rulers, as the word dajn resembled haywanāt dājina meaning "tame animals". Their protected status was enforced by the fueros or local charters which dictated Christians laws. Muslims of other regions outside of the Iberian Peninsula disapproved of the Mudéjar subjugated status and their willingness to live under subjugation.

== History ==
=== Origin of the Mudéjar ===
In the eighth century, Arab and Berber forces defeated the Visigothic Kingdom in Spain and conquered the majority of the Iberian peninsula and ended the Visigothic kingdom that had ruled since the sixth century. The first Muslim emirate emerged in 756, followed by the Umayyad Caliphate of Córdoba from 929 to 1031. The 10th and 11th centuries saw the rise of Christian principalities in León, Castile, Asturias, Navarre, Aragón, and Catalonia. These kingdoms started retaking these territories and especially from the eleventh century onwards, larger groups of Muslims, who lived in these regions, came under Christian rule and became known as Mudejar. Especially influential in creating this new status was the surrender treaty during the conquest of Toledo where the fact that Muslims were a numerical majority allowed them to significantly influence the reasoning and wording of the treaty. Further conquests and treaties resulted in a permanent status of protection for Muslims widely acknowledged by all Christian authorities. These agreements in the Aragonese and Castilian frontier lands contrast with the strict policies of the Almoravids concerning dhimmis after 1130.

In the middle of the thirteenth century, Christian military success transformed the Iberian peninsula as several regions under Muslim control from the Algarve, the Guadalalquivir basin (including the cities of Cordoba and Seville) to the cities of Murcia and Valencia came under Christian control. There were two ways in which the Muslim populations were treated: those who accepted terms of surrender might be allowed to continue living in the region and became Mudéjar while those that held out to the bitter end and refused terms of surrender were expelled, though there were exceptions. As the newly acquired territories often lacked labour force, those that were willing to make themselves useful or had services to offer which made them valuable might be allowed to stay if they practised their religion discreetly. At the same time, there was a massive influx of Christian folk from the North.

=== Middle period ===
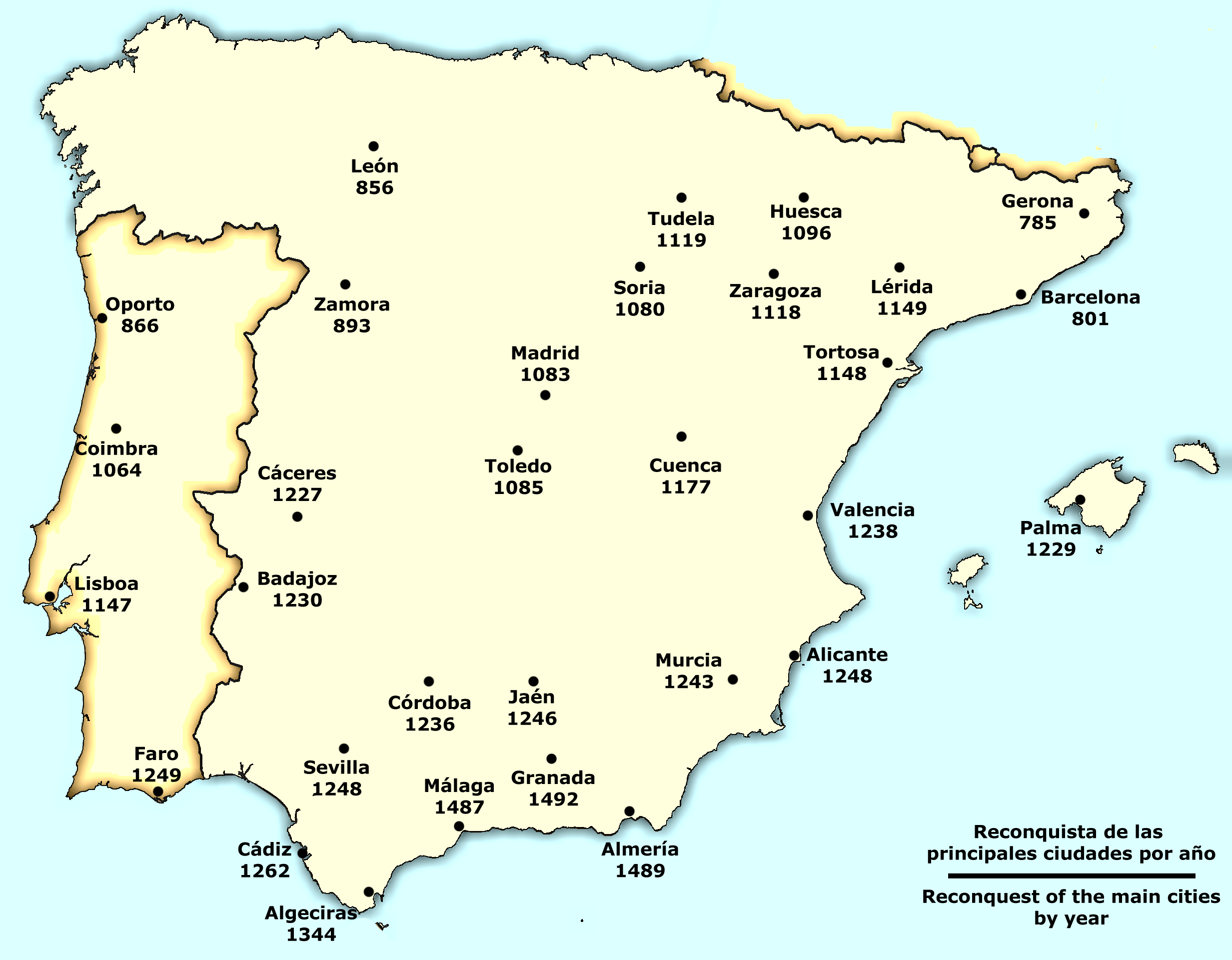
Reconquista of the main towns, per year (present-day state borders)

Soon after the conquests of these new territories, the Mudéjar of Andalucia rebelled 1264, instigated by the emirate of Granada. After some initial success, the revolt was quelled by joined Castilian and Aragonese forces by 1267. Then, king Alfonso X of Castile aimed to reconstruct Andalucia and Murcia by expelling the Mudéjar and persuading Christians to settle in the newly evacuated areas. Nevertheless, the conquered population were treated with relative tolerance and allowed to continue their religious observance, allowing for both King Fernando III (1217-1252) and Alfonso X (1252-1284) to name themselves as "King of the Three Religions". By 1300, only enclaves of Mudéjar remained in Andalucia. In Valencia, where the Mudéjar were in the majority, the Mudéjar revolted unsuccessfully soon after its conquest several times throughout the thirteenth century, in the 1270s with the help of their Marinid and Granadan allies.

At the beginning of the fourteenth century, the Mudéjar had apparently arrived in a stable equilibrium with the Christian-dominated society they lived in: they enjoyed a clearly defined and legitimate legal status with broad rights and privileges and had maintained their religious and personal liberties as well as cultural identity. This status, however, was changed by a series of crisis in the mid-fourteenth century, such as wars, economic uncertainty and most dramatically the Black Death (estimates put the peninsula's death rate at 30%). The Valencian Mudéjar revolted again in 1359 inspired by the messianic pretensions of a Mudéjar called Cilim and in 1364 due to the difficult conditions caused by the Aragonese war with Castile. At the same time, anti-Mudéjar violence, often fuelled by fears of the Mudéjar being a fifth column or spiriting Christians away to the slave markets of Granada or the Magrhib, was often directed against the morerías. As Maria Teresa Ferrer i Mallol points out, these attacks tended to coincide with periods of war with the sultanate of Granada or with rumours of possible Granadan attacks. The use of Granadan cavalry by king Peter the Cruel for raiding in Aragonese lands cultivated a popular fear of Mudéjar collaboration with the enemy which, while not generally true, was lend credence by occasional complicity of Mudéjar in Granadan raiding and spying for the Marinids. The Mudéjar population in Aragon was around one-third while in Valencia it was still around two-thirds.

These tensions intensified in the fifteenth century in which economic competition and depression, religious reactionism, continuing civil disorder and a growing threat of a war with the sultanate of Granada undermined the Christian-Muslim relations and stoked the perception of Muslims as disloyal, generically distinct foreigners. This, together with the Mudéjar's strengthening of relations with foreign Muslim regimes, resulted in the entrenchment of many Mudéjar communities across the Iberian peninsula. Especially the relation with the Ottoman Empire, whose advances threatened the Aragonese possession of Sicily, rendered the sultanate of Granada more formidable and the allegiance of the Mudéjar more uncertain. In 1487, both the sultanate of Granada as well as the Mudéjar established relations with the Ottomans, whom they saw as the last hope of saving the sultanate of Granada.

=== Decline and end ===
During the decade long war of the united crowns of Aragon and Castile against the sultanate of Granada, the Aragonese policy regarding Mudéjar did not change and they were not viewed as a military problem. Though it was reported in 1486 that the Mudéjar were funding the Granadan war effort, a likely possibility as the Mudéjar were bound to the last Islamic state on Spanish soil by religion and kinship and the Nasrid sultan likely exercised a spiritual leadership over the Valencian Mudéjar, the results of the investigation ordered by king Ferdinand II of Aragon are not known. As the prospect for a successful outcome for Granada faded, negotiations for surrender began and were finalised in November 1491. These capitulaciones were far more detailed and generous than those which had been current in the peninsula since the eleventh century, including security and freedom of movement for all Muslims, Islamic law in its broadest possible sense and visible signs of Christian domination to be minimised. Essentially, they created a functioning Islamic principality under Christian rule. This and the other postwar policies of Ferdinand II affirm his belief in the continuing viability of Mudejarism and the view that the Mudéjar were a valuable asset. Though most of the Muslim aristocrats emigrated to North Africa, most religious authorities and common folk remained, some even returning after having first chosen to emigrate to North Africa. The equilibrium was further upheld by the newly installed archbishop Talavera, who adhered to the letter and spirit of the capitulaciones and took an optimistic approach to missionising and an open approach to the maintenance of folk customs.

By 1498 this balanced approach broke down as Mudéjar were banned from living in Granada and the militant Cardinal Cisneros set out to abrogate the capitulaciones by coercing Mudéjar to convert and suppressing public manifestations of Arabo-Islamic culture, most notably by confiscating and publicly burning Islamic religious texts. In response, the Mudéjar of Granada rose in rebellion and the region was not subdued until 1501. After that, the Mudéjar of Granada were given the choice to remain and accept baptism, reject baptism and be enslaved or be exiled. Just a couple of years prior, in 1497, Islam had been outlawed by Portugal, possibly as king Manuel I aimed to obtain rights of sovereignty over the kingdom of Fez from the pope. Soon afterwards, after several Mudéjar populations in Castile had converted, Ferdinand and Isabella promulgated a decree ordering the conversion or departure of all Muslims remaining in the Crown of Castile in 1502. After that, the last redoubt of medieval European Islam was the Crown of Aragon, though Mudéjar were now in the minority amounting to some 30%.

The death of Ferdinand II in 1516 sparked another political transformation in which Spain became part of the Hapsburg bloc, set against the equally powerful Ottoman Sultanate and its ally France, and was ruled by Carlos I who was little disposed to tolerate "enemies of the faith". During the Revolt of the Brotherhoods, in which local craftsmen rebelled against royal authority, the Mudéjar were seen as confederates of the aristocracy and therefore attacked. Carlos I., however, also turned against them and issued in 1526 an edict that ordered the suppression of Islamic worship and traditions in the Crown of Aragon. This transformed it, like the rest of the "new kingdom of Spain", into a nation of Christians alone. Following the forced conversions, the newly baptised Christians faced suspicions that they were not truly converted but remained crypto-Muslims, and were known as Moriscos. The Moriscos, too, were eventually expelled, in 1609–1614.

== Islamic legal opinions ==
The existence of Mudéjar posed series of problems for their religion as Islam pays great attention to models of conduct provided by good Muslims of the past. As Islam had until then never lived on a permanent basis in the territory of a non-Muslim ruler and Islam had been a religion of expansion, no guidance was forthcoming for Muslims living now under Christian rule. The fatwa of Ibn Rabi, a thirteenth century native of Cordoba, classified Mudéjar and their obligation to emigrate according to a graduate scale of sin. Mudéjar absorbed by the enemy and living dispersed among them committed the greatest sin, comparable to polytheism. Muslims living in a special quarter and avoiding to mingle with the enemy, was held at a minor fault. The third case consisted of the case where Mudéjar constituted the majority of a region and non-Muslims lived only in castles controlling the region. These Mudéjar were held at even greater obligation to emigrate as due to their numerical priority, in a position of strength, they should be either able to revolt or travel undisturbed. Ibn Rabi did not mention the potential for the Mudéjar's continued adherence to Islamic law for this would have undermined his intention to push them towards emigration, which was based on his political agenda.

The view that Muslims should emigrate was also taken by the late fifteenth century mufti Ahmad al-Wansharisi who cited the opinion of Ibn Rushd that the obligation to emigrate from countries under infidel control would continue right up to judgement day. Al-Wansharisi thought that coexistence led to erosion of the distinctive features of Muslim life, such as the use of Arabic, which in turn led to neglect of worship. The Oran fatwa from 1504 took a different position and even allowed Mudéjar to pretend to be Christians given the forced conversions.

== Mudéjar social status in Spain ==
Just as previously the Christians, whose place had been defined by their Muslim conquerors and who were subject to the dhimmi status, the Muslims became second class citizens who endured restrictions on their activities but also were granted specific rights. These rights and obligations were established by the Muslims surrender treaties (either written, understood or applied as custom law) which established a parallel society with its own religious, legal and administrative and fiscal autonomy and institutions, while being subject to the royal and seigneurial authority. As such, Muslim administrators oversaw the Muslims and their taxes were collected by Muslim tax collectors, while the perhaps most important grant was that they were allowed to be governed by Islamic law and be able to practice their faith. Sometimes Mozarabic Christians were employed in the government of the Mudejar as they were familiar with their language and customs and the Muslim elites would often flee as Islamic law forbade them to submit to the authority of infidels.

Though in principle the Mudéjar were directly subject to royal fiscal and judicial jurisdiction, Mudéjar were also found to be subject to the authority and paying taxes to lay lords, municipalities, dioceses as well as the monarchy. Especially in the crown of Aragon, where the king could not tax without the consent of the cortes, the Mudéjar aljamas formed an important and flexible component of the royal fisc.

As was common at the time in both Christian and Muslim societies, Muslims were segregated from Christians. Both societies often held each other in contempt, demanded civic expression of their respective revelations and feared any assimilation from the infidel. Intimate relations between members of both faiths were forbidden by both Christian and Islamic law, but they did occur anyway.

While Mudéjar were often the object of "exploitation", so was also the rest of the medieval common class. In certain ways they even enjoyed protections their Christian counterparts did not have, such as against torture and execution as well as a right to appeal at the royal court, though in some ways they were more vulnerable to violence and abuse. The surrender terms varied between the different regions, resulting in differences between the legal status of the Mudéjar.

=== Castile ===
The Muslim population in Castile originally immigrated from Toledo, Seville and other Andalusi territories. They were not original to the land in Castile. Muslim immigration into Castile was a sponsored settlement by the Kingdom of Castile. It is hypothesized that the slow-growing Christian population demonstrated a need to bring more people into Castile. Primary documents written by Castilians in the 13th century indicate that Muslims were able to maintain some agency under Christian rule; The Mudéjars were able to maintain their religion, their laws, and had their own judges. The Mudéjars in Castile spoke the same Romance languages and dialects as their Christian neighbors.

=== Aragon and Catalonia ===
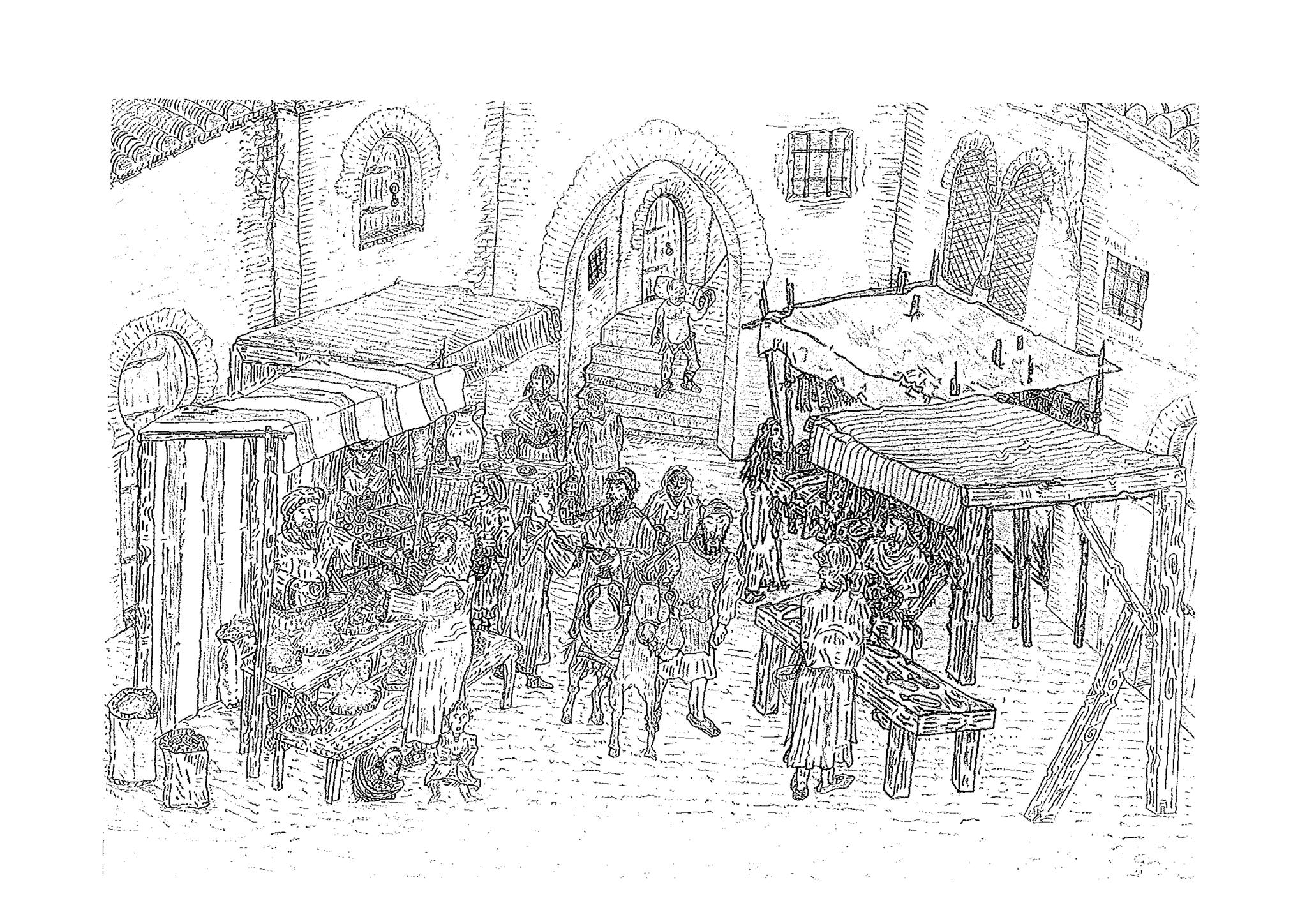
Market street or Assoc (from the Arabic As-Suq) of the Morería (medieval Muslim quarter) of the Catalan city of Lleida/Lérida between late 13th century and early 14th century.

Like the Mudéjars in Castile, Aragonese and Catalan Mudéjars also spoke the Romance languages of their Christian counterparts. However, unlike the Mudéjars in Castile, there were Muslim villages in Aragon and, to a lesser extent, in south-western Catalonia which populated the land before the Christian reconquests, setting up a history of Muslim cultivation and population of the land. Besides the large Muslim populations in Granada and Valencia, the Aragonese Muslim peasants were the most well-established Muslim community in the region, while in Catalonia Muslim autochthonous presence was limited only to the Low Ebro and Low Segre areas. Aragonese and Catalan Muslims were under the jurisdiction of the Aragonese Crown and were designated a special status. This status applied to the Mudéjar cultivators, the exarici, and this status made them subservient to their Christian superiors because by law they were required to cultivate the land of royal estates. However, this status was also beneficial as the law suggested that this land be passed down through Muslim family members. Despite their expulsion at the end of the Morisco period, the Mudéjars in Aragon left evidence of their style in architecture, while in Catalonia only some reminiscences of this can be appreciated in some Gothic churches and cathedrals in some shires of Lleida. From the mid fourteenth century, several Mudéjar were used as diplomats by the Aragonese crown.

Lleida in Catalonia was, besides Tortosa, the only major Catalan town to have a Muslim quarter, at which its numerous Muslim population of Andalusi origins, was organized as a community (Aljama or Al-Jama'ah), even though there were also Muslims living outside the quarter. Its Muslim population descended from the population that did not leave Madinat Larida when it was taken over from the Moors by the counts of Urgell and Barcelona. The autochthonous Muslim community, largely composed of a mix of skilled artisans, laborers, and peasants, although progressively diminishing throughout the Middle Ages by emigration to the neighbouring Kingdom of Aragon, to the nearby increasingly powerful and numerous Aljamas of Aitona and Serós, and to Islamic countries (Al-Hijrah) as well as by increasing conversions to Christianity, was nevertheless also being reinforced by immigration of Navarrese and Aragonese Muslims (Mudéjares) and by intermittent arrivals of Valencian, Granadan, and North African origin, these being mostly slaves or former slaves. The quarter and its Aljama or community enjoyed a special status within the social reality of the city, with its own elites: Alfaquins, Cadís and Sabasales (Al-Fuqaha, Al-Qudat and Ashab As-Salat, that is, Islamic scholars, Islamic Judges and Imams respectively); Escrivans (Scrives); Alamins (Al-'Amin), or officials that represented the Aljama before the king (in case of the royal Aljamas) or the feudal lords (in case of the rural manor Aljamas), etc. The Morería had its Mosque (Al-Masjid), its baths (Al-Hammam), its cemetery (Al-Maqbara, in the outskirts of the city), its Halal butchery, its market or Assoc (As-Suq) and its bakery. The Aljama suffered a period of decadence throughout the late Middle Ages, leading to its progressive reduction in numbers and privileges, up to the forced conversions of the late medieval period, and finally its total expulsion from the city during the early modern period.

=== Valencia ===
In the 13th century, the Aragonese Christians conquered Valencia. Unlike in Aragon and in Catalonia, the Mudéjar population in Valencia outnumbered Christians in the area, amounting to two-thirds of the Valencian population in the late fourteenth century. In Valencia, the majority of communities were peasant, Arabic-speaking and Muslim. Not long after the kingdom of Valencia had been conquered, the Mudéjar rose in rebellion in the 1240s, then again in the 1250s, 1260s and 1270s with the support of Marinid and Granadan allies. Though not demonstratively a direct response to these revolts, the terrible anti-Muslim social riots of 1275-1276 originated in an atmosphere of heightened tension. The Mudéjar further defected to the Castilian during the war of the two Peters and revolted again in 1359 and 1364. Anti-Mudéjar riots took place again in 1309 and 1455, though the Mudéjar were under protection of the Crown. By 1450 the Mudéjar constituted only 30% of the Valencian population.

== See also ==
- Mozarabs

== Sources ==
- Burns, Robert I. (4 December 2013). "Mudéjars". In Gerli, E. Michael (ed.). Medieval Iberia: An Encyclopedia. Routledge. pp. 591–592. ISBN 978-1-136-77162-0.
- Catlos, Brian A. (20 March 2014). Muslims of Medieval Latin Christendom, c.1050–1614. Cambridge University Press. ISBN 978-0-521-88939-1.
- Echevarria, Anna (28 March 2021). "Islamic influence on Christian legislation in the kingdom of Castile". In Berend, Nora (ed.). Minority Influences in Medieval Society. Routledge. ISBN 978-1-000-37019-5.
- Frassetto, Michael (12 November 2019). Christians and Muslims in the Middle Ages: From Muhammad to Dante. Rowman & Littlefield. ISBN 978-1-4985-7757-1.
- Harvey, L. P. (1992). Islamic Spain, 1250 to 1500. Chicago: University of Chicago Press. ISBN 978-0-226-31962-9.
- Harvey, L. P. (May 16, 2005). Muslims in Spain, 1500 to 1614. Chicago: University of Chicago Press. ISBN 978-0-226-31963-6.
- Meyerson, Mark D. (15 November 2023). The Muslims of Valencia in the Age of Fernando and Isabel: Between Coexistence and Crusade. Univ of California Press. ISBN 978-0-520-33495-3.
- Miller, Kathryn A. (2008). Guardians of Islam: Religious Authority and Muslim Communities of Late Medieval Spain. New York: Columbia University Press. ISBN 9780231136129.
- O'Callaghan, Joseph F. (17 March 2011). The Gibraltar Crusade: Castile and the Battle for the Strait. University of Pennsylvania Press. ISBN 978-0-8122-0463-6.
