= Mudéjar architecture of Aragon =

World Heritage Site in Aragon, Spain

Mudejar Architecture of Aragon
UNESCO World Heritage Site
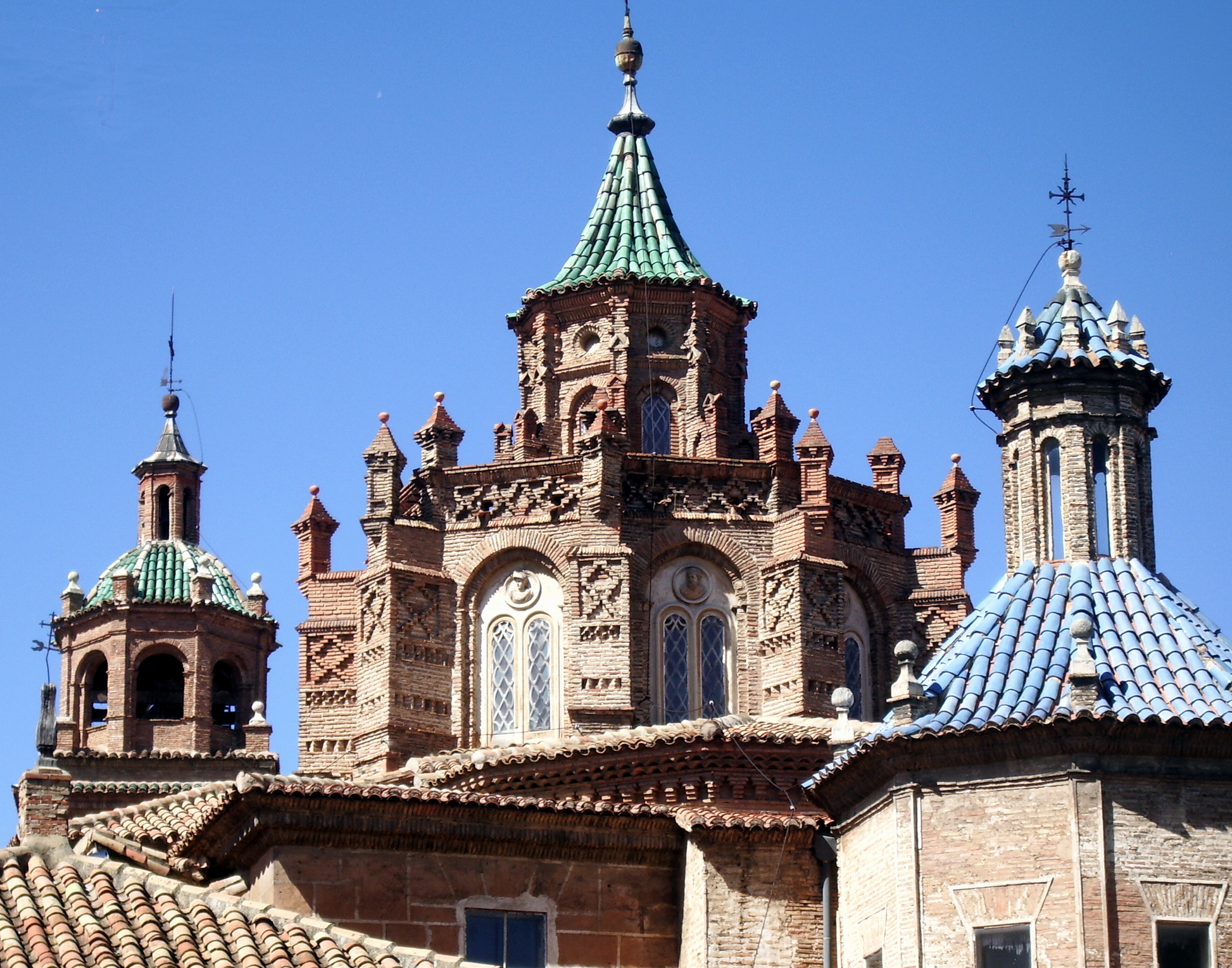
- Dome of Teruel Cathedral
- Location: Aragon, Spain
- Includes: 10 sites in Teruel, Calatayud, Cervera de la Cañada, Tobed and Zaragoza
- Criteria: Cultural: (iv)
- Reference: 378ter
- Inscription: 1986 (10th Session)
- Extensions: 2001
- Area: 4.269 ha (0.01648 sq mi)
- Buffer zone: 20.063 ha (0.07746 sq mi)
- Main sites in Aragon

Mudéjar architecture of Aragon is an aesthetic trend in Mudéjar style in Aragon, Spain, and has been recognized in some representative buildings as a World Heritage Site by UNESCO.

The chronology of the Aragonese Mudéjar occupies 12th to the 17th century and includes more than a hundred architectural monuments located predominantly in the valleys of the Ebro, Jalón, and Jiloca.

The first manifestations of Aragonese Mudéjar have two origins: on the one hand, a palatial architecture linked to the monarchy, which amends and extends the Aljafería Palace maintaining Islamic ornamental tradition, and on the other hand, a tradition which develops Romanesque architecture using brickwork rather than masonry construction and which often displays Hispanic-rooted ornamental tracery. Examples of the latter type of Mudéjar architecture can be seen in churches in Daroca, which were started in stone and finished off in the 13th century with Mudéjar brick panels.

From a structural point of view, the Mudéjar architecture in Aragon preferably adopts functional schemes of Cistercian Gothic, but with some differences. Buttresses are often absent, especially in the apses which characteristically have an octagonal floor plan with thick walls that can hold the thrust from the roof and which provide space to highlight brick decorations. On the other hand, buttresses are often a feature of the naves, where they may be topped by turrets, as in the style of the Basilica of Our Lady of the Pillar. There may be side chapels which are not obvious from the exterior. Churches in neighborhoods (such as San Pablo of Zaragoza) or small towns do not usually have aisles, but locations for additional altars are provided by chapels between the nave buttresses. It is common for these side chapels to have a closed gallery or ándite (walkway), with windows looking to the outside and inside of the building. This constitution is called a church-fortress, and his prototype could be the church of Montalbán.

Typically, the bell towers show extraordinary ornamental development, the structure being inherited from the Islamic minaret: quadrangular with central pier whose spaces are filled via a staircase approximation vaults, as in the Almohad minarets. On this body stood the tower, usually polygonal. There are also examples of octagonal towers.

== World Heritage Site ==
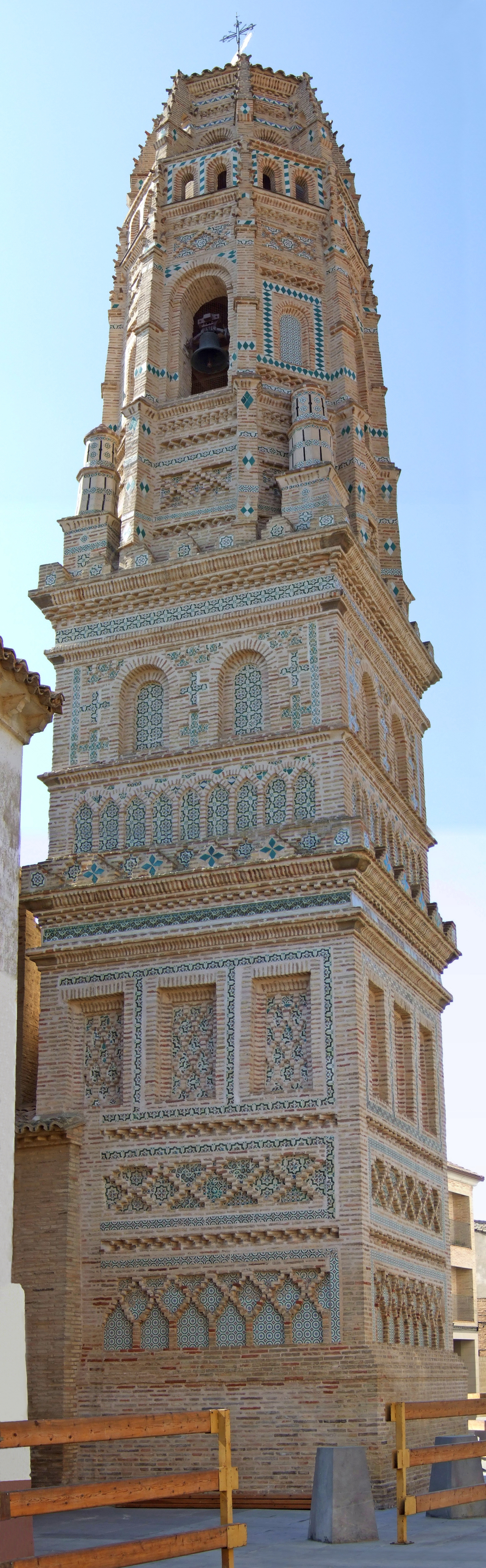
Tower of the Church of Utebo.

In 1986, Unesco declared the whole Mudéjar complex of Teruel a World Heritage Site, which was extended in 2001 to include other Aragonese Mudejar monuments:

Code	Name	Place	Year
378-001	Tower, roof and dome of the Cathedral of Saint Mary of Mediavilla	Teruel	1986
378-002	Tower and church of San Pedro	Teruel	1986
378-003	Tower and church of San Martín	Teruel	1986
378-004	Tower of the church of San Salvador	Teruel	1986
378-005	Apse, cloister and tower of Colegiata de Santa María	Calatayud	2001
378-006	Parish church of Santa Tecla	Cervera de la Cañada	2001
378-007	Church of Saint Mary	Tobed	2001
378-008	Mudéjar remains of the Palace of Aljafería	Zaragoza	2001
378-009	Tower and Parish church of San Pablo	Zaragoza	2001
378-010	Apse, parish and dome of La Seo	Zaragoza	2001

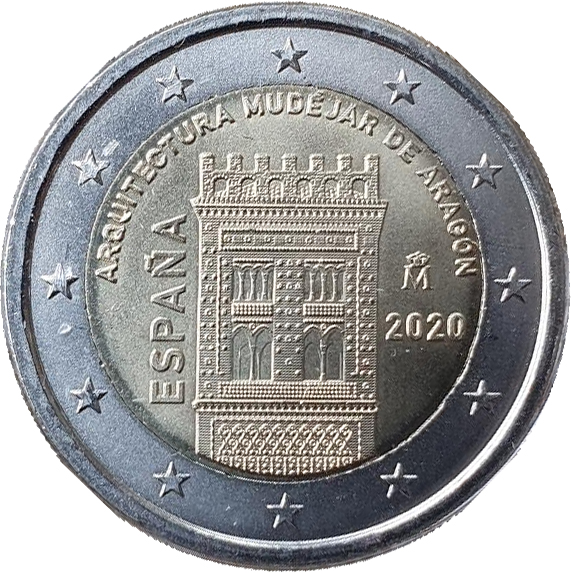
Spanish 2 Euro coin commemorating Mudéjar Architecture of Aragón, 2020

The description of the importance reads as follows:

The development in the twelfth century Mudejar art in Aragon is a consequence of the political, social and cultural conditions that prevailed in Spain after the Reconquista. This art, influenced by Islamic tradition, also reflects various contemporary European styles, particularly Gothic. Present until the beginning of the seventeenth century, is characterized by extremely refined and inventive use of brick and glazed tiles in architecture, especially in church steeples.

— UNESCO, World Heritage Centre, Statement about Mudejar Architecture of Aragon on the website of UNESCO.,

The justification for the statement is supported by the organization's selection criterion IV that call the Mudejar Architecture of Aragon "an outstanding example of a type of building, architectural or technological ensemble or landscape which illustrates a significant period in human history."

== See also ==
- List of Mudéjar buildings in Aragon, including non-World Heritage Sites.

== Bibliography ==
- Gonzalo Borrás Gualis, Mudejar art in Teruel, Teruel Studies Institute, 1990. ISBN 84-86982-22-7.
