= Teruel Cathedral =

Cathedral of Saint Mary of Mediavilla of Teruel
- Catedral de Santa María de Mediavilla de Teruel
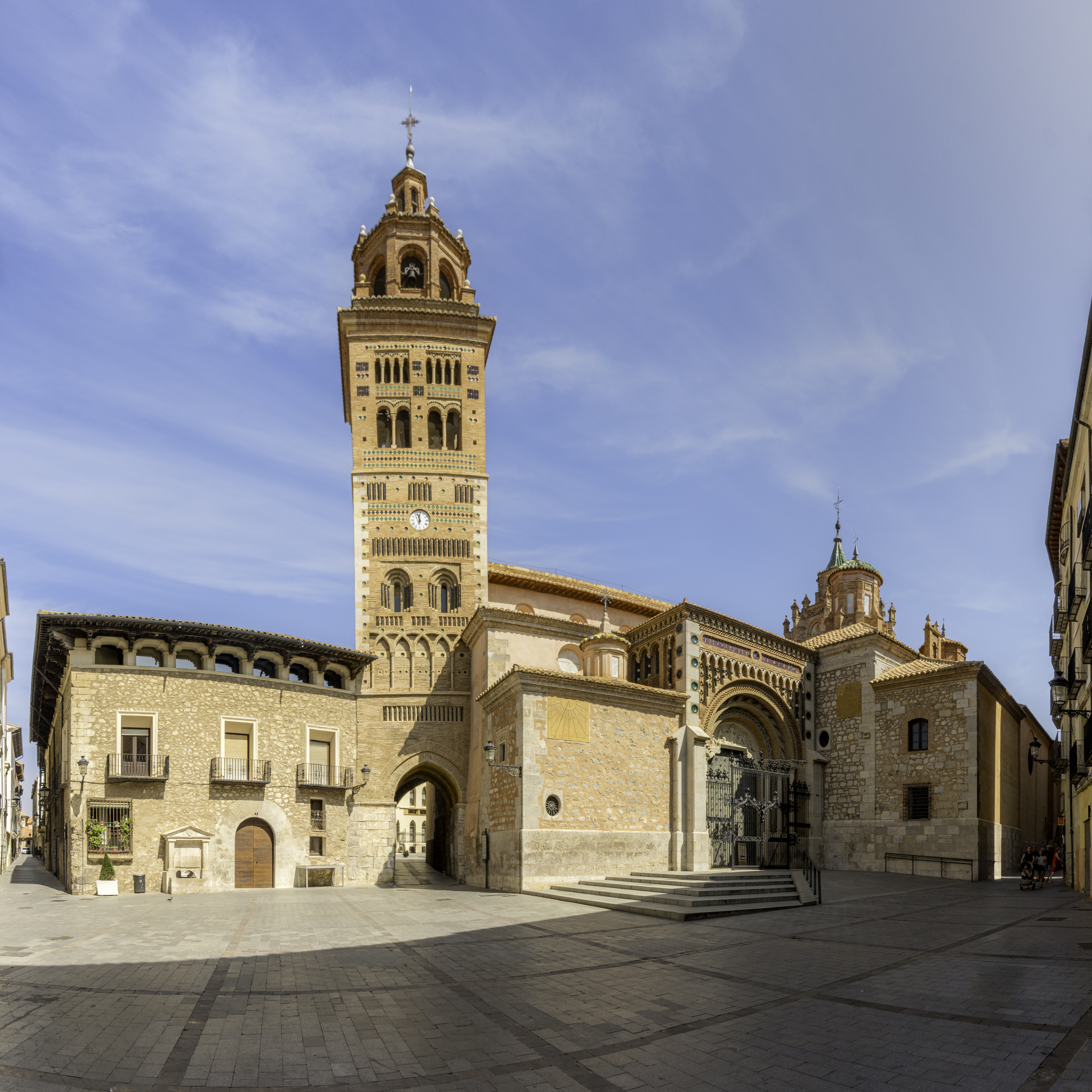

Religion
- Affiliation: Catholic Church
- Year consecrated: 1587
- Status: Cathedral

Location
- Location: Teruel, Spain
- Interactive map of Cathedral of Saint Mary of Mediavilla of Teruel
- Coordinates: 40°20′38″N 01°06′26″W

Architecture
- Type: Church
- Style: Mudéjar, Romanesque, Gothic, Renaissance
- Groundbreaking: 1171

UNESCO World Heritage Site
- Official name: Tower, roof and dome of the Cathedral of Saint Mary of Mediavilla
- Part of: Mudéjar Architecture of Aragon
- Criteria: Cultural: (iv)
- Reference: 378ter
- Inscription: 1986 (10th Session)
- Extensions: 2001, 2016

Spanish Cultural Heritage
- Type: Non-movable
- Criteria: Monument
- Designated: 3 June 1931
- Reference no.: RI-51-0000925

Teruel Cathedral or Catedral de Santa María de Mediavilla de Teruel is a Roman Catholic church in Teruel, Aragon, Spain. Dedicated to St. Mary, it is a notable example of Mudéjar architecture. Together with other churches in the town and in the province of Zaragoza, it has been listed as a UNESCO World Heritage Site since 1986.

== History ==
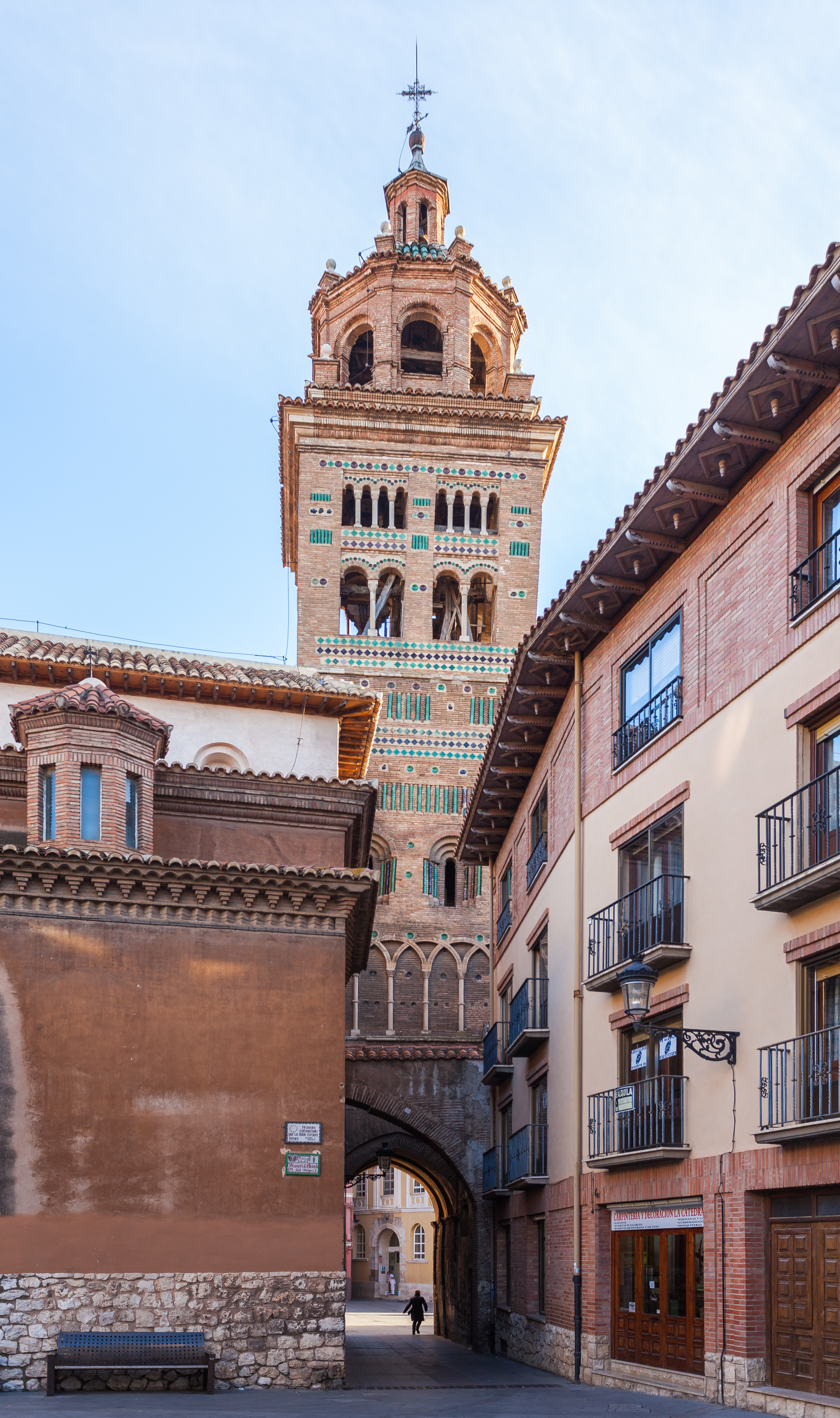
Tower of the Cathedral

The Cathedral of Teruel has its origins in the church of Santa María de Mediavilla, upon which work started in Romanesque style in 1171 and ended with the erection of the Mudéjar tower in 1257. In the second half of the 13th century, the Morisco alarife Juzaff restructured the old Romanesque work and endowed the building with three Mudéjar naves of masonry and brick.

The Romanesque apses were replaced in the same Gothic-Mudéjar style as early as the 14th century, as can be seen in the head of the major chapel. The number of supports was reduced by half, leading to greater luminosity and spaciousness in the pointed arch naves. Additionally, the walls were enlarged. In 1423, the Aragonese pontiff Antipope Benedict XIII, the so-called "Pope Luna," raised it to the rank of a collegiate church. The Mudéjar aspect has changed little since then.

In 1538, the lantern tower of the central nave was built by Martín de Montalbán in the Plateresque-Mudéjar style. It was built on an octagonal plan on squinches and has on its exterior ajimezate windows with Plateresque decorations. Later, in 1587, with the creation of the diocese of Teruel, the building was promoted to the status of Cathedral and consecrated as such. Finally, in 1909, the facade was constructed in Neo-mudéjar style based on a design of Pau Monguió.

== The tower ==
The Mudejar tower began to be erected in 1257; its lower part is a barrel vault that passers-by can walk through. It is one of the oldest Mudéjar towers in Spain. It is square in shape with three sides profusely decorated with azulejos and ceramic glaze. The top is an octagonal roof lantern from the 17th century.

== Mudéjar reform ==
After the completion of the Mudéjar tower, further changes were made in the second half of the 13th century under the direction of the Moor Juzaff – the elevation of the naves (in the line of the Gothic raising the temples), the construction of new Mudéjar apses, and the covering of the naves with ceilings in this same style.

Construction for the first part of the building had advanced from the apses to the Mudéjar tower. Now, renovations proceeded in the opposite direction. Indeed, once the height of the three naves was raised and its illumination enhanced, and the new Mudéjar ceiling over the central nave was arranged, the primitive head was undoubtedly dwarfed and disproportionate in relation to the new naves. Therefore, a crossing and three new apses were constructed. This work was completed with the dismantling of centrings and with the plastering and painting thereof in 1335, according to a list of accounts kept in the Cathedral archive. The director of these last plastering works was the Moorish master from Coglor, Yuçaf de Huzmel.

== Ceiling of the central nave ==
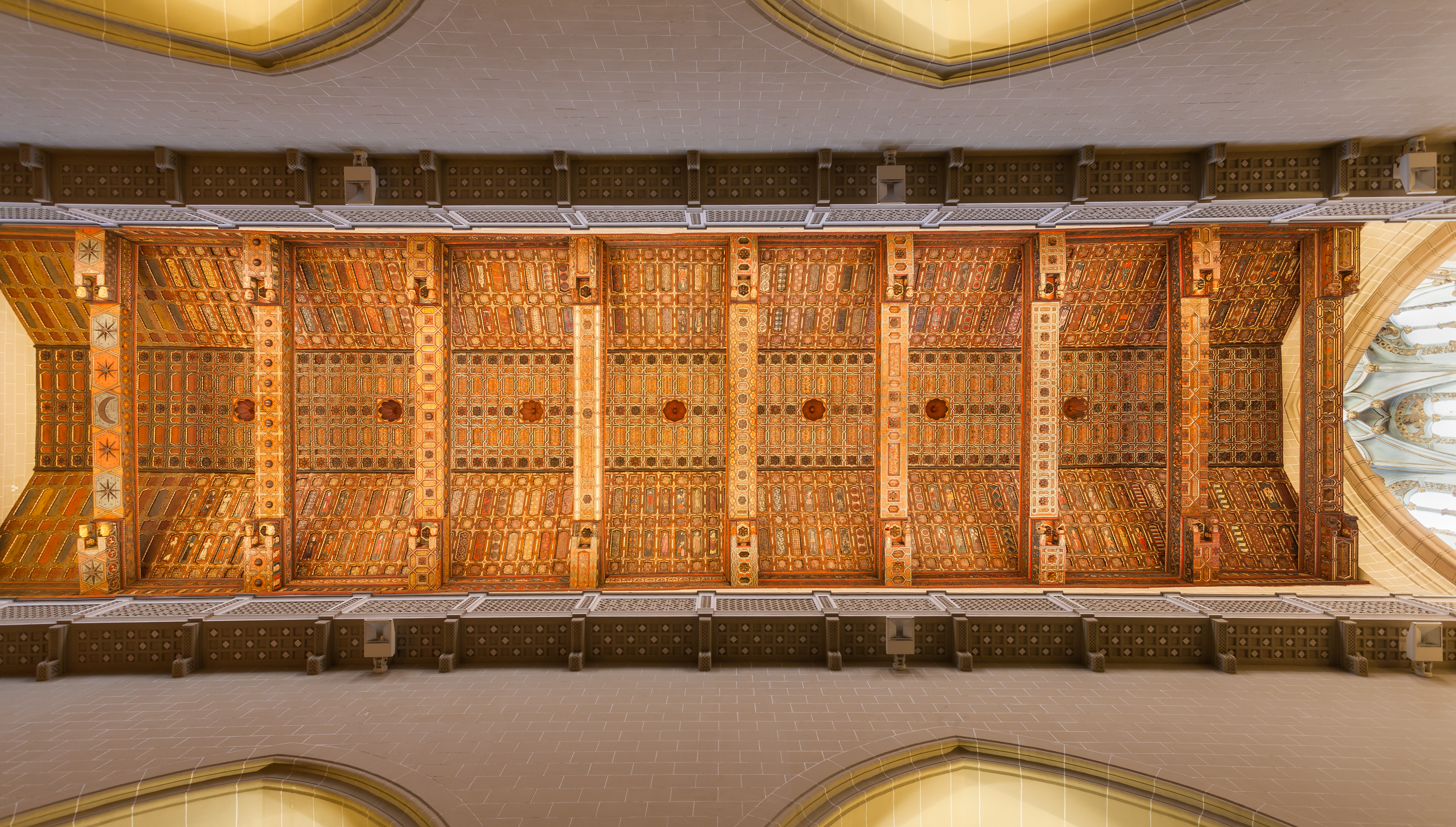
The cathedral's mudéjar coffered ceiling

Almost all Mudéjar ceilings are coffered, that is, merely decorative elements. In this case, it is a roof covering, whose framework supports the upper part of the nave and consolidates the structure. It has been called the "Sistine Chapel" of Mudéjar art, for its great architectural and pictorial value. It measures 32 meters in length and dates from 14th century. In its coffers are paintings of officers, craftsmen, historical figures, and fantastic beings. These diverse human types and extensive variety in pictorial imagery are well preserved because they were covered by a false Neoclassical ceiling in the 18th century, which protected the paintings from inclement weather.

Some damage was suffered in the bombings of the Spanish Civil War, but this was repaired.

== Lantern tower ==
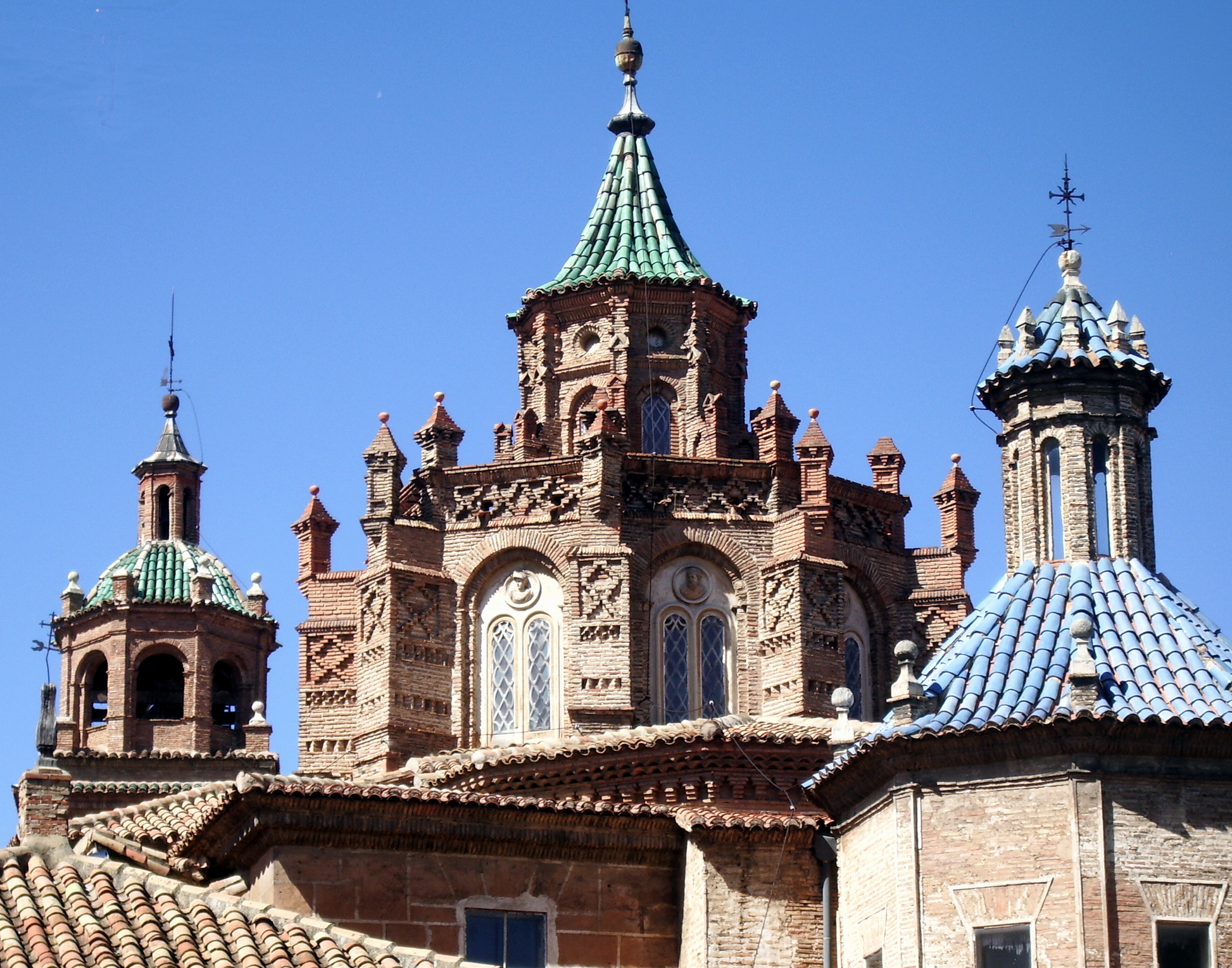
Mudéjar lantern tower

The lantern tower was designed in 1537 by the master Juan Lucas "Botero", who had been the architect of the lantern tower on Mudejar squinches of the Seo of Zaragoza and of the Cathedral of Tarazona. It was carried out in 1538 by the master builder Martín de Montalbán. The lantern tower illuminated the new main altarpiece (1536), a Renaissance masterpiece of the sculptor Gabriel Yoly.

== Recent construction ==
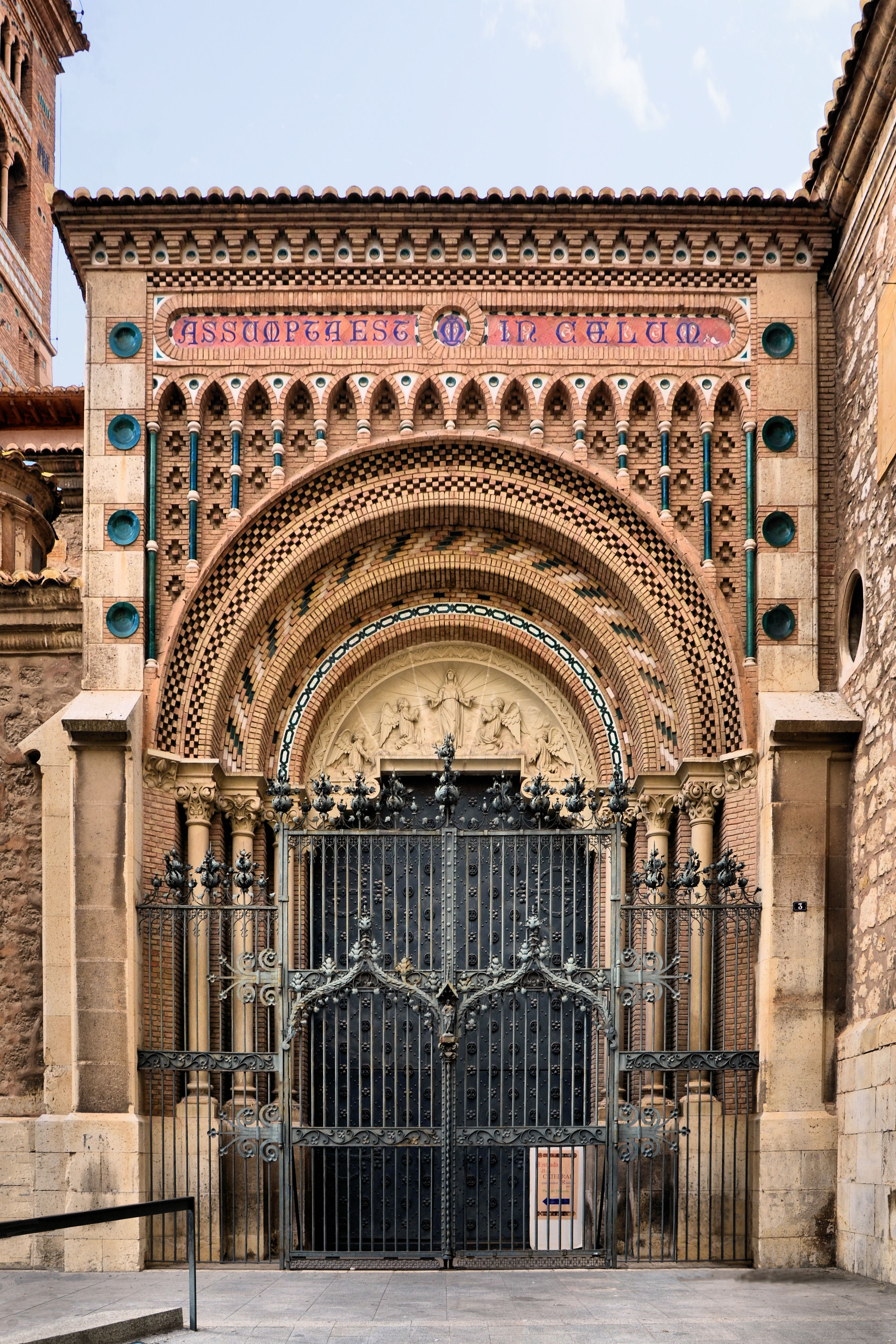
The Neo-mudéjar southern facade (1909)

Around the year 1700, the Gothic head was modified to create an ambulatory. Likewise, the ornamentation was modified to adapt it to the Neoclassical tastes, hiding behind the false ceiling of the 18th century, the original Mudéjar roof, which allowed the painting to be conserved.

In 1909, the enormous historicist southern façade was constructed, which combines a Neo-Romanesque structure of semicircular archivolts with a typically neo-Mudéjar decoration. It was planned by the Modernisme architect Pau Monguió. The portico closes with an iron gate by Matías Abad, which was inspired by the choir inside the cathedral, made by the 15th century master Cañamache.

== World Heritage Site ==
The tower, roofing and lantern tower of the Cathedral of Teruel were declared, together with the Mudéjar monumental ensemble of the city, a World Heritage Site by UNESCO in 1986. According to the declaration:

The development in the 12th century of Mudejar art in Aragon resulted from the particular political, social and cultural conditions that prevailed in Spain after the Reconquista. This art, influenced by Islamic tradition, also reflects various contemporary European styles, particularly the Gothic. Present until the early 17th century, it is characterized by an extremely refined and inventive use of brick and glazed tiles in architecture, especially in the belfries.

— Declaration of the Aragonese Mudéjar in the official page of the UNESCO.

== See also ==
- Catholic Church in Spain
- Mudéjar Architecture of Aragon
- High medieval domes
- 16th-century Western domes

== Bibliography ==
- Santiago Sebastián; Artesonado de la catedral de Teruel. Savings Bank and Mount of Piety of Zaragoza, Aragón and La Rioja (Ibercaja, Obra Social y Cultural) 1981 ISBN 84-500-4979-2
