= Cervera de la Cañada =

Cervera de la Cañada, Spain
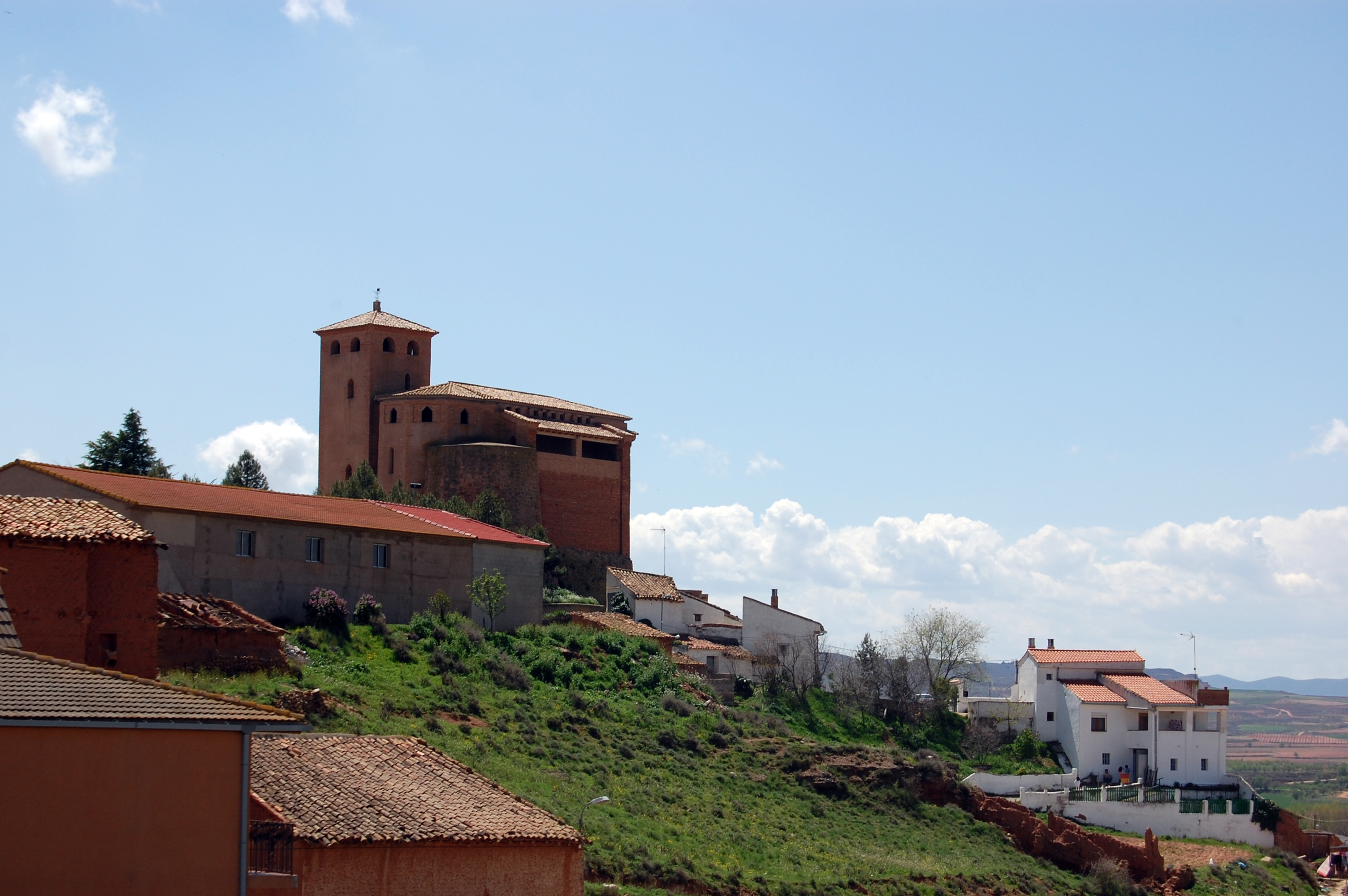

- Location within Aragon Location within Spain Location within Europe
- Country: Spain
- Autonomous community: Aragon
- Province: Zaragoza
- Municipality: Cervera de la Cañada

Area
  - Total: 29 km^{2} (11 sq mi)

Population (2025-01-01)
  - Total: 263
  - Density: 9.1/km^{2} (23/sq mi)
- Time zone: UTC+1 (CET)
  - Summer (DST): UTC+2 (CEST)

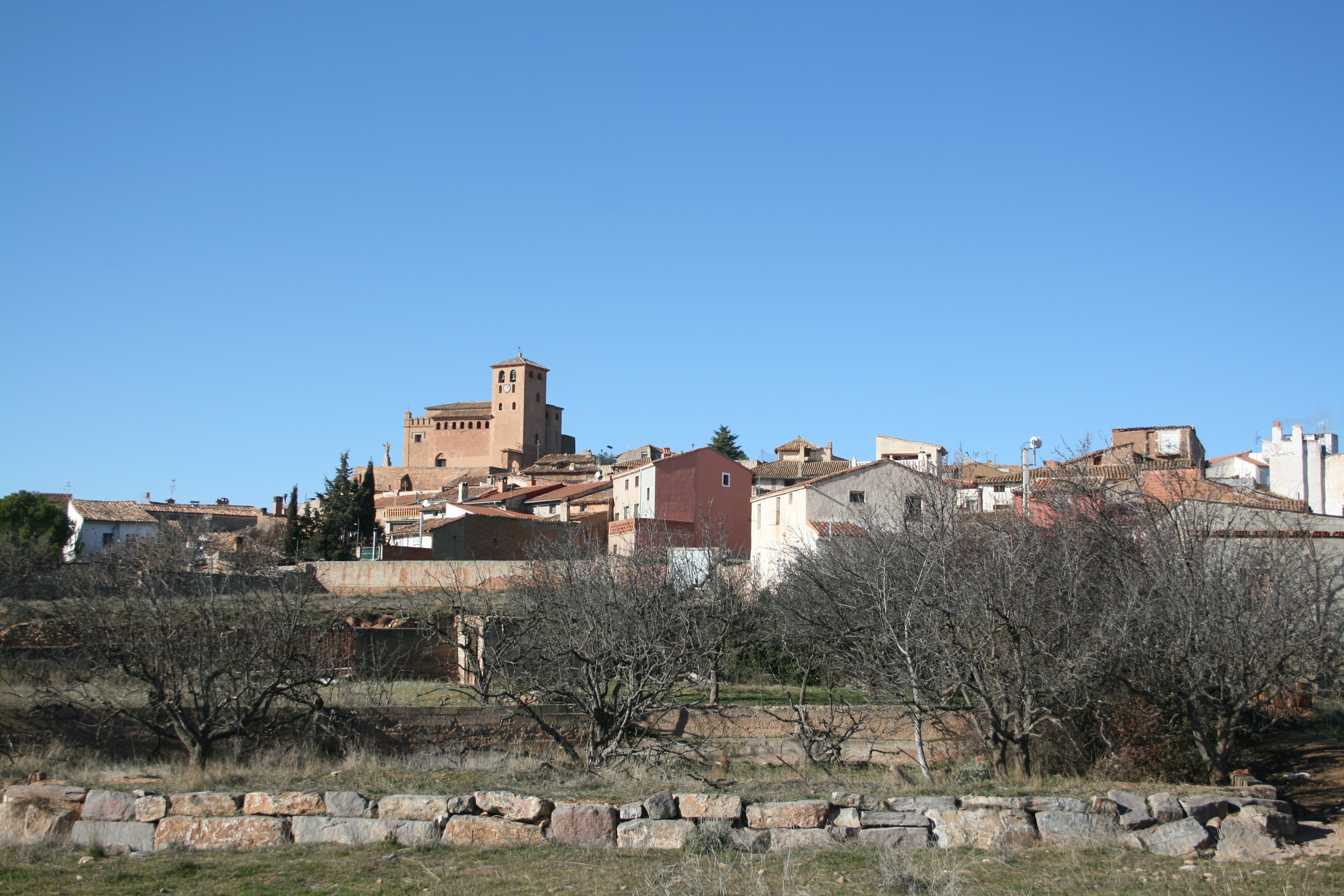
View of Cervera de la Cañada.

Cervera de la Cañada is a municipality located in the province of Zaragoza, Aragon, Spain. According to the 2011 census (INE), the municipality has a population of 319 inhabitants.

The church of Santa Tecla in Cervera is in the list of World Heritage Sites of (UNESCO) since 2001.

== See also ==
- List of municipalities in Zaragoza
