= Teruel =

City in Aragon, Spain

- Municipality
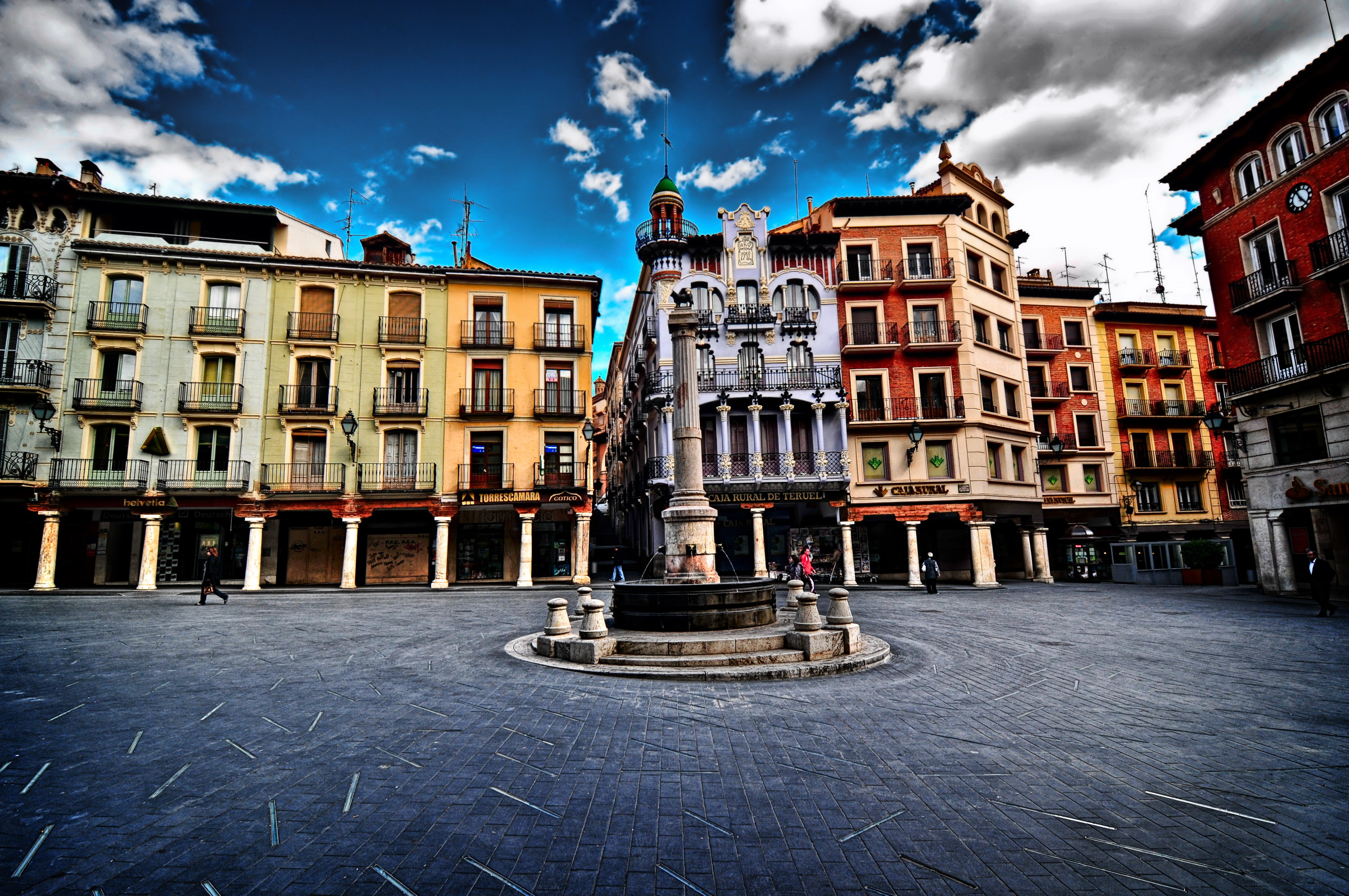
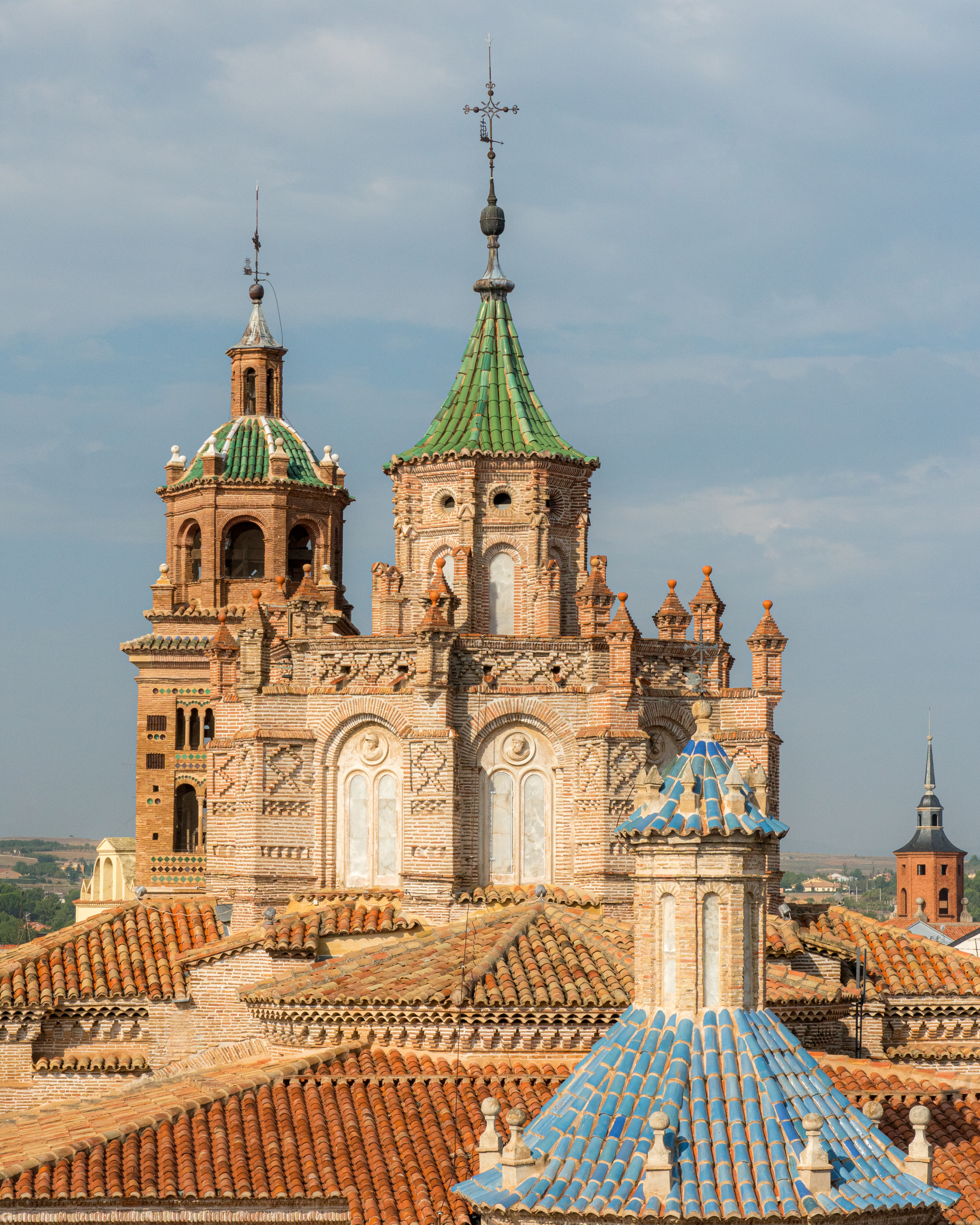
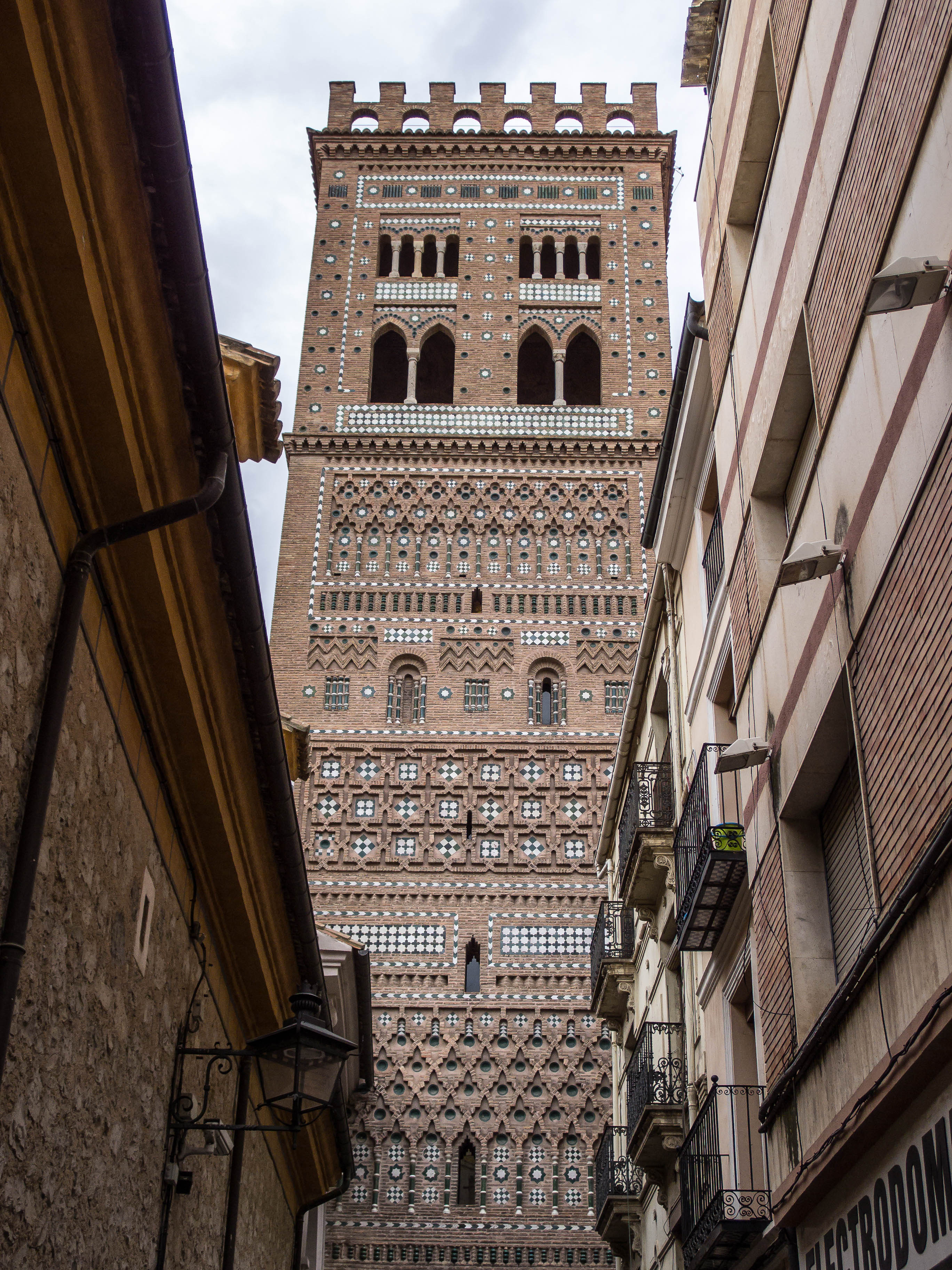
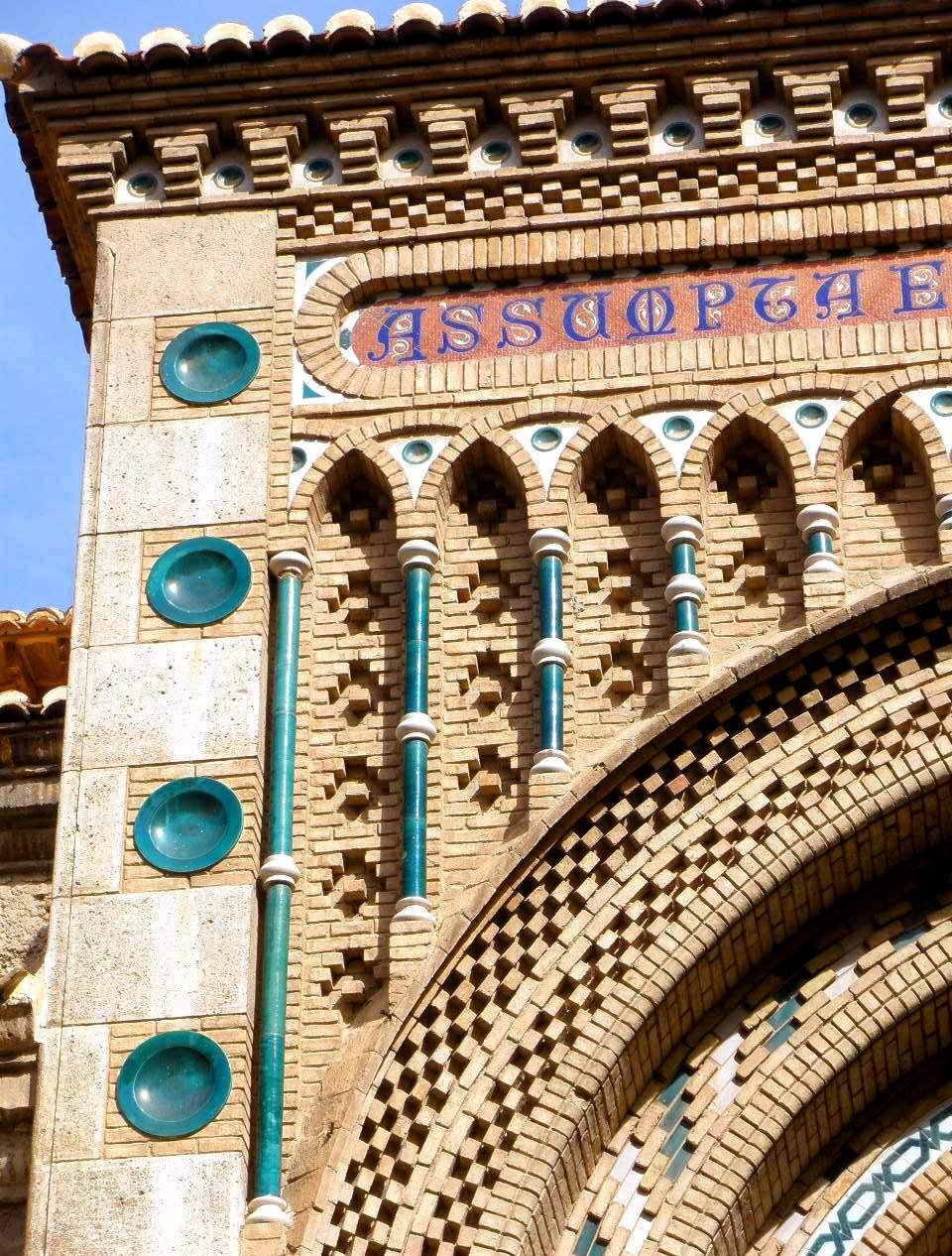
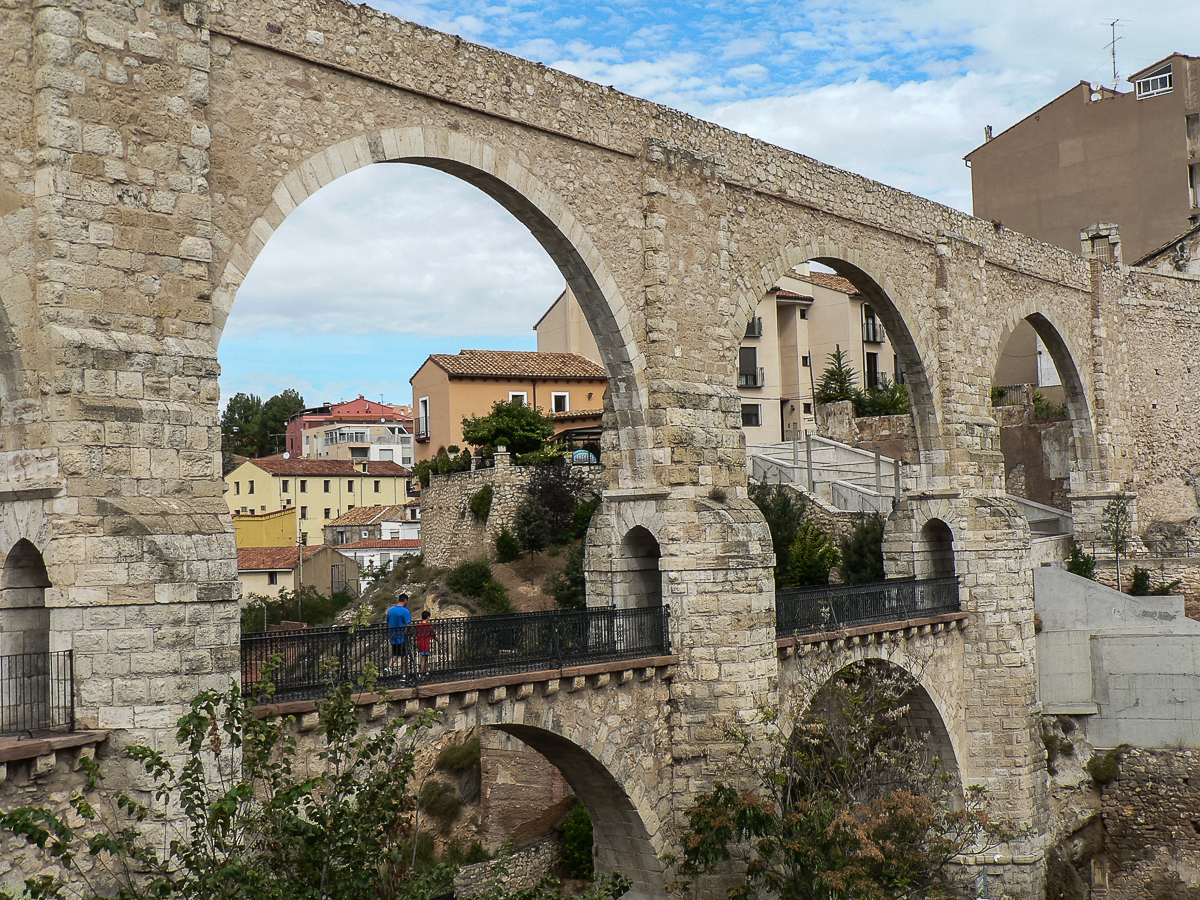
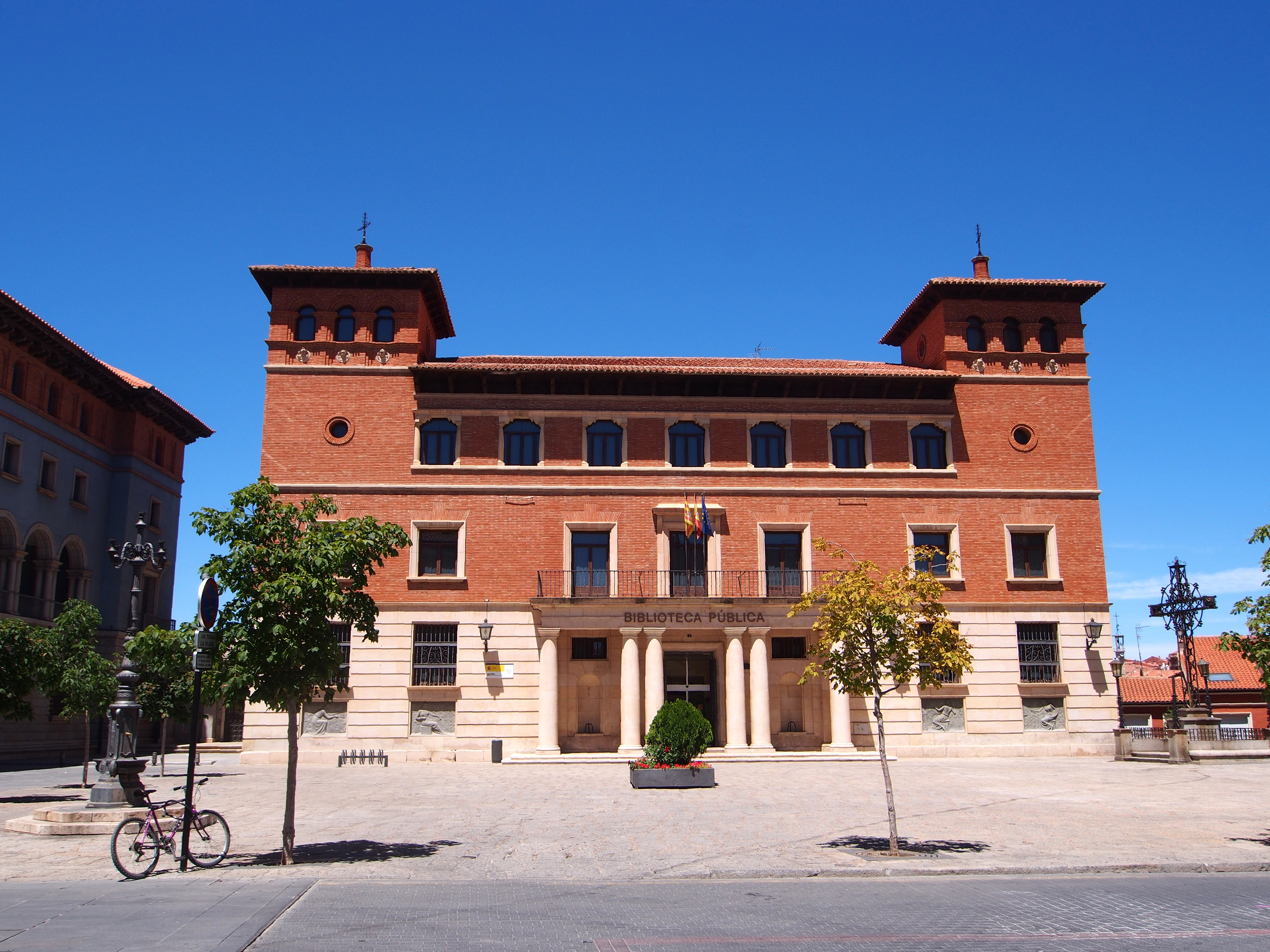
- El Torico square Cathedral El Salvador tower Mudéjar detail Los Arcos aqueduct Public Library

- Flag Coat of arms
- Location of Teruel
- Location in Aragon and in Spain Teruel (Spain)
- Coordinates: 40°20′37″N 1°6′26″W
- Country: Spain
- Autonomous community: Aragón
- Province: Teruel
- Comarca: Comunidad de Teruel
- Judicial district: Teruel
- Founded: 1171

Government
  - Alcalde: Emma Buj (Partido Popular de Aragón)

Area
  - Total: 440.41 km^{2} (170.04 sq mi)
- Elevation: 915 m (3,002 ft)

Population (2025-01-01)
  - Total: 36,655
  - Density: 83.229/km^{2} (215.56/sq mi)
- Demonym: Turolense
- Time zone: UTC+1 (CET)
  - Summer (DST): UTC+2 (CEST)
- Postal code: 44001 - 44003
- Dialing code: 978
- Official language(s): Spanish
- Website: Official website

Teruel (Spanish: [teˈɾwel]) is a city in Aragon, located in eastern Spain, and is also the capital of Teruel Province. It had a population of 35,900 as of 2022, making it the least populated provincial capital in Spain. It is noted for its harsh climate (with a wide daily variation on temperatures), its renowned jamón serrano (cured ham), its pottery, its surrounding archaeological sites, rock outcrops containing some of the oldest dinosaur remains of the Iberian Peninsula, and its famous events: La Vaquilla del Ángel during the weekend (Friday to Monday) closest to 10 July and "Bodas de Isabel de Segura" around the third weekend of February.

Teruel is regarded as the "town of Mudéjar" (Moorish-influenced architecture) due to numerous buildings designed in this style. All of them are comprised in the Mudéjar Architecture of Aragon which is a World Heritage Site by the UNESCO.

Teruel's remote and mountainous location 915 metres (3,002 feet) above sea level and its low population has led to relative isolation within Spain. A campaign group with the slogan Teruel existe ("Teruel exists") was founded in 1999 to press for greater recognition and investment in the town and the province. Due in part to the campaign, transport connections to Teruel were improved with the construction of a motorway between Zaragoza and Sagunto. However, Teruel remains the only provincial capital in peninsular Spain without a direct road or railway link to the national capital, Madrid. A running joke in the Spanish online satirical publication El Mundo Today is that Teruel does not exist.

== History ==
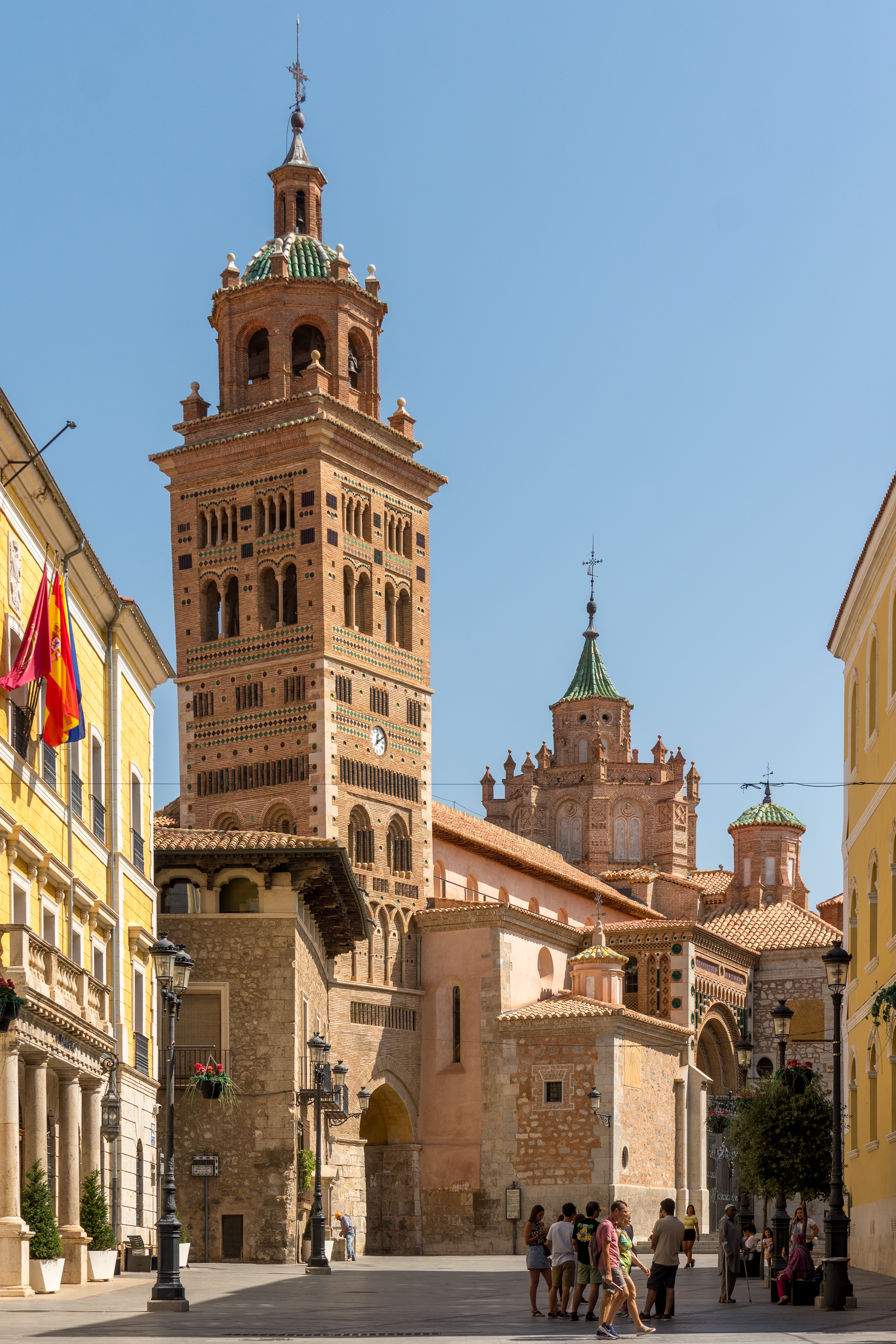
View of the Mudéjar Cathedral

The area around Teruel has been populated since the times of the Celtiberians, who called it Turboleta. The place-name Turboleta could come from the Basque-Iberian term itur + olu + eta (place of the water source, spring), according to the theory of Basque-Iberism. The area was later occupied by the Romans, who left remains in nearby towns, such as Cella.

Some authors claim that in the location of the current city of Teruel (specifically its Jewish quarter) was originally called Tirwal, a name that would have come from the Arabic word meaning "tower." A Muslim enclave is said to have existed in that location in the year 935. However, the corresponding archaeological sites found there belong to a defensive structure, not a population center.

On 1 October 1171, King Alfonso II captured Tirwal. He was threatened by the Almohads’ capture of Valencia, and wanted to strengthen the southern border of his kingdom. In the same year, he founded the city of Teruel, granting it fueros and privileges to facilitate the repopulation of the area.

The foundation of Teruel marked an unprecedented change in the political and territorial structure of southern Aragon. The predominance of Albarracín and Alfambra during the Muslim era was replaced by that of the newly-founded cities, Teruel in particular, to the detriment of Alfambra, which would remain in the background under the organizing principle of manorialism.

According to one legend, Teruel was founded when all the wise and important people of the town came together to look for signs and omens. The omen they found favorable was a bull, mooing from atop a high place with a star shining on it from above. The high place where they found the bull was eventually made into the town’s main square. According to some authors, the name of the city has its origins in this meeting, since the combination of the words “bull” (toro) and the name of the star, "Actuel," would make "Toroel," which could become "Toruel." The legend of this encounter also explains the star and bull on the city’s flag and coat of arms.

The inhabitants of Teruel intervened in the conquest of Valencia, which had been in the hands of the Muslims, and in the War of the Two Peters against the Kingdom of Castile. The population was granted the title of city in 1347 by Pedro IV of Aragon for their support in the Battle of Épila. In the Middle Ages, the Jewish and Mudejar communities attained considerable importance within the social and economic life of the city, since their aljamas were consolidated towards the end of the 13th century.

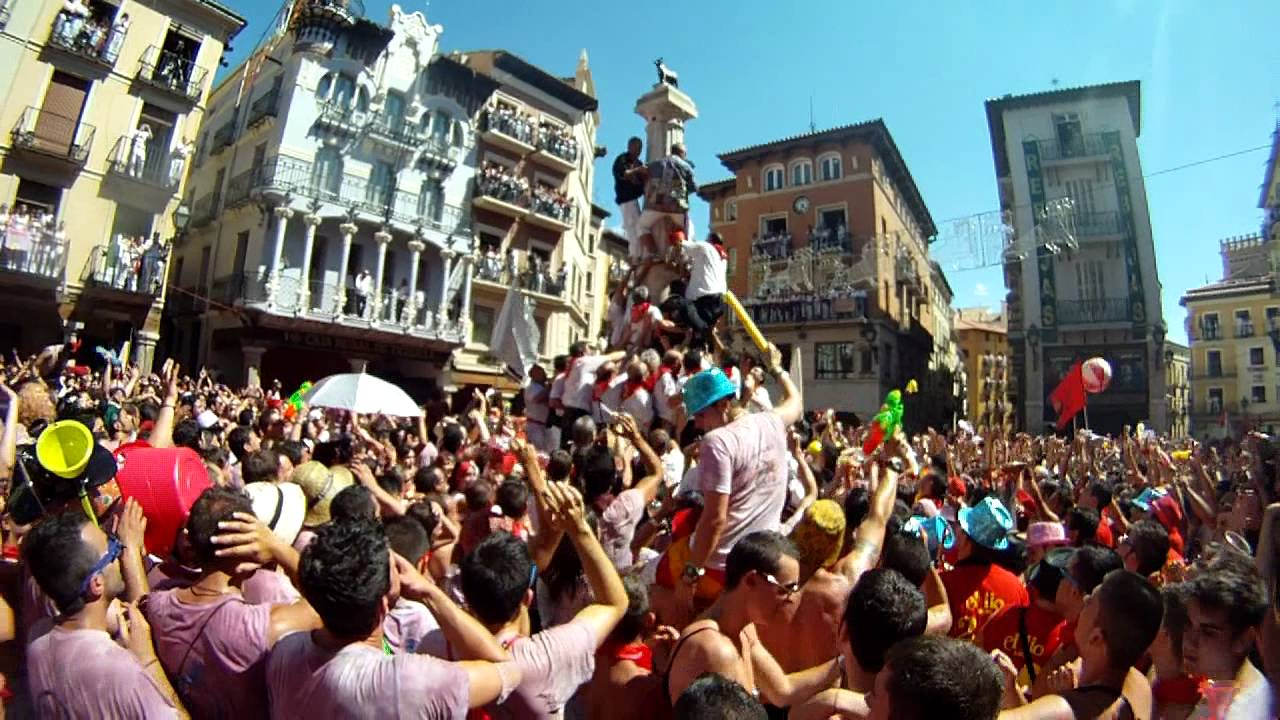
La Vaquilla del Ángel

The Jewish Quarter of Teruel still preserves its name, and many archaeological sites have been found there. In the Middle Ages, Teruel possessed a prominent Jewish community, which was robust during the centuries Muslims were in power and enjoyed several privileges. Later on after the Christian reconquest of Spain, the Jewish community paid a yearly tax of 300 sueldos (in the 14th century). Its members were engaged in commerce and industry, especially in wool-weaving. During the persecutions of 1391 many of them were killed, while others accepted Christianity in order to save their lives.

Teruel was fought over in the Spanish Civil War, and much of the city was destroyed. The Battle of Teruel in December 1937–February 1938, was one of the bloodiest of the war. The town changed hands several times, first falling to the Republicans and eventually being re-taken by the Nationalists. In the course of the fighting, Teruel was subjected to heavy artillery and aerial bombardment. The two sides suffered up to 140,000 casualties between them in the three-month battle. The Nationalists won a decisive victory.

== Climate ==
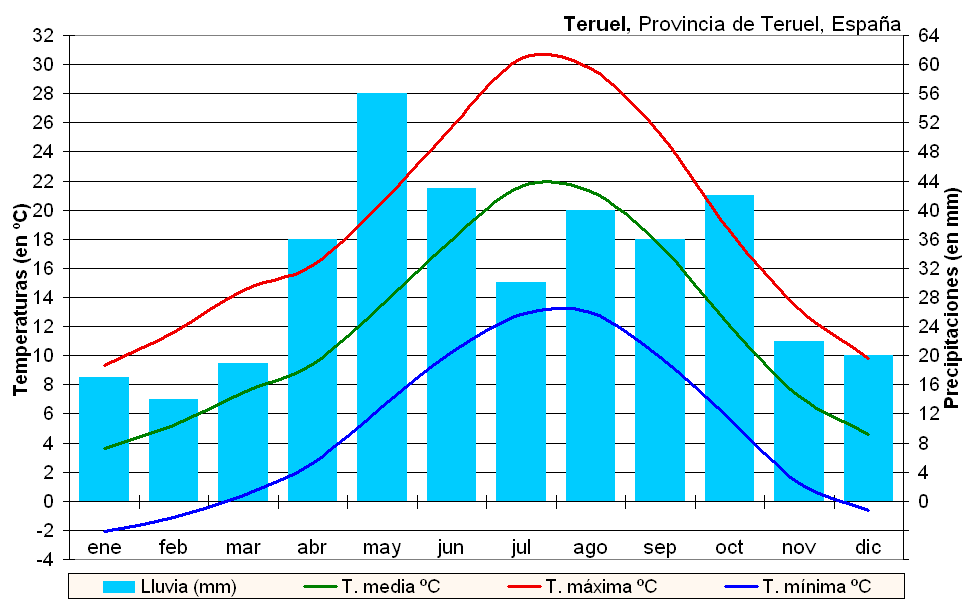
Climograph of Teruel.

According to the Köppen climate classification, Teruel has a cold semi-arid climate (BSk). Summer temperatures are warm to hot, although there is much daily variation, and winters are cold, with low minimum temperatures sometimes dropping to −10 °C (14.0 °F). The lowest amount of rainfall is in winter and the highest in late spring and mid autumn.

The temperature records registered at the Observatory of Teruel were 41.3 °C (106.3 °F) on August 14, 2021 and −21 °C (−5.8 °F) on January 12, 2021.

Climate data for Teruel 918m (1991-2020), extremes (1986-present)
Month	Jan	Feb	Mar	Apr	May	Jun	Jul	Aug	Sep	Oct	Nov	Dec	Year
Record high °C (°F)	22.9 (73.2)	24.8 (76.6)	28.2 (82.8)	32.9 (91.2)	35.8 (96.4)	38.8 (101.8)	40.6 (105.1)	41.3 (106.3)	36.7 (98.1)	33.2 (91.8)	26.3 (79.3)	21.2 (70.2)	41.3 (106.3)
Mean daily maximum °C (°F)	10.1 (50.2)	12.0 (53.6)	15.6 (60.1)	17.9 (64.2)	22.4 (72.3)	27.8 (82.0)	31.9 (89.4)	31.3 (88.3)	25.7 (78.3)	20.1 (68.2)	13.8 (56.8)	10.5 (50.9)	19.9 (67.9)
Daily mean °C (°F)	4.0 (39.2)	5.2 (41.4)	8.3 (46.9)	10.7 (51.3)	14.7 (58.5)	19.3 (66.7)	22.7 (72.9)	22.5 (72.5)	17.9 (64.2)	13.1 (55.6)	7.6 (45.7)	4.6 (40.3)	12.5 (54.6)
Mean daily minimum °C (°F)	−2.2 (28.0)	−1.6 (29.1)	0.9 (33.6)	3.3 (37.9)	7.0 (44.6)	10.8 (51.4)	13.4 (56.1)	13.6 (56.5)	10.1 (50.2)	6.1 (43.0)	1.3 (34.3)	−1.4 (29.5)	5.1 (41.2)
Record low °C (°F)	−21.0 (−5.8)	−12.8 (9.0)	−10.6 (12.9)	−5.3 (22.5)	−2.7 (27.1)	0.7 (33.3)	4.6 (40.3)	3.0 (37.4)	−0.4 (31.3)	−4.0 (24.8)	−12.2 (10.0)	−19.0 (−2.2)	−21.0 (−5.8)
Average precipitation mm (inches)	16.0 (0.63)	14.0 (0.55)	26.7 (1.05)	39.7 (1.56)	49.5 (1.95)	43.1 (1.70)	23.9 (0.94)	32.8 (1.29)	33.1 (1.30)	38.8 (1.53)	26.7 (1.05)	15.8 (0.62)	360.1 (14.17)
Average precipitation days (≥ 1 mm)	3.3	2.8	4.4	5.9	6.9	5.4	3.0	3.8	4.7	5.3	4.7	3.9	54.1
Average snowy days	2.3	2.8	1.8	1.0	0.2	0	0	0	0	0.1	0.9	1.4	10.5
Average relative humidity (%)	74	67	62	60	58	53	49	54	61	68	73	76	63
Mean monthly sunshine hours	149	170	211	231	267	300	344	310	243	189	141	130	2,685
Source: Agencia Estatal de Meteorología

== Main sights ==
The beauty of the town's cultural inheritance, which has some Islamic influence, has been recognised by UNESCO, which includes four churches in the World Heritage Site Mudéjar Architecture of Aragon, notably the town's ornate cathedral in the Mudéjar style.

One of Teruel's best known monuments is very small statue of a bull on top of a tall column, known as El Torico ("the little bull"). It is located in the main square, Plaza Carlos Castell, more commonly known as the Plaza del Torico in the middle of the town center.

Other sights include:

- Torre de El Salvador (14th century), in mudéjar style
- Cathedral: Catedral de Santa María de Teruel, in mudéjar style
- San Pedro, a mudéjar church (16th century) with a tower similar to that of the cathedral. It includes a mausoleum, Mausoleo de Los Amantes, housing the mummified bodies of Isabel de Segura (a wealthy woman) and Diego de Marcilla (a poor man who battled at Crusades to earn some money with the intention to return to get married with Isabel) whose love ended tragically. This story is known as los amantes de Teruel and has inspired writers (for example Hartzenbusch) and an opera composed by Tomás Bretón.
- Church of La Merced, with a bell tower in mudéjar style (the upper sector added later in Baroque style).
- Church of San Salvador (17th century), with one of the most outstanding mudéjar towers. It houses a 14th-century wooden sculpture of Christ.
- Church of San Martín (17th century).
- Torre de San Martín (14th century), in mudéjar style
- Church of San Miguel (12th century), remade in the 17th century in Baroque style.
- Castillo de Alambes, a 15th-century fortification built over the Arabic Alcazar.
- Casa El Torico, Casa Ferrán and Casa La Madrileña, 1910s liberty style houses
- Palace of the Marquis of Tosos (17th century)
- The Gothic church of St. Francis (1391–1492). It has a single nave with chapels covered by a ribbed vault with no crossing.
- Los Arcos, an aqueduct with two orders of arcade from 1538.

On the outskirts of Teruel is Dinópolis Teruel, a combined theme park and museum centred on dinosaurs. Promoted as a paleontological park, it includes a life-size robotic model of a Tyrannosaurus rex. Dinópolis also owns three other museums in the surrounding area, which display the remains of dinosaurs discovered in the region. The chimney of the Teruel Power Plant is one of the tallest freestanding structures in Western Europe.

Sights of Teruel

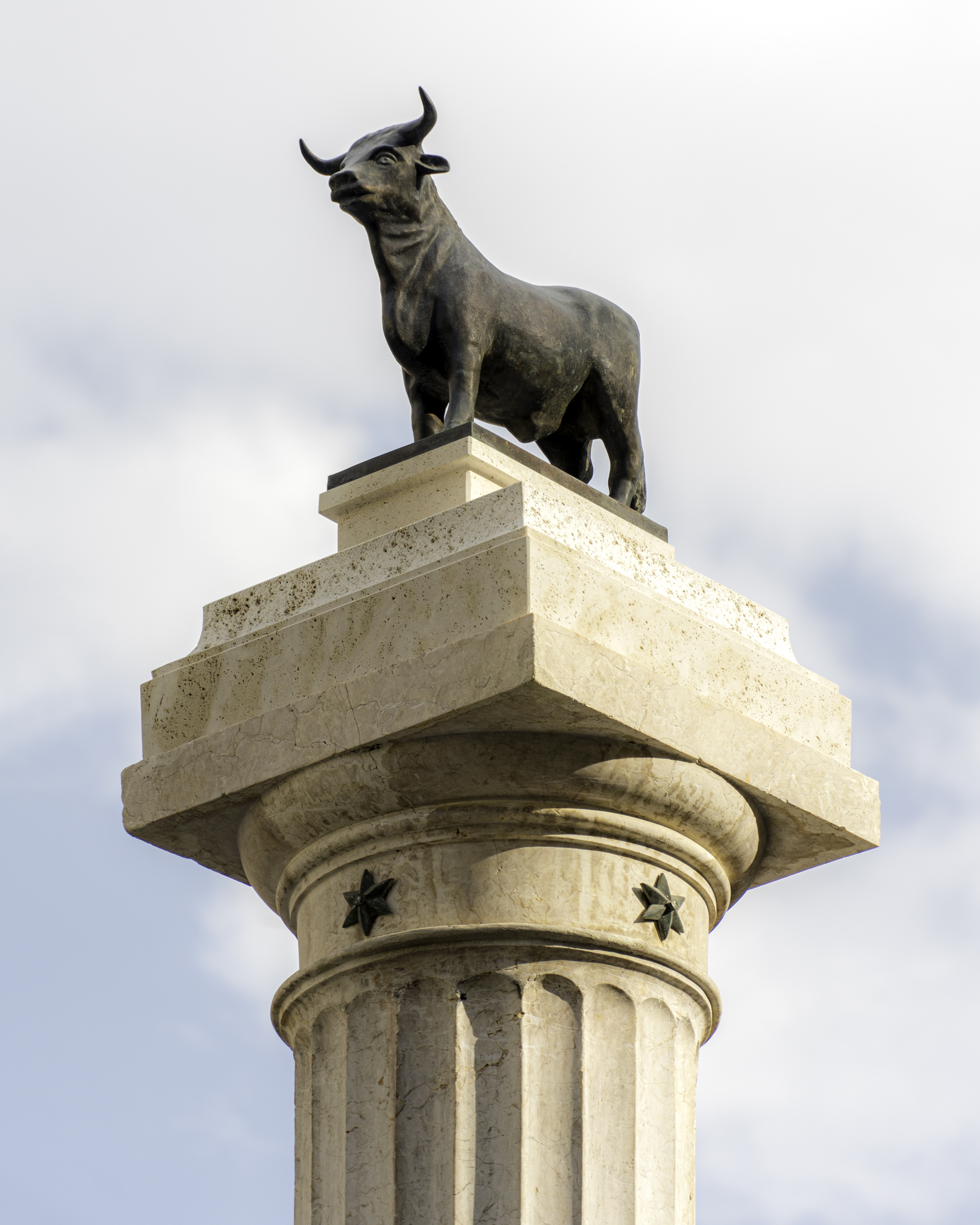
El Torico Fountain

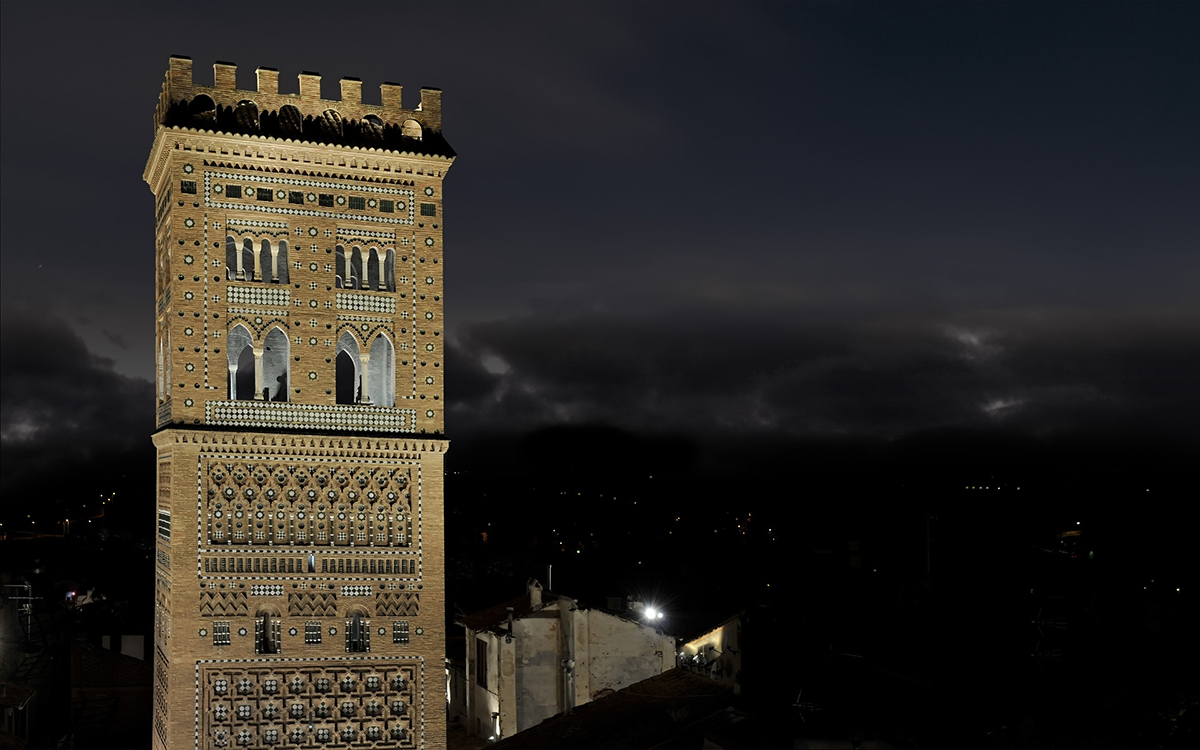
Mudéjar Tower of El Salvador (14th century)

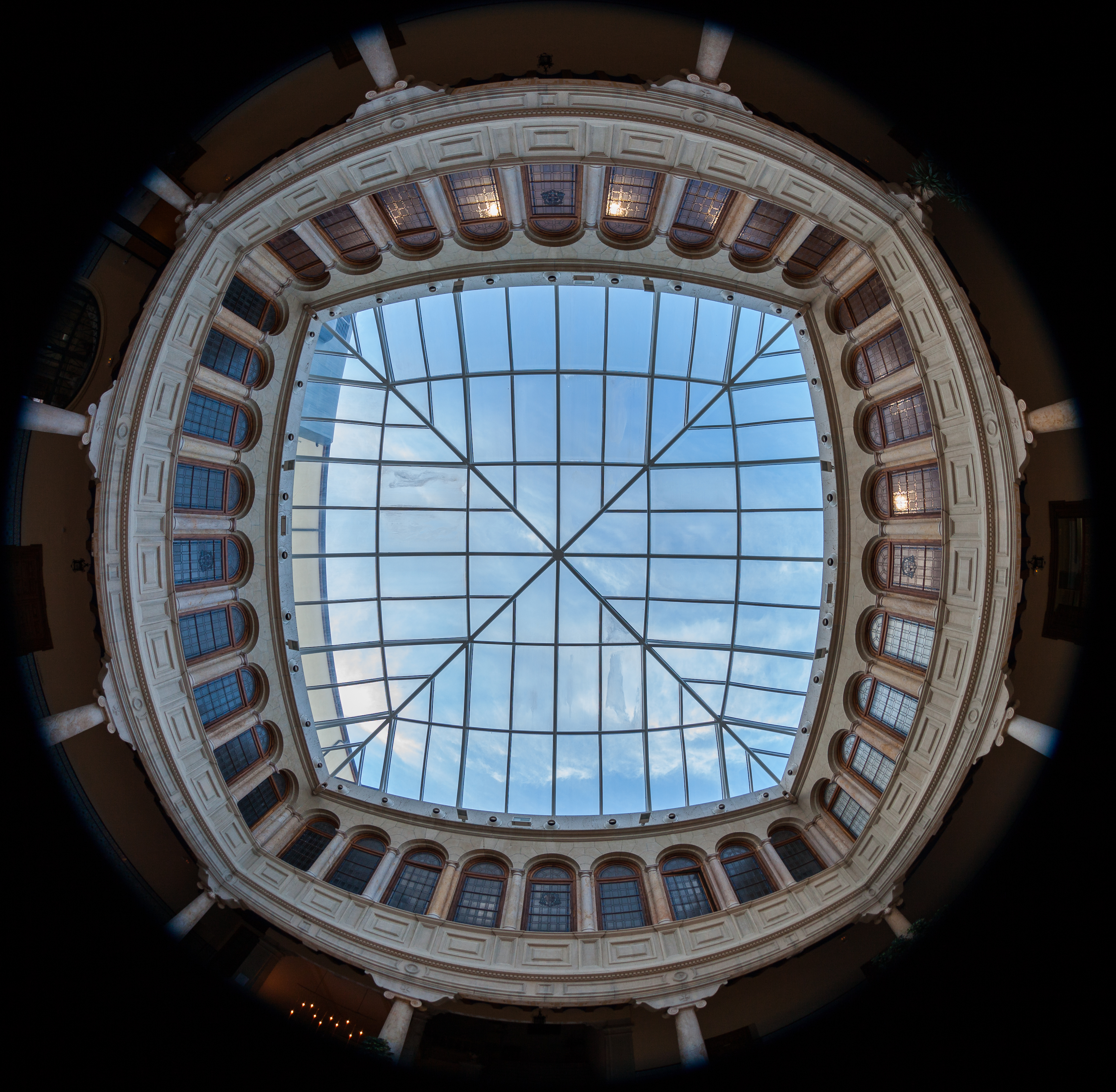
Glass roof of the museum of religious art in Teruel

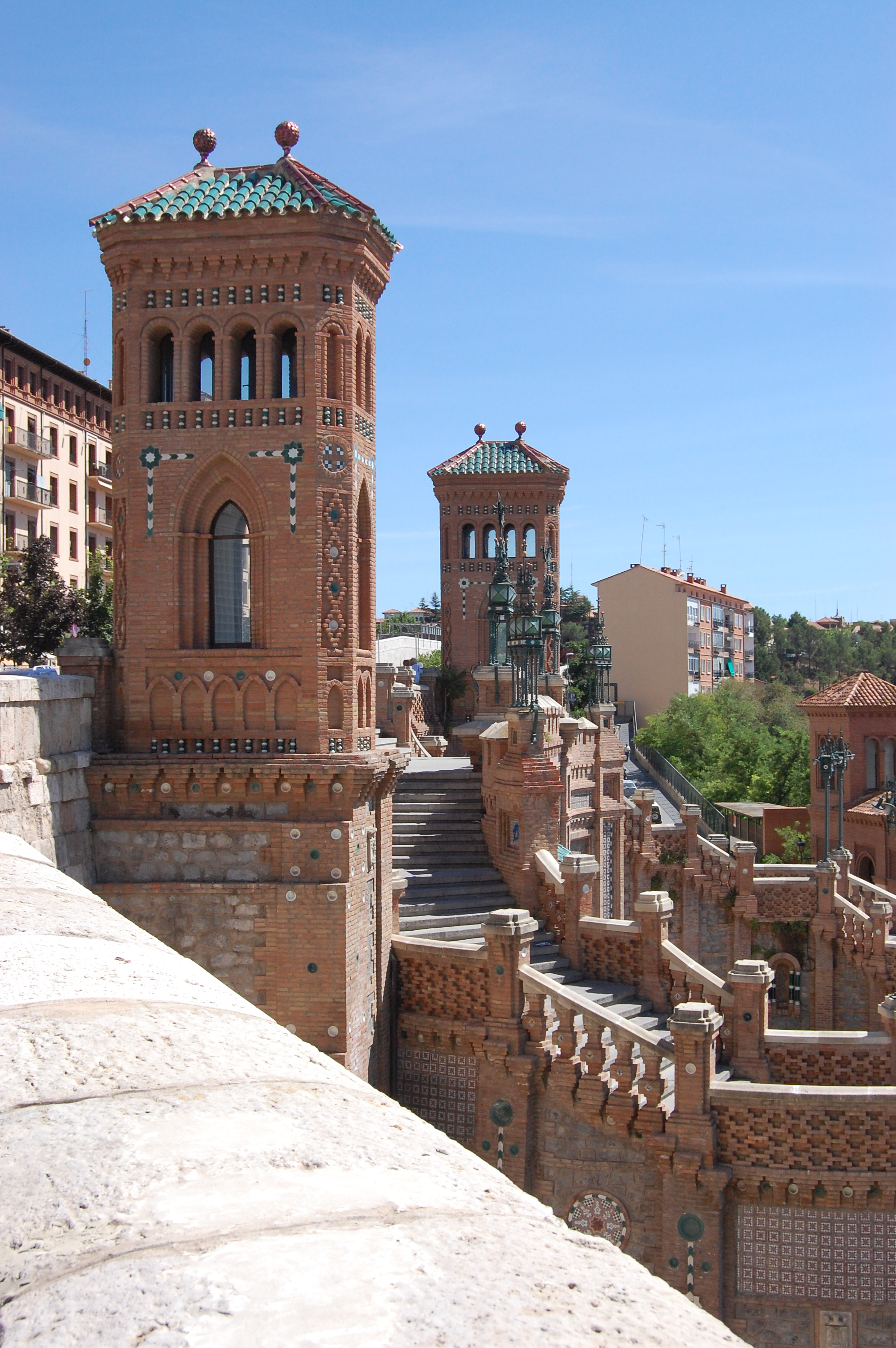
La Escalinata

== Education and research ==
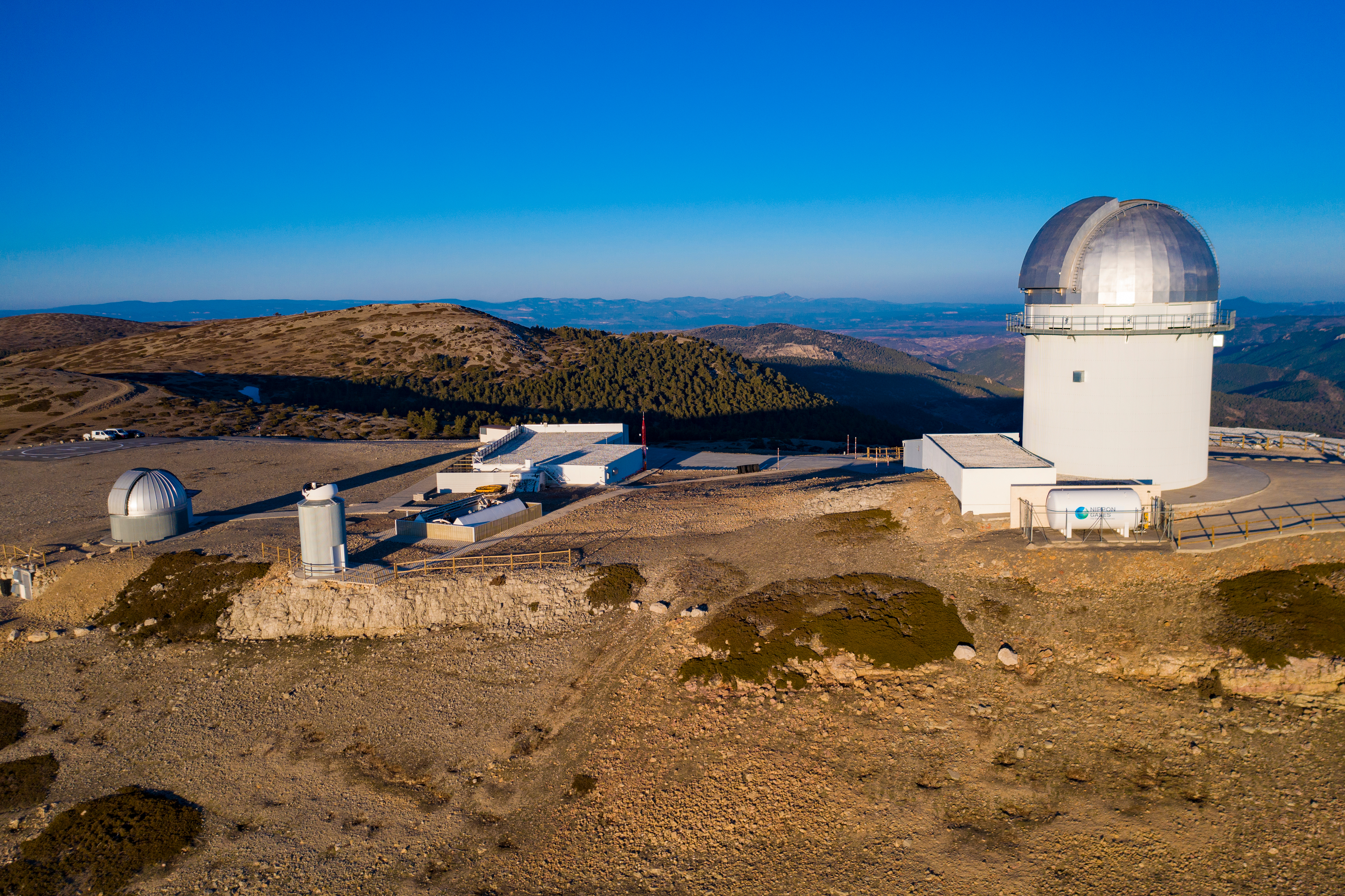
Astrophysical Observatory of Javalambre located in the Teruel province and operated by CEFCA in Teruel.

A branch of the University of Zaragoza is located in Teruel. The Aragon Center for Physics of the Cosmos (CEFCA in Spanish), which conducts research in astrophysics and cosmology is also located in Teruel. CEFCA operates the Astrophysical Observatory of Javalambre (OAJ), which is located in the south of the Teruel province and recognized as a national Unique Scientific and Technical Infrastructure.

== Transportation ==
Teruel Airport opened in 2013, after being repurposed from an original military airbase; it is primarily an aircraft storage and maintenance facility, with no passenger traffic. The nearest passenger airport is Valencia Airport, which is located 157 km (98 mi) south east of Teruel.

== Sport ==
The 3rd Stage of The 2024 La Vuelta Femenina finished at Teruel on April 30. It was won by Marianne Vos.

== Notable people ==
- Alba Bautista (born 2002), rhythmic gymnast and world bronze medalist
- David Civera (born 1979), singer
- Manuel Macías y Casado (1844–1937), general and military governor
- Luis Milla (born 1966), association football player and manager
- Javier Sierra (born 1971), journalist and writer
- Juan Gabriel of Teruel, 16th-century Spanish translator known for translating the Quran into Latin

== See also ==
- La Vaquilla del Ángel
- Diocese of Teruel and Albarracín.
- Lovers of Teruel
- Battle of Teruel
- List of municipalities in Teruel
