= Torre de San Martín =

Mediveal Structure from the Early 14th Century in Aragon, Spain

Coordinates: 40°20′39″N 1°06′34″W

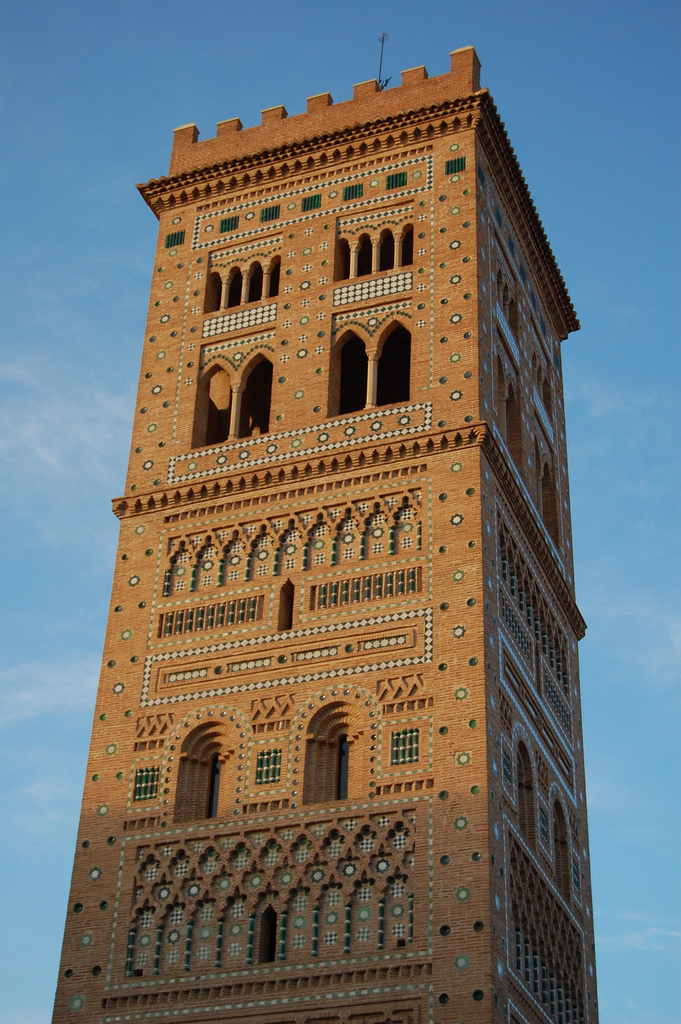
View of the tower.

The Torre de San Martín (English: St. Martin's Tower) is a medieval structure in Teruel, Aragon, northern Spain. Built in Aragonese Mudéjar style in 1316 and renovated in the 16th century, it was added to the UNESCO Heritage List in 1986 together with other Mudéjar structures in Teruel.

The tower was built between in 1315 and 1316. In 1550 its lower section was restored due to the erosion caused by humidity. Like other structures in Teruel, it is a gate-tower decorated with ceramic glaze. The road passes through an ogival arch. The tower takes its names from the annexed church of St. Martin, dating to the Baroque period.

The tower follows the scheme of the Almohad minarets, with two concentric square towers between which are the stairs. The inner tower has three floors covered with cross vaults.

== See also ==
- Mudéjar Architecture of Aragon
