= Gaspar de Bracamonte, 3rd Count of Peñaranda =

Spanish diplomat and statesman

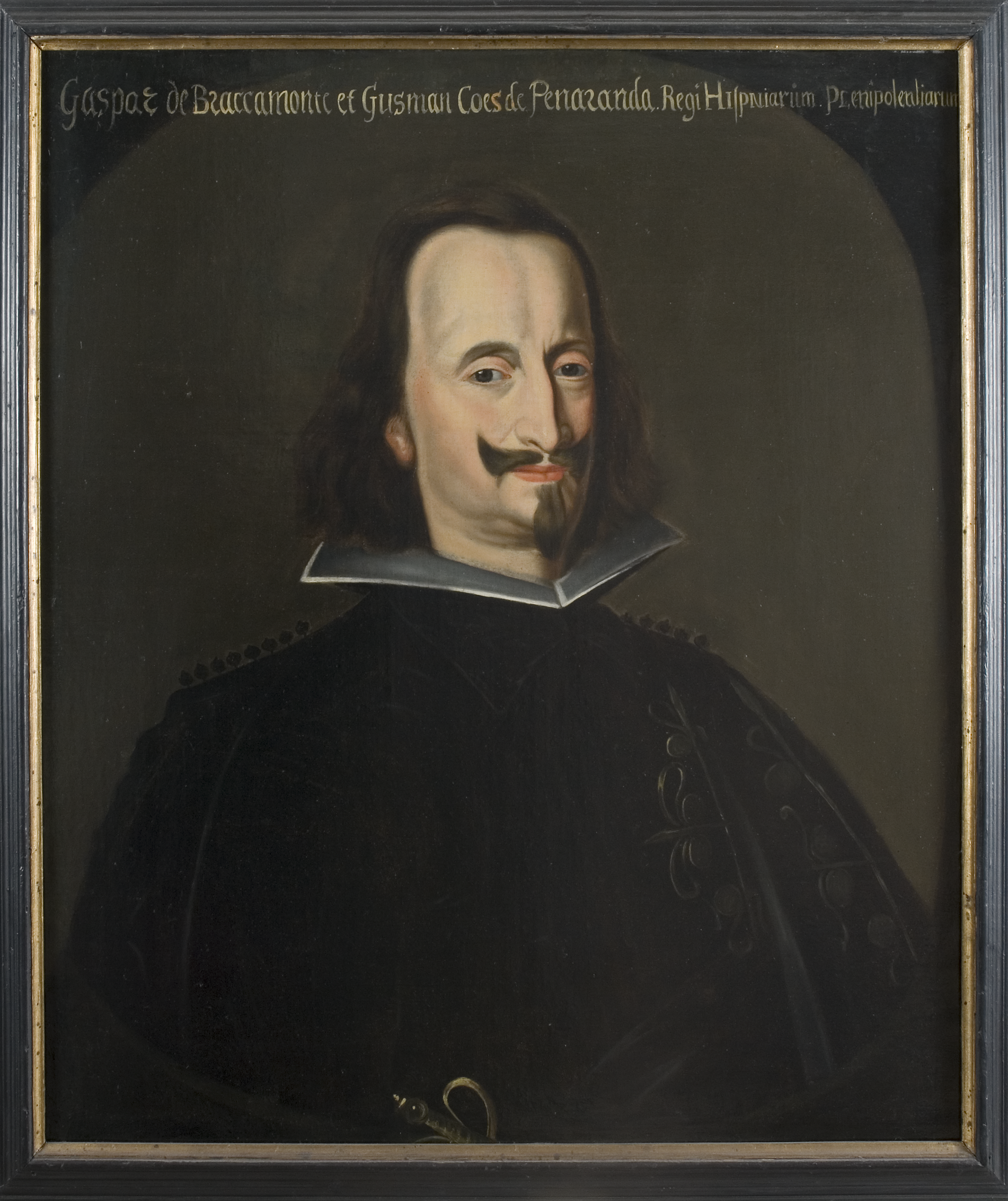
Portrait of Gaspar de Bracamonte, 3rd Count of Peñaranda.

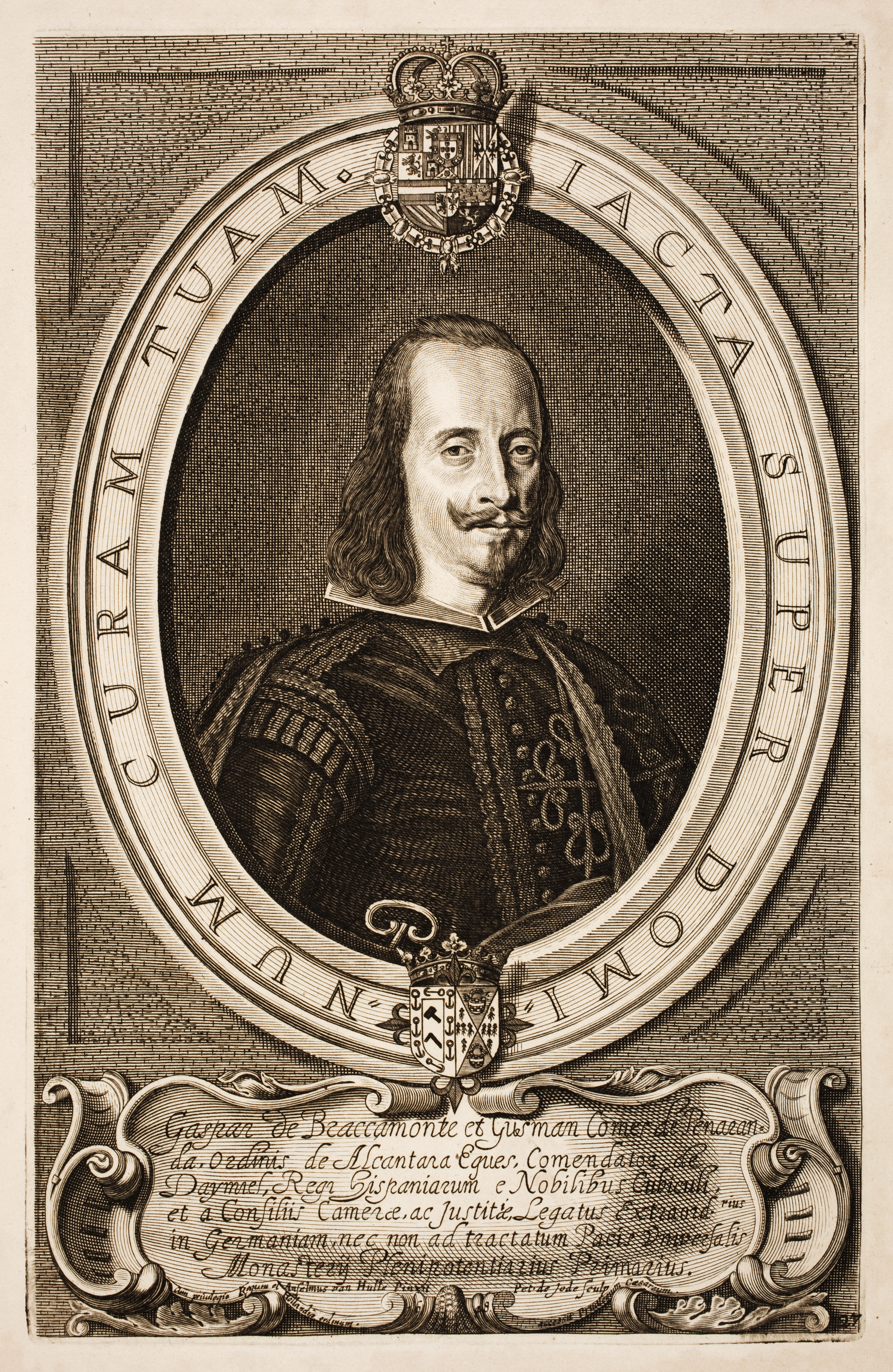
Gaspar de Bracamonte at the Peace of Westphalia, engraving after Anselm van Hulle.

Gaspar de Bracamonte y Guzmán, 3rd Count of Peñaranda (Spanish: Gaspar de Bracamonte y Guzmán, tercer Conde de Peñaranda) (c. 1595 – 14 December 1676) was a Spanish diplomat and statesman.

== Life ==
Bracamonte was born in Peñaranda de Bracamonte, Spain, in 1595. He was the fifth son of Alonso de Bracamonte, 1st Count of Peñaranda and the Spanish prince instructor. He married his niece María de Bracamonte, daughter of his older brother Balthazar Emmanuel, and 3rd Countess of Peñaranda. They had one son, Gregorio, 4th Count of Peñaranda, who died without legitimate heirs in 1689.

Bracamonte led the Spanish delegation at the Peace of Münster and the Peace of Westphalia in 1648, representing Philip IV. These treaties ended the Eighty Years' War with the Dutch Republic and the Thirty Years' War in Germany, but not the War with France which would continue until 1659.
Don Gaspar returned to Spain in September 1650. In February 1651 the King appointed him president of the Council of the Orders. In October 1653 he granted him also the presidency of the Council of the Indies, with retention of that of the Council of the Orders.

From 1659 to 1664 he was Spanish Viceroy of Naples and after death king Philip IV, one of the regents of the Kingdom of Spain. After the King's death in 1665, he returned to Spain and became an advisor of the King's widow, Mariana of Austria, who took over the regency for her infant son Charles.
He negotiated and signed two treaties with England : the Treaty of Madrid (1667) with the Earl of Sandwich regarding the Portuguese Restoration War and the Treaty of Madrid (1670) with William Godolphin for the settlement of all disputes in the America's.

In 1671, he became president of the Council of Italy.
Bracamonte died in Madrid, Spain, on 14 December 1676.

Spanish nobility
Preceded by Baltazar de Bracamonte	Count-consort of Peñaranda ?–1676	Succeeded by Gregorio de Bracamonte
Government offices
Preceded by García de Haro-Sotomayor	Viceroy of Naples; 1659–1664	Succeeded by Pascual de Aragón
