= Siege of Lille (1667) =

Episode of the war of Devolution

Coordinates: 50°37′45.3″N 3°3′26.12″E

- Part of the War of Devolution
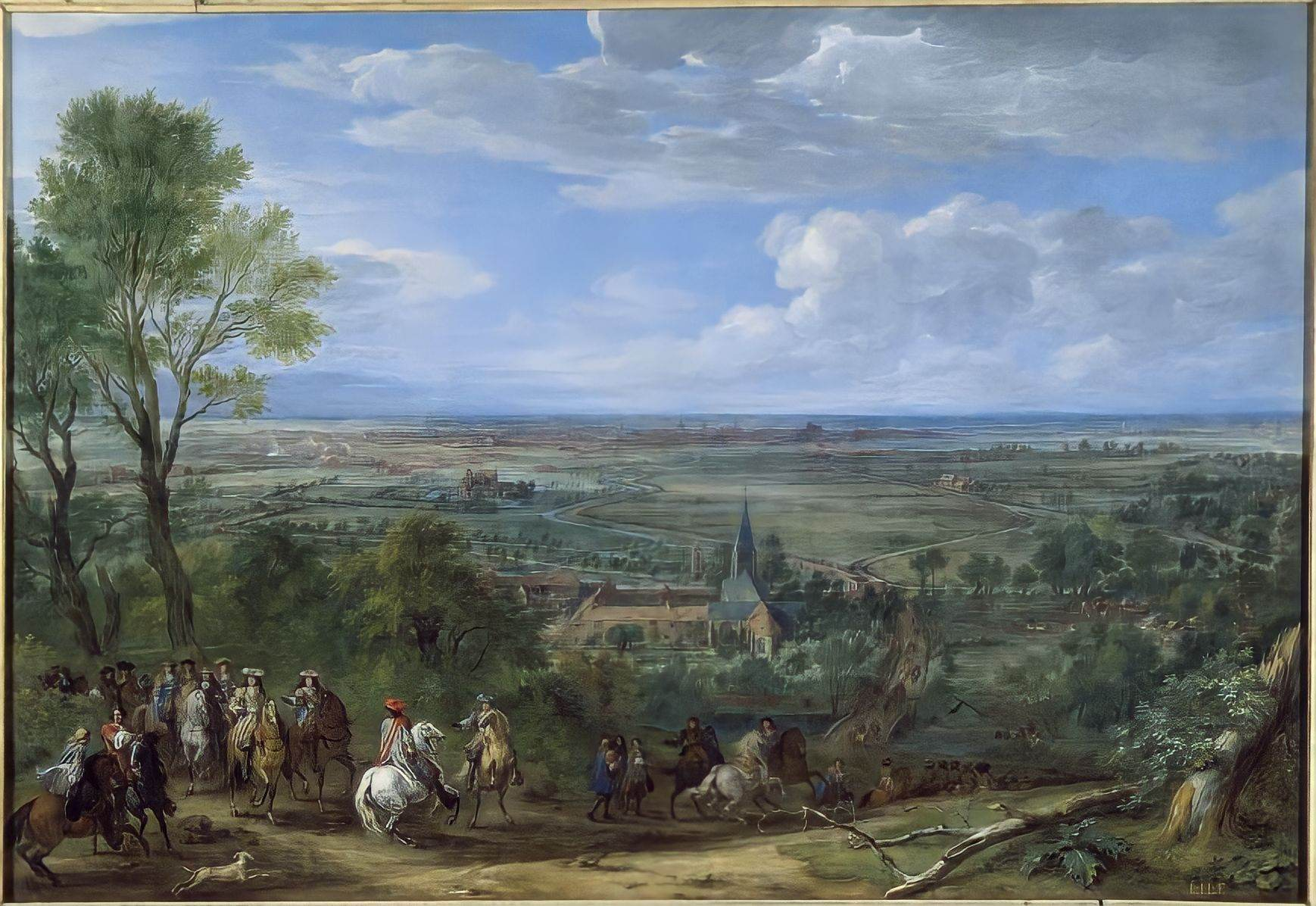
- Louis XIV at Lille
Date	28 August – 26 September 1667
Location	Lille, France
Result	French victory

Belligerents
Kingdom of France	Spain

Commanders and leaders
Louis XIV; Turenne (army commander); Vauban (siege commander)	Comte de Bruay

Strength
Unknown	Siege: 4,200 garrison Relief operation: 8,000–12,000

Casualties and losses
Siege: Unknown Relief operation: Very light	Siege: Unknown Relief operation: 2,000 killed or wounded 1,500 captured

The siege of Lille took place during the War of Devolution. Louis XIV's forces besieged Lille from 28 August to 26 September 1667. It was the only major engagement of the war. Lille was the first major victory for Vauban’s siege techniques. Louis XIV, arguing that the Spanish dowry of his wife Maria Theresa of Spain had not been paid, began to expand French borders to the north and east, invading the Spanish Netherlands. This began a conflict with Spain that became the War of Devolution. After taking Charleroi, Tournai, and Douai, French troops laid siege to Lille, at that time part of the county of Flanders under Spanish rule. Siege techniques applied by the French military engineer Vauban were instrumental in their capture.

== Background ==
After the capture of Lille in 1304 by Philip IV the Fair, Lille, Douai and Bethune remained in the possession of Flanders, but had to pay an annual rent to France. Louis XIV was intent on the final incorporation of Lille into France. On 2 May 1667, Philippe Spinola, comte de Bruay, the governor of the province, told the magistrate of Lille that it was necessary to increase the custody of Lille and rejuvenate its composition; increase military reserves, fix and enhance capacity; and organize the facilities for poor people. The magistrate fulfilled these requirements.

At this time, French troops laid siege to Armentieres and on 28 May took it. Bruges resigned between 6 and 12 June. The French king and the troops approached Hainault. On 16 June, he gave up Tours, Douai and Kurtre. Udenard also consistently capitulated. Louis XIV made a demonstrative attack on the Dendermonde and the Margrave Gyumer followed with a cavalry corps. On 10 August, the vanguard of the king came to Lille and immediately proceeded to the siege works.

The work was done on the eastern edge of the river Becquerel, at the Thebes gate to the bastion Nobltur. The king personally led the siege. On 11 August, Lunette located in front of the gate Thebes, was taken by storm. On the night of 19 August preparations were completed. The attack was carried out simultaneously on the right by the Guard against the gates of Thebes and on the left by Picardy Orleans shelves at Bastion Nobltur. On 21 August, the battery was finished. Their fire soon destroyed the battery door at Thebes, leading the defenders to build batteries on the bastions of St. Maurice and St. Mary Magdalene. In the latter was a famous battery Meunier that shelled longitudinal approaches to the position of the besieged. During this time, many fires were set. On 23 August, besiegers built 4-gun batteries against Becquerel.

The besieged had gunpowder only for 8–10 days, and the town bell began to light fires to signal the Spanish general Count Marzenu that the city was in danger. The response lights on the hills near Kemmel Iperna were supposed to mean the expulsion of aid, not light. French corps openly went on the attack and took possession of kontreskarpom Ravelin Thebes gate.

Over the next two days, the French intensified their fire and took the palisade. On 26 August, the besieged made a sortie and their cavalry raided the camp of the besiegers. The following night, when the besieged rested after the attacks, the French guard, supported by two companies of musketeers, quietly attacked, rushing the gates of Thebes at half moon and seized them. At the same time, the Auvergne Karamini mastered Ravelin Nobltur.

The attackers' losses were great, but the situation became critical. The magistrate asked the Bruhat to enter into negotiations with the king for an honorable surrender. Bruay gathered senior commanders who insisted on a counter-attack to retake both Ravelin, but the latter asked him to abandon this idea, as the troops were unprepared. Bruay entered into negotiations for the surrender of Lille on 28 August. The French king entered the city and took an oath to protect the city's privileges.

== Aftermath ==
According to the Treaty of Aix-la-Chapelle (1668), Lille was finally annexed to France. Louis XIV had Vauban, who received a scar during the siege when a bullet hit his cheek, refortify the town. In recognition of his achievements, Vauban was also given direction of engineering projects in the Louisvois Department.
