= War of Devolution =

War between France and Spain (1667–1668)

- Part of the wars of Louis XIV
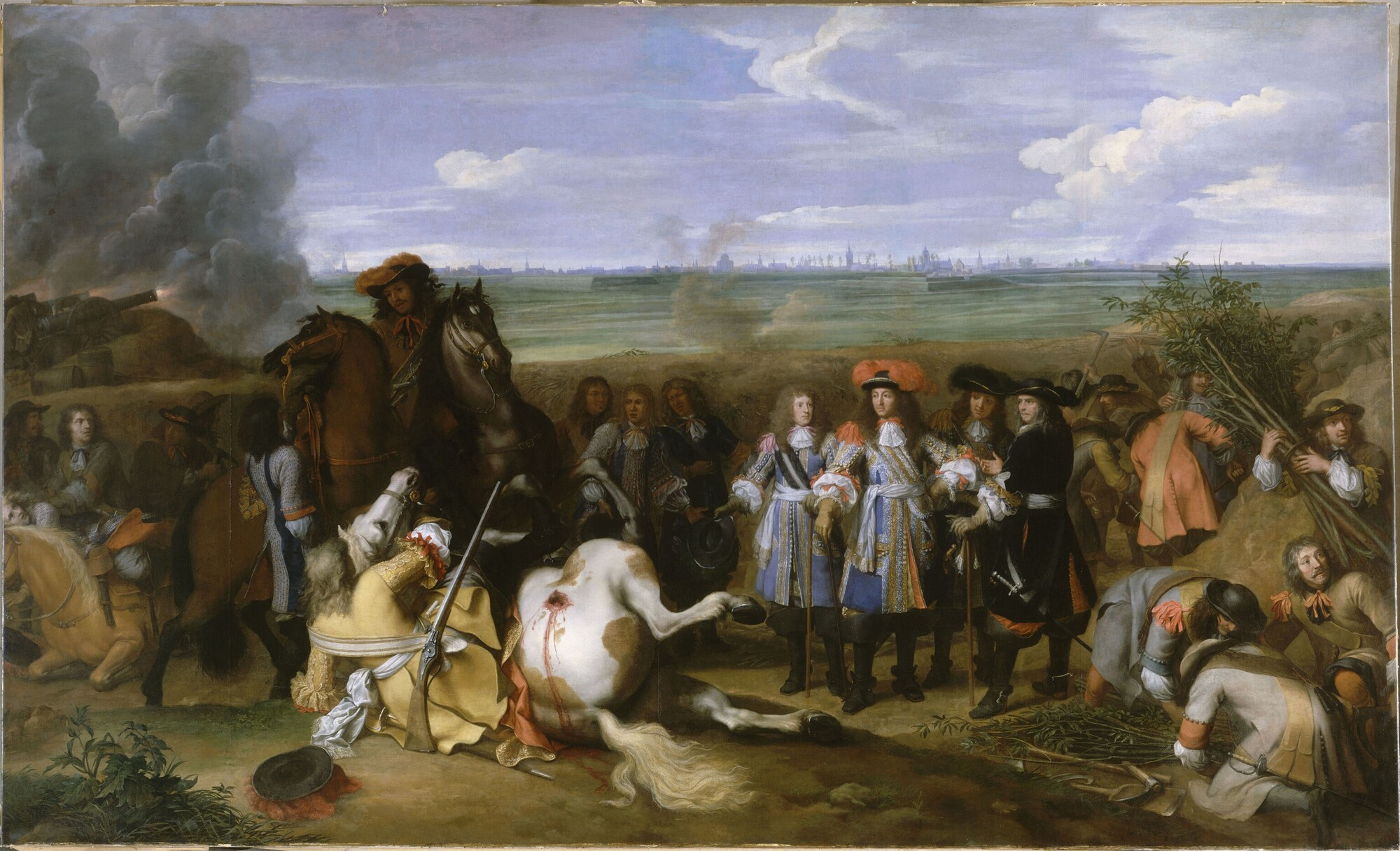
- Louis XIV visiting a trench during the war
Date	24 May 1667 – 2 May 1668
Location	Spanish Netherlands; Franche-Comté; Northern Catalonia
Result	Treaty of Aix-la-Chapelle (1668)
Territorial changes	France gains Armentières, Bergues, Charleroi, Kortrijk, Douai, Veurne, Lille, Oudenaarde and Tournai

Belligerents
France	(Spain) Spanish Empire

Commanders and leaders
(Kingdom of France) Louis XIV; (Kingdom of France) Turenne; (Kingdom of France) Duc d'Aumont; (Kingdom of France) de Créquy; (Kingdom of France) Prince de Condé; (Kingdom of France) Luxembourg; (Kingdom of France) Duc de Orléans	(Spain) Castelo Rodrigo; (Spain) De Marchin; (Spain) Du Bruay; (Spain) Téllez-Girón; (Spain) De Yenne; (Spain) Saint Martin

Strength
c. 50,000	30,000

Casualties and losses
2,000–4,500	2,000–3,000

The War of Devolution (Note: French: Guerre de Dévolution, Dutch: Devolutieoorlog) took place from May 1667 to May 1668. In the course of the war, France occupied large parts of the Spanish Netherlands and Franche-Comté, both then provinces of the Holy Roman Empire ruled by Spain. Its name derives from an obscure law known as the Jus Devolutionis, used by Louis XIV to claim that these territories had "devolved" to him by right of marriage to Maria Theresa of Spain.

The French encountered minimal resistance, but Louis returned much of their gains in the May 1668 Treaty of Aix-la-Chapelle. The terms were agreed by Emperor Leopold I in January 1668, reinforced by the Triple Alliance of England, Sweden and the Dutch Republic.

The French invasion of the Spanish Netherlands marked the end of the long-standing Franco-Dutch alliance, and was the first of Louis XIV's wars of expansion that dominated Western Europe for the last decades of the 17th century.

== Background ==
As part of the 1659 Treaty of the Pyrenees that ended the Franco-Spanish War, Louis XIV of France married Maria Theresa, eldest daughter of Philip IV of Spain. Despite being weakened by almost a century of continuous warfare, the Spanish Empire included possessions in Italy, the Spanish Netherlands, the Philippines and the Americas, and though no longer the dominant great power, remained largely intact. To prevent its acquisition by France, Maria Theresa renounced her inheritance rights; in return, Louis was promised a dowry of 500,000 gold écus, a huge sum that was never paid.

When Cardinal Mazarin died in 1661, Louis took control of the state and initiated an expansionist policy. His Finance Minister Jean-Baptiste Colbert argued that control of the Spanish Netherlands was essential to French economic growth, which implied conflict with not only France's traditional Habsburg rivals Spain and Austria, but also with the Dutch Republic, a long-term French ally. The 1648 Peace of Münster confirmed Dutch independence and gave Amsterdam control of trade through North-West Europe, by permanently closing the Scheldt estuary. Retaining this monopoly was a Dutch priority.

By 1663, Louis had concluded that the States General of the Netherlands would never voluntarily agree to his demands and began plans to seize the Spanish Netherlands, although negotiations continued to avoid raising suspicions. As required by the 1662 Franco-Dutch Treaty of Paris, France entered the Second Anglo-Dutch War in July 1665, providing an excuse for its military build up; Louis also calculated that this would make it harder for the Dutch to oppose him. Philip's death in September left his four-year-old son Charles as king, and his widow Mariana of Austria as regent. If Charles died, the Austrian Emperor Leopold I would inherit the Spanish Empire.

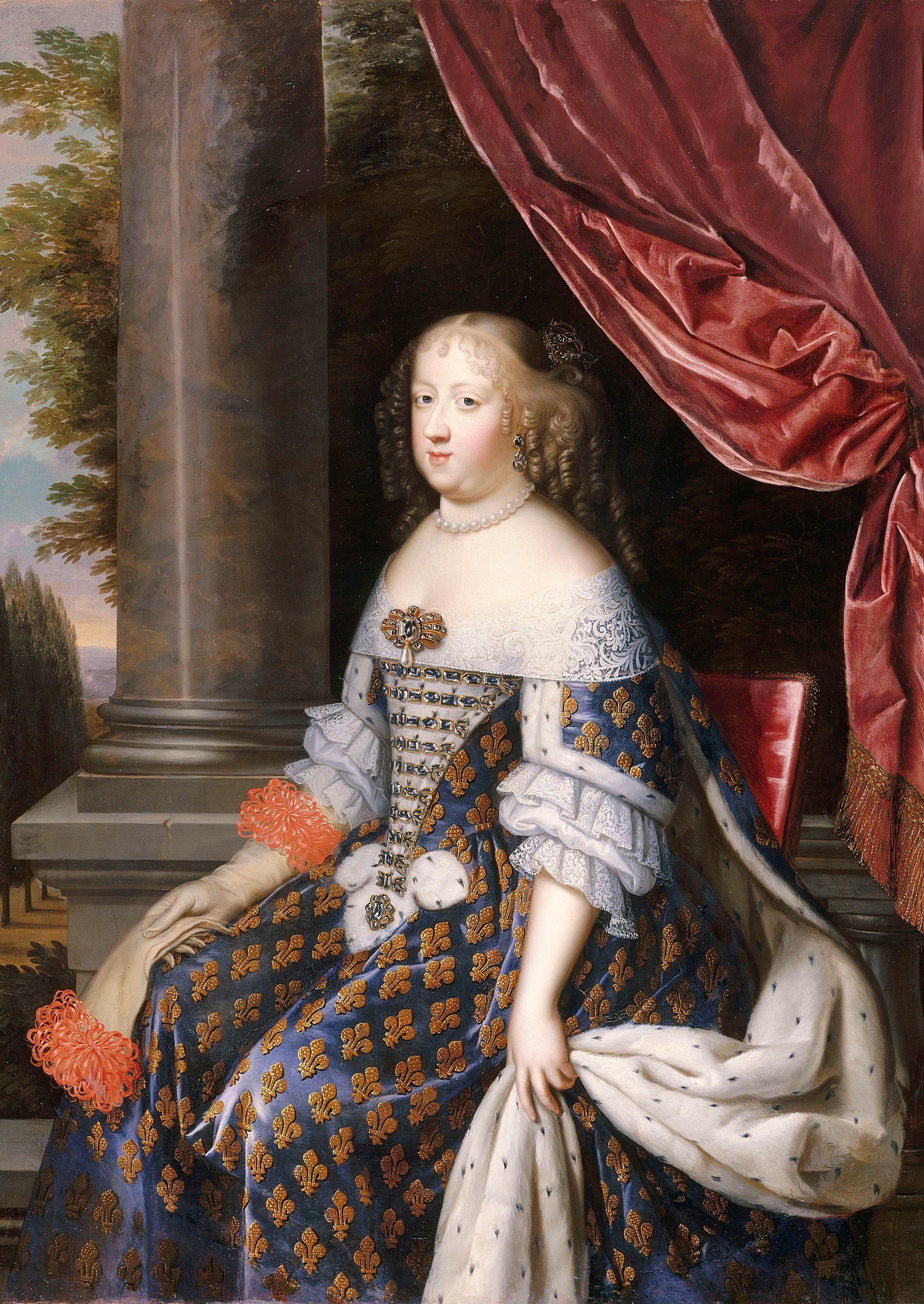
Maria Theresa of Spain, whose unpaid dowry was used to justify the war

French lawyers argued that as the dowry remained unpaid, Maria Theresa's renunciation was invalid, and her rights "devolved" to Louis under the Jus Devolutionis, an obscure law restricting inheritance to children from a first marriage. On this basis, he claimed most of the Spanish Netherlands, including Brabant and Limburg, the towns of Cambrai, Antwerp and Mechelen, Upper Guelders, the counties of Namur, Artois and Hainaut, and related possessions. Leopold and Mariana dismissed this claim, as the law applied only in Brabant, Namur and Hainault and concerned private property, not feudal rights; however, this gave Louis a legal justification for his actions.

Aware of French intentions, Mariana's government sought to end the Portuguese Restoration War, agree to an alliance with England, and break the Franco-Dutch relationship. Louis countered with the 1667 Treaty of Lisbon, a ten-year alliance with Portugal, and paid potential opponents like Brandenburg to remain neutral. Leopold was occupied with the Great Turkish War, while Foreign Minister Hugues de Lionne also extended the anti-Austrian League of the Rhine until 1668.

On 8 May, every French ambassador in Europe read out a declaration, claiming Louis was taking possession of lands that rightfully belonged to him. In mid-May, talks to end the Anglo-Dutch War opened in Breda between the Dutch Republic, Denmark–Norway, France and England; shortly before, Grand Pensionary Johan de Witt of the Dutch Republic learned Louis and Charles II of England had secretly agreed to terms in advance, increasing the pressure on the Dutch not to oppose French aims.

The impending war ended Spain's reluctance to accept Portuguese sovereignty; the Anglo-Spanish Treaty of Madrid, signed on 23 May, granted England substantial commercial privileges, in return for help in ending the war with Portugal.

== War ==
=== May to September 1667; the Spanish Netherlands ===
The Spanish Netherlands, 1667 campaign; note modern Franco-Belgian boundary, blue lines indicate rivers

The Spanish Netherlands was a compact area, dominated by canals and rivers. Until the advent of railways in the 19th century, goods and supplies were largely transported by water; campaigns in this theatre focused on control of strongpoints along rivers such as the Lys, Sambre and Meuse.

After 1659, a series of military reforms initiated by Michel Le Tellier made the French army more professional, while improving its logistic support. This allowed them to put larger numbers in the field, for longer periods; by 1667, the army had an authorised strength of 80,000, of whom 51,000 were deployed for the campaign.

Turenne was appointed supreme commander; his main force of 35,000 men and the artillery train were concentrated around Mézières, on the River Meuse. Another 9,000 under Antoine d'Aumont prepared to advance up the Lys, via Kortrijk and Oudenaarde; de Créquy and 6,000 light cavalry were based at Sierck-les-Bains, securing their flank against an attack from Germany. Accompanied by Louis and his entourage, the French crossed the border on 24 May.

Aware of these preparations, Spanish governor Castelo Rodrigo urgently requested additional funds from Madrid. Despite spending the enormous sum of 1.5 million escudos on her daughter's wedding, Mariana managed to increase the forces available to him from 11,000 in mid 1666 to 27,000 by April 1667.

Although this was insufficient to defend every position, the Spanish did not need to do so. Given time, it was accepted even the strongest fortifications would fall and their primary purpose was to delay, while the defenders mobilised reserves or found a diplomatic solution. Capturing towns was relatively easy, holding them far harder, since every garrison weakened the field army; over the next century, the French confronted this strategic dilemma time and again in this theatre.

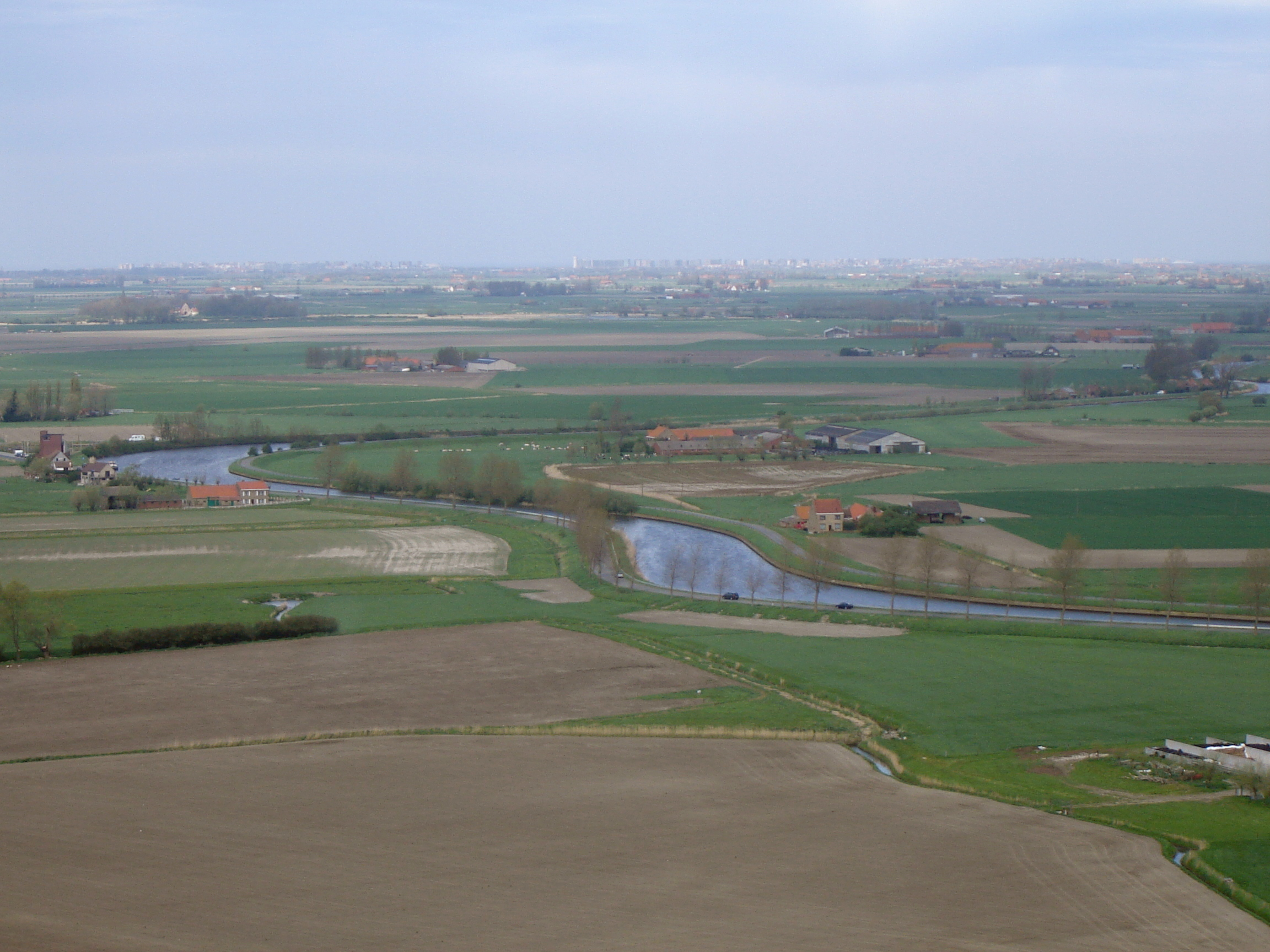
The Yser river, in Maritime Flanders; a good example of the geography in this area

Turenne's first objective was Charleroi, a key Spanish supply base; Castelo Rodrigo could not hold it and withdrew to Brussels, first destroying its fortifications. On 2 June, De Montal was appointed French governor and given a garrison of 3,000, while Vauban began rebuilding its defences. By the end of July, Rochebaron had captured Tournai, Kortrijk and Oudenaarde; Turenne advanced on Dendermonde, intending to take Antwerp.

On 31 July, peace treaties were signed at Breda (between England and each of its opponents in the Second Anglo-Dutch War) and the Dutch began discussions with England and Spain on creating a diplomatic alliance against France. At the same time, Castelo Rodrigo opened the water defences, flooding the land and bringing the French advance to a halt. Turenne withdrew and on 10 August besieged Lille, capital of the Walloon region and an important commercial centre.

The garrison were allowed to withdraw after surrendering on 28 August; three days later, de Marchin and a Spanish relief force of 12,000 ran into a French cavalry detachment on the Bruges road. Ordered to cut off his retreat, Bellefonds and de Créquy inflicted nearly 2,000 casualties; in early 1668, Louis created both Marshals of France. On 12 September, Turenne captured Aalst but although his troops suffered relatively few battle casualties, sickness was a far bigger problem; in early October, campaigning ended for the winter.

=== Negotiations; winter 1667/1668 ===
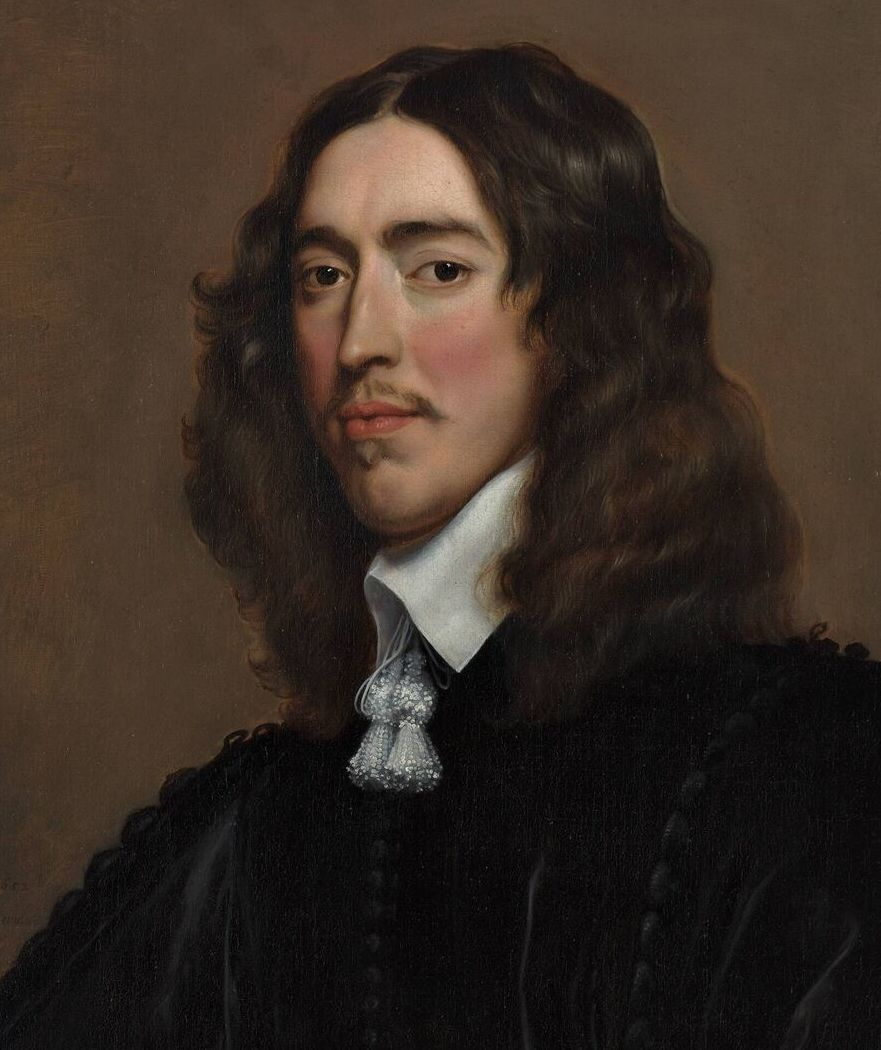
Johan de Witt, Dutch Grand Pensionary; he had to persuade Louis to withdraw, while keeping him as an ally

On 31 July 1667, the Treaty of Breda ended the Anglo-Dutch War and negotiations began on a common front against France. This was driven by the States of Zeeland, supported by Sir William Temple, English ambassador in the Hague and Brussels, and Francois-Paul de Lisola, Leopold's representative in London.

De Witt summarised the Dutch dilemma as follows; 'to abandon Spain is to make France a present of the Netherlands, to take on her defence alone is folly.' Although he and Charles of England preferred France, the vast majority of their countrymen did not, which meant they had to satisfy domestic opinion by making Louis retreat, but remain friends. According to the French ambassador in Sweden, Charles quickly recognised this was almost impossible, and focused on ensuring Louis blamed De Witt.

From April 1667 to June 1668, Franco-Dutch trade declined by 30%, due to the imposition of French tariffs. Combined with the prospect of France as a neighbour, this led to widespread support for an Anglo-Dutch alliance among Orangists, the States General and the general populace. In England, Parliament and business wanted peace, while most preferred Spain for strategic and commercial reasons, including chief minister Lord Arlington; an Anglo-Dutch alliance in support of Spain seemed the ideal solution. Finally, it allowed Charles of England to keep Parliament happy, while demonstrating Dutch unreliability and thus increasing the price Louis would pay for his support in the 1670 Treaty of Dover.

In September, De Witt promised to ensure Spain accepted French terms for ending the war, but Louis insisted he commit to enforcing them if needed. When Mariana refused, he persuaded the States of Holland to pass resolutions on 10 December and 14 January 1668, approving military action against Spain. This was strongly resisted by the other provinces, and the Orangist opposition in Holland.

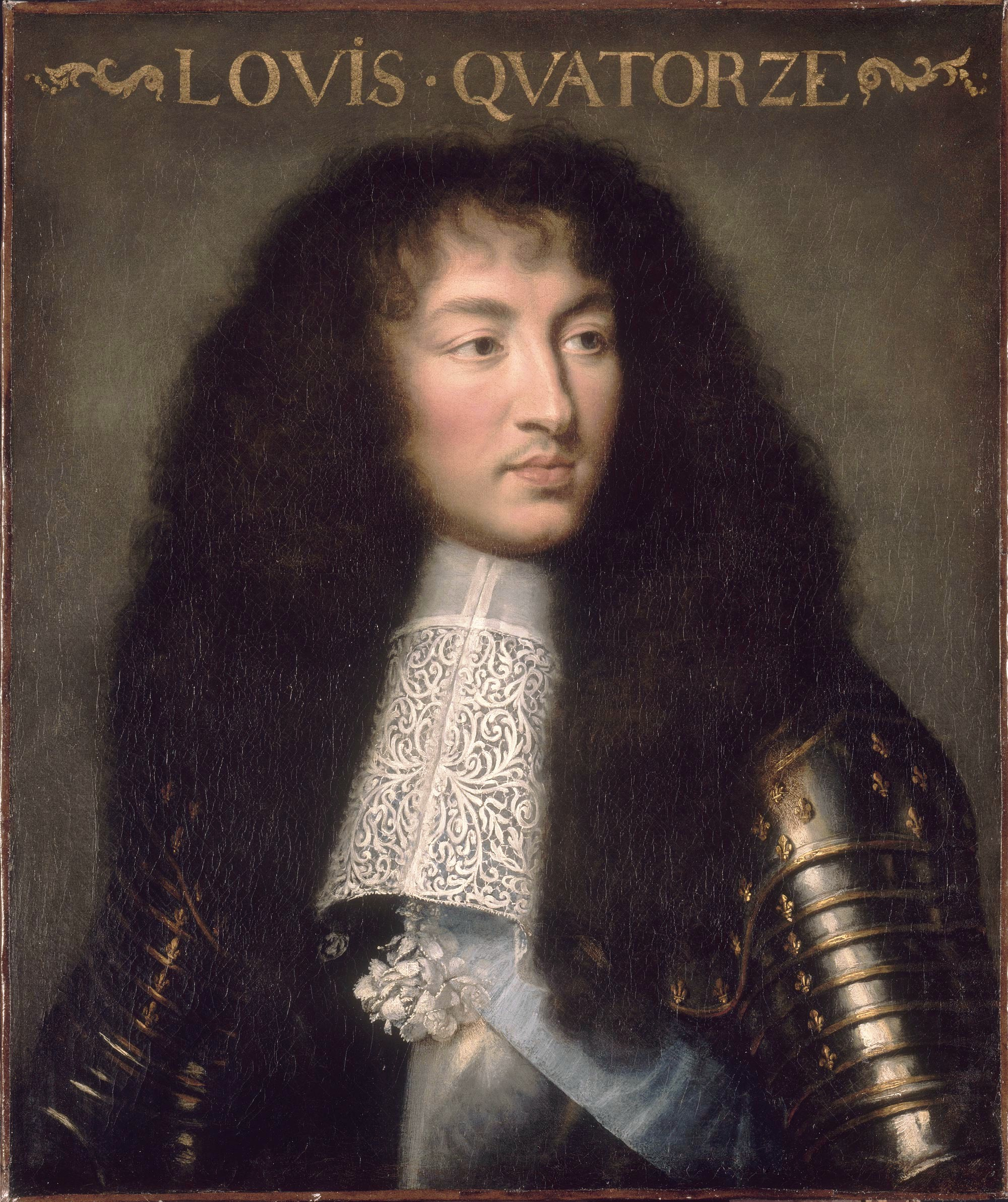
Louis XIV, ca 1661

When Philip died in 1665, Spain's only ally was Leopold; by 1668, their diplomats had built relationships with the Orangists, England, and traditional French supporters like Sweden and Brandenburg. In September 1667, Afonso VI of Portugal was deposed by his brother Pedro, who opened discussions on ending the Restoration war. The 1667 agreement with France was annulled and on 13 February 1668, Spain recognised Portuguese independence with the Treaty of Lisbon.

To fund the 1668 campaign, Castelo Rodrigo agreed to a loan of 2 million guilders from the Amsterdam financial markets; as security, the Dutch would be allowed to occupy Bruges, Ostend and Damme. The prospect of peace with Portugal meant Mariana could reject these conditions; she sent Castelo Rodrigo letters of credit for 600,000 escudos and one million bars of silver. This allowed him to begin recruiting, while Brandenburg agreed to supply 12,000 troops.

On 20 January, Louis and Leopold signed a Partition Treaty, agreeing to the division of the Spanish Empire if Charles of Spain died; this included the terms given to De Witt in September. The Triple Alliance was signed by England and the Dutch Republic on 23 January, and the third member, Sweden, formally joined on 5 May, three days after Aix-la-Chapelle. It contained a pact of mutual defence, an agreement to ensure Spain accepted French terms, and secret clauses, including military action against France if Louis reneged on this promise.

Ruvigny, French ambassador in London, received a copy within days, allegedly from Arlington, which he passed onto Lionne. Writing ten years later, largely to justify the subsequent Franco-Dutch War, Louis claimed it was a calculated insult by the 'ungrateful Dutch nation', but his reaction at the time was far more moderate. The French recognised the military clause was largely unenforceable; as Turenne observed, 'the Dutch have more ill-will than power, the English neither troops or money'. Lionne also pointed out the Alliance's guarantee applied to both sides, obliging Spain to comply with French terms 'without it costing us a sou.'

=== February 1668; the campaign in Franche-Comté ===
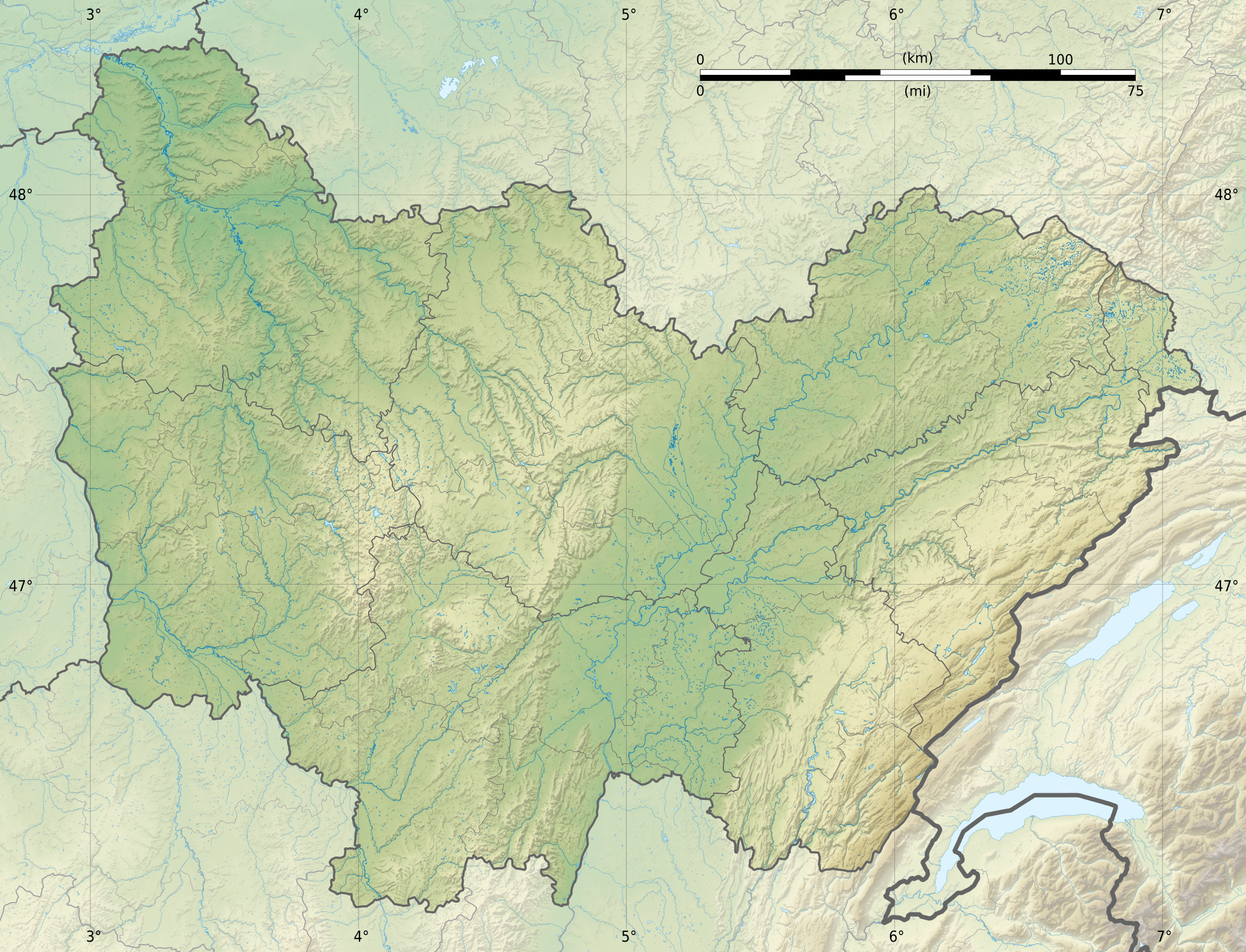
Modern department of Bourgogne (left) and Franche-Comté (right); key locations 1668 campaign

Throughout his career, Louis sought to improve his position prior to negotiations; in September, he decided to occupy Franche-Comté. It was almost impossible for Spain to defend, while its governor, the Marquis de Yenne, had fewer than 2,000 men to hold the entire province. French armies also benefitted from vastly superior logistics, allowing them to open campaigns before their opponents were ready. The invasion was planned for early February, normally considered impractical for troop movements, adding the factor of surprise to superior numbers.

The operation was commanded by the Prince de Condé. Once France's leading general, he fought against Louis during the 1648 to 1653 Fronde, then with Spain until 1659; this was his first command since returning from exile in 1660. Franche-Comté was considered part of Burgundy, his family's traditional power base and his selection demonstrated royal control over an area with a long history as an independent state.

To keep his opponents guessing, Louis announced plans to double the army to 134,000 and leaked details of a proposed 1668 campaign. Led by himself and Turenne, 66,000 men would complete the conquest of the Spanish Netherlands; a subsidiary force under Philippe of Orléans would attack Catalonia, with Condé in the Three Bishoprics to deter an attack from Germany.

This provided cover for assembling troops and supplies in Dijon; by early February, Condé had 12,000 infantry and 3,000 cavalry concentrated near Auxonne. He divided the army into two columns, the other led by Luxembourg, and entered Franche-Comté on 4 February. Besançon and Salins-les-Bains surrendered on 7 February, after which Condé and Luxembourg moved onto Dole, where they were joined by Louis on 9 February. His presence resulted in a largely unnecessary assault, which cost the French between 400 and 500 casualties, their only significant losses of the campaign. Dole surrendered on 14 February, followed by the provincial capital of Gray on 19th; Louis was back in Saint-Germain on 24th.

=== May 1668; Northern Catalonia ===
On the southern front, the Spanish took the initiative; the Duke of Osuna, Viceroy of Catalonia, invaded the Upper Cerdanya with 2,300 infantry and 200 cavalry. Weak French defences allowed him to capture 55 villages in the region, although irregular local miquelets combined with the French military in resisting the invasion. Spanish incursions continued until 1669, forcing the French to fortify the border.

=== Treaty of Aix-la-Chapelle ===
With the largest army in Europe, Turenne, Condé and Orléans argued for continuing the war. Lionne, Colbert and Le Tellier recommended peace, primarily on financial grounds; the 1660s was a period of significant economic decline, and war was expensive. France was unprepared for a naval war against the Dutch and English, and while Colbert had initiated policies aimed at reducing its dependence on Dutch shipping for transporting goods, this would take time. In addition to those already contracted with Brandenburg, Charles of Lorraine offered Mariana another 8,000 men.

In February, seven year old Charles was reported to be suffering from smallpox, an often fatal disease; his death would give Louis a good chance of achieving his objectives without fighting. The combination decided him on peace; on 25 April, the Treaty of Saint Germain, between France, England and the Republic, finalised terms, which were then incorporated into the Treaty of Aix-la-Chapelle, signed by Spain and France on 2 May.

== Aftermath ==
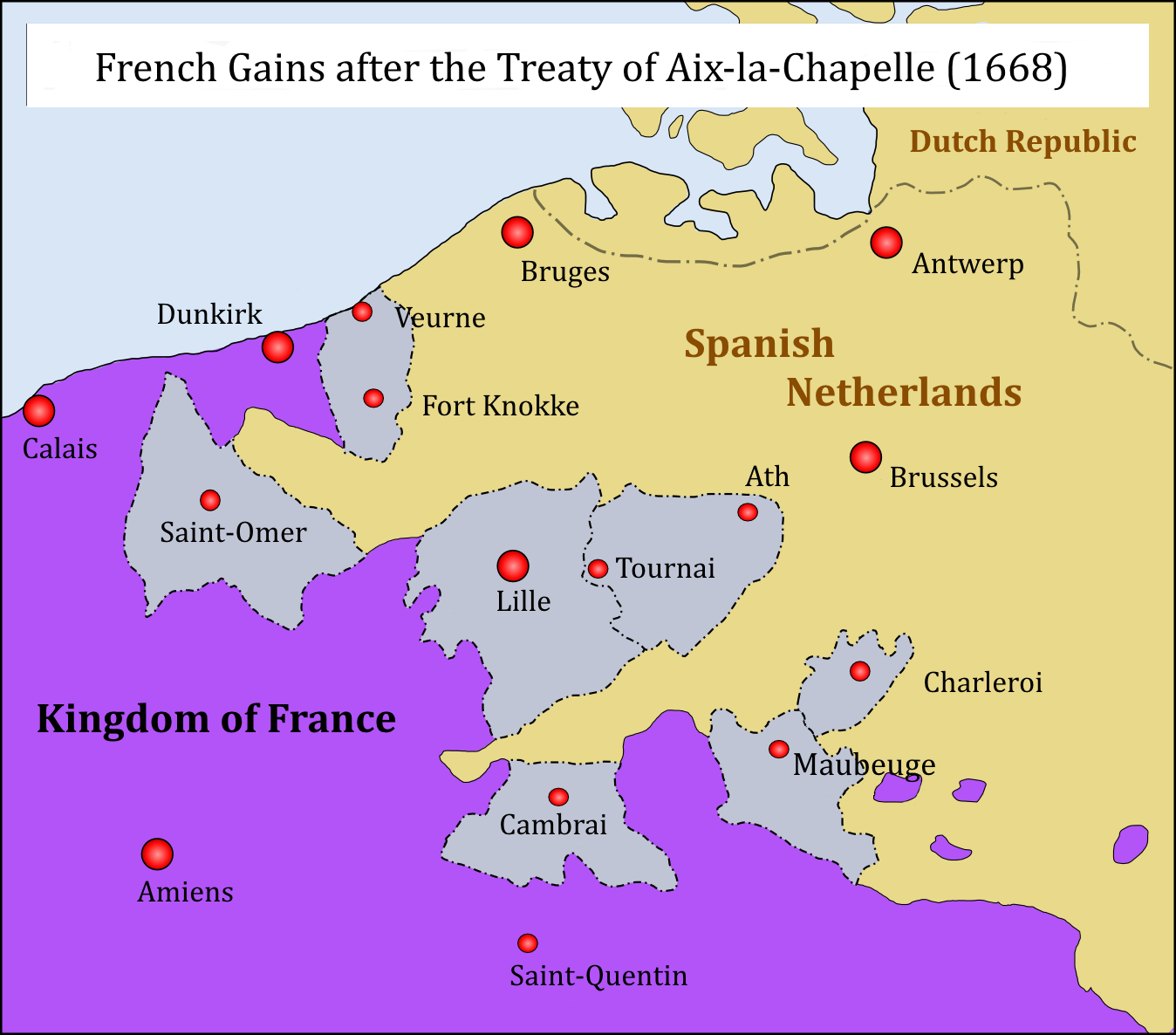
French gains by Treaty of Aix-la-Chapelle: Louis returned Cambrai, Aire and Saint-Omer, but retained the rest

France withdrew from Franche-Comté and the Spanish Netherlands, with the exception of eleven towns and their surrounding areas. Lille, Armentières, Bergues and Douai were considered essential to reinforce France's vulnerable northern border and remain French to this day. The retention of Tournai, Oudenaarde, Kortrijk, Veurne, Binche, Charleroi and Ath made future offensives much easier, as demonstrated in 1672.

From a military perspective, France strengthened its northern border, and Vauban began work on the defence line that became known as the Ceinture de fer. Possession of towns like Charleroi and Tournai facilitated future campaigns through the control of vital routes into the Spanish Netherlands, but they were easily isolated and required expensive garrisons.

The political results were mixed; in the Partition Treaty, Leopold recognised Louis' right to inherit part of the Spanish Empire, much to the anger of Spain. However, Louis' expansionist ambitions sparked discussions on an anti-French coalition, culminating in the formation of the 1689 Grand Alliance.

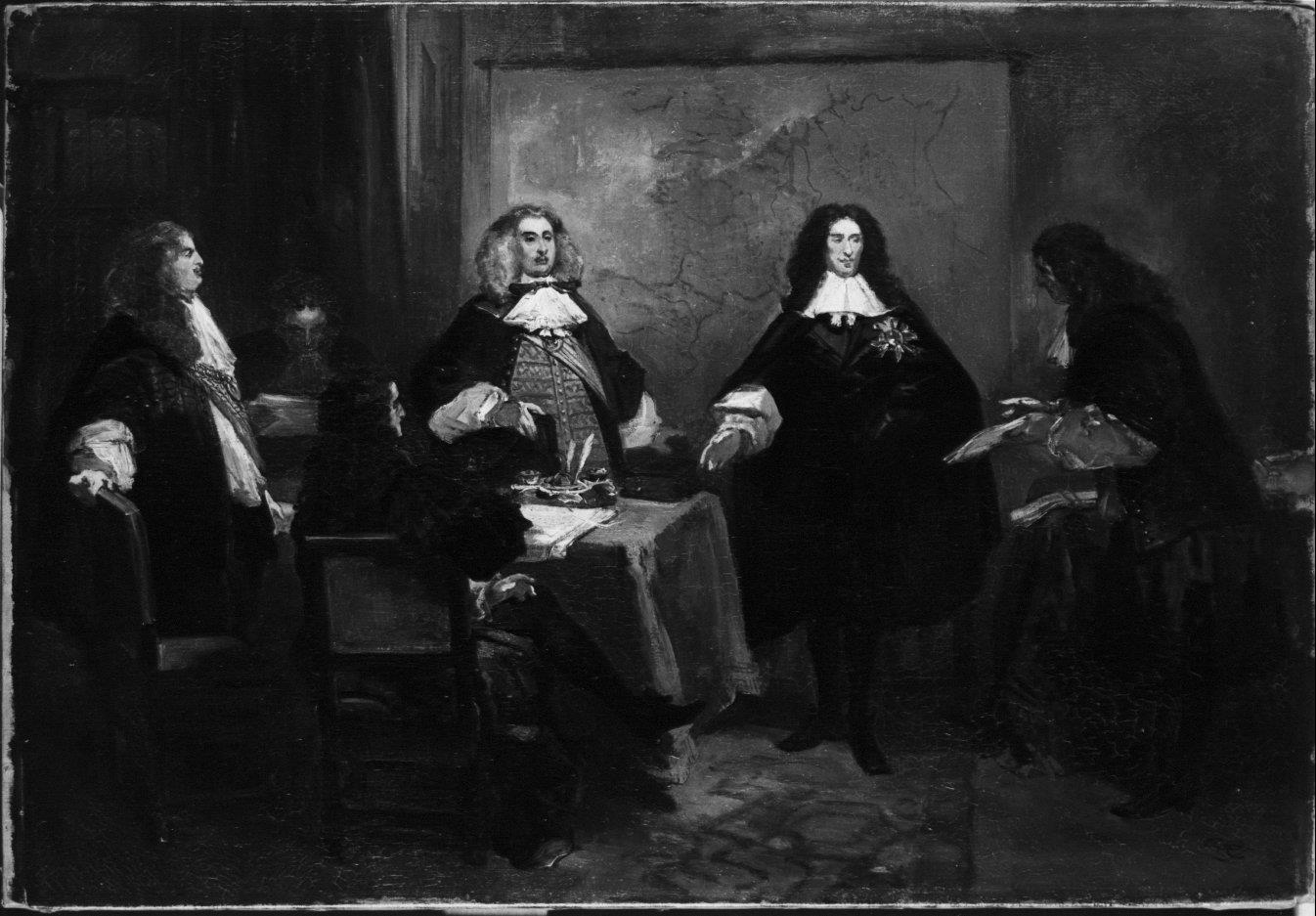
Spanish and French diplomats at the Peace of Aix-la-Chapelle. Both sides were unhappy with the Dutch. The Spanish envoy said it was now Holland's turn. The French envoy d' Estrades noted that they would repay the cheese merchants for their duplicity with usury.

The role of the Triple Alliance in the peace is debated by modern historians. Its real significance was aligning English and Dutch objectives, despite the brief interruption in 1672 of the deeply unpopular Third Anglo-Dutch War; the Dutch viewed Aix-la-Chapelle as a diplomatic triumph.

Concern over French ambitions also revived the Orangist party, increasing internal political conflict with De Witt's Republican faction. One result was the deliberate neglect of the Dutch army, generally seen as bolstering the power of the William III of Orange; this had catastrophic repercussions in 1672. Louis went to war in 1667 believing the Dutch would never voluntarily agree to the concessions he required in the Spanish Netherlands; he now decided the best way to achieve this was to first defeat the Republic, and began planning the Franco-Dutch War.
