= Treaty of Lisbon (1667) =

Peace treaty between France and Portugal

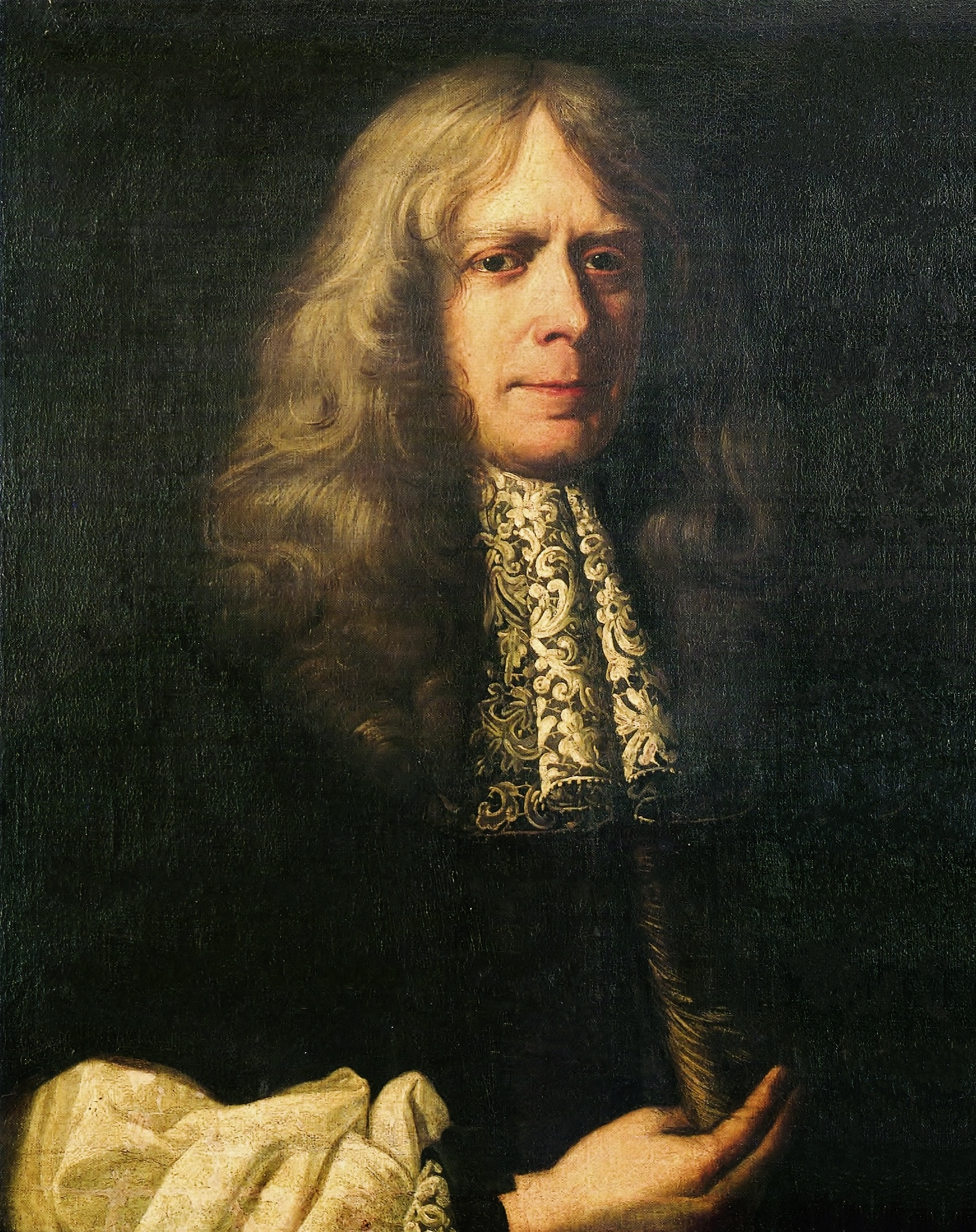
- Portuguese chief minister, Count Castelo Melhor, architect of the treaty
- Context: France and Portugal sign a 10-year defensive treaty against Spain
- Signed: 31 March 1667
- Location: Lisbon
- Negotiators: (Kingdom of France) Marquis de St Romain (Portugal) Count Castelo Melhor
- Signatories: (Kingdom of France) Marquis de St Romain (Portugal) Marquês de Nisa
- Parties: France; Kingdom of Portugal
- Ratifiers: (Kingdom of France) Louis XIV (Portugal) Afonso VI
- Language: Latin

The Treaty of Lisbon was signed on 31 March 1667 by Portugal and France, which agreed to a ten-year defensive and offensive alliance against Spain. The treaty was driven by Louis XIV, who was preparing to seize the Spanish Netherlands. The Portuguese Restoration War, which had begun in 1640, was coming to an end. Ensuring that it continued would absorb Spanish resources and prevent Spain from sending reinforcements.

At the same time, England, France and the Dutch Republic were opening talks to end the 1665 to 1667 Second Anglo-Dutch War. English diplomats wanted a quick conclusion to the Portuguese Restoration War, hoping to create an Anglo-Spanish-Portuguese coalition against the Dutch, and thus obtain better terms. Louis wanted to block this, as such an alliance could interfere with his invasion plans.

The treaty successfully achieved both aims and when the War of Devolution commenced on 24 May, France occupied most of the Spanish Netherlands with minimal interference, followed by Franche-Comté in 1668. However, other powers saw French expansion as a common threat; on 27 May 1667, Spain and England signed the Treaty of Madrid, and on 31 July, the Treaty of Breda ended the Anglo-Dutch War.

The pro-French Portuguese chief minister, Count Castelo Melhor, was removed from office in September, and Spain and Portugal made peace in the February 1668 Treaty of Lisbon. This cleared the way for the 1668 Triple Alliance between England, the Dutch Republic and Sweden, which forced France to return most of its conquests to Spain in the Treaty of Aix-la-Chapelle.

== Background ==
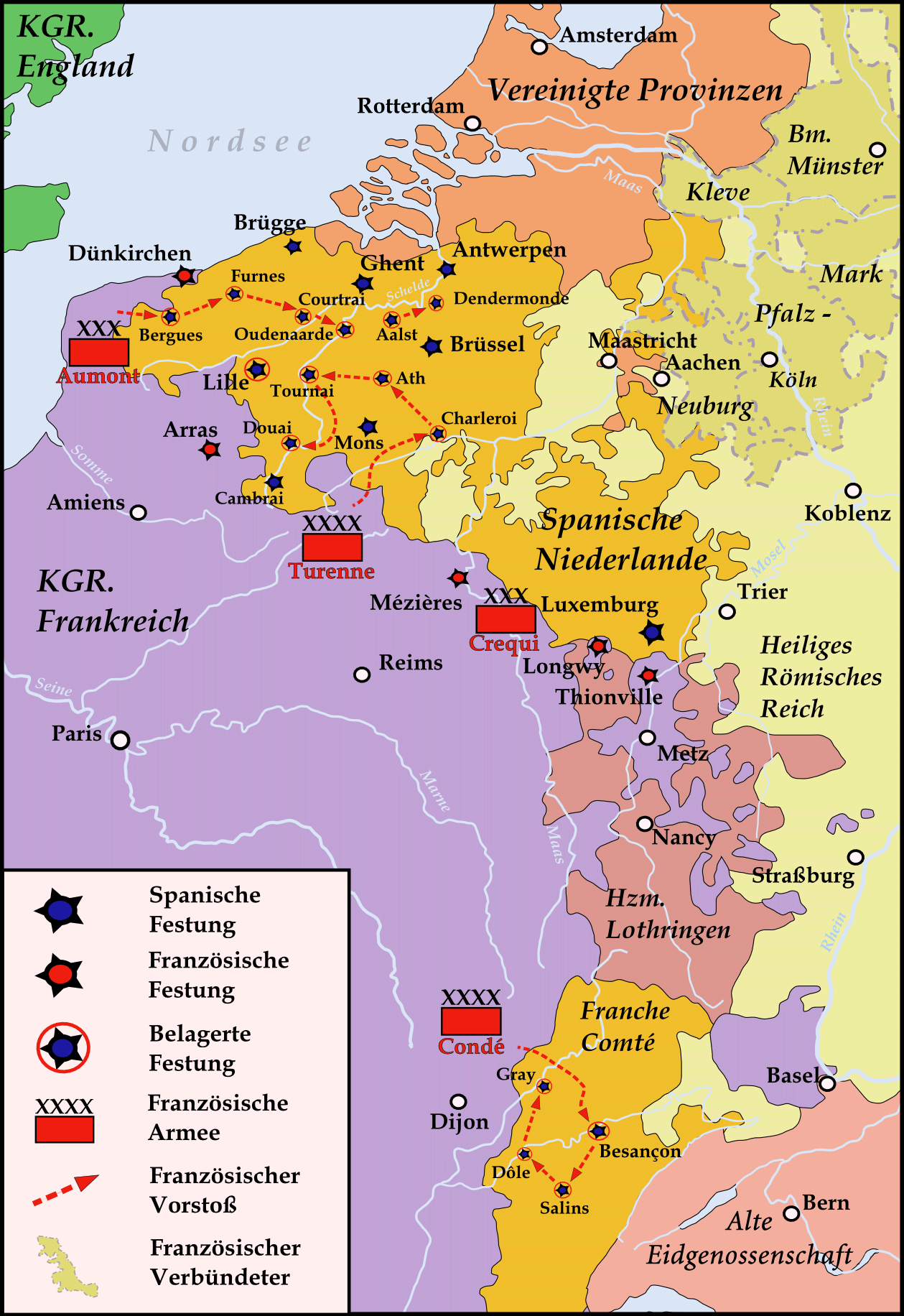
The treaty was designed to facilitate the French occupation of the Spanish Netherlands.

The treaty was one of a series of agreements signed between 1662 and 1668 in response to changes in the European balance of power. France supported the Dutch Republic during the Eighty Years' War with Spain as part of a general policy of opposing Habsburg power. The war substantially weakened Spain, and the 1648 Peace of Münster confirmed Dutch independence and permanently closed the Scheldt estuary. It also gave Amsterdam control of imports and exports through Northwestern Europe and eliminated its closest rival, Antwerp. Retaining that monopoly became a Dutch priority.

Jean-Baptiste Colbert, the French finance minister, argued that Antwerp and the Spanish Netherlands were essential for France's economic growth. By 1663, Louis concluded that the Dutch would never make the concessions that he required and so he began preparations to seize the Spanish Netherlands. The treaty was intended to minimise Spain's ability to reinforce its garrisons.

In 1581, the Crowns of Portugal and Spain were united under Philip II, but opposition to Spanish policies led to the Portuguese Restoration War in 1640. By the end of 1665, attempts to reconquer Portugal had clearly failed, and Spanish government finances had collapsed under the strain of paying for the war. The Crown declared bankruptcy seven times between 1643 and 1666. The death of Philip IV in September 1665 left his four-year-old-son as king and resulted in a struggle for control between Mariana of Austria and John of Austria.

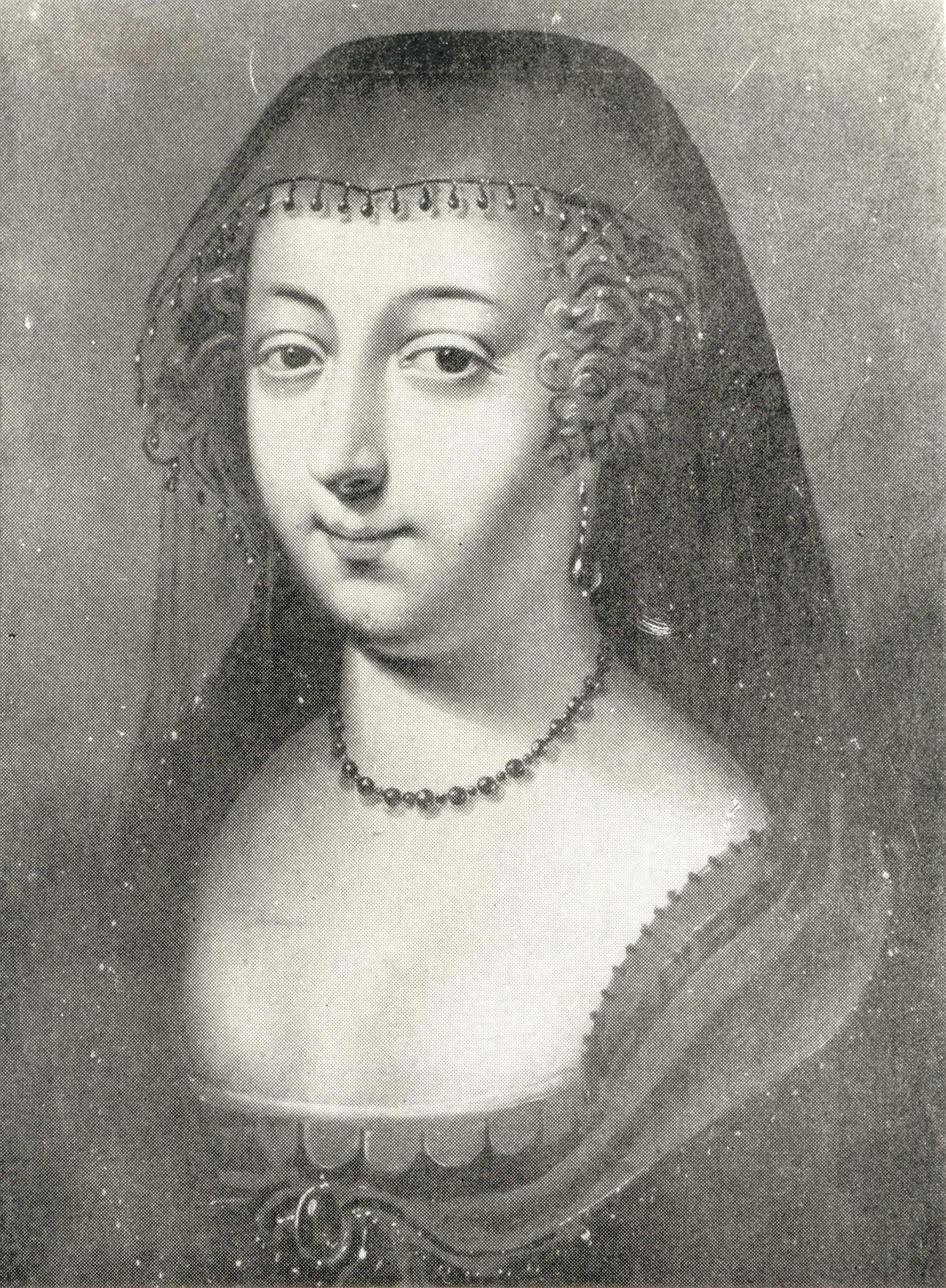
Maria Francisca of Savoy, whose marriage to Afonso was a preliminary to the agreement but proved unsuccessful.

Afonso VI succeeded as king of Portugal in 1656; as he was physically impaired and mentally unstable, his mother, Luisa de Guzmán, controlled the government. In 1662, she was removed in a coup, organised by the Count of Castelo Melhor; Afonso made him chief minister and sent Luisa to a convent, where she died in February 1666.

The Portuguese government was split into pro-French and pro-English factions, led respectively by Castelo Melhor and Afonso's younger brother, Pedro. In 1662, Charles II of England married Afonso's sister Catherine and provided military support, which, although limited, proved to be decisive in defeating the 1663–1665 Spanish offensive. After the Second Anglo-Dutch War began in 1665, English diplomats focused on building an Anglo-Portuguese-Spanish alliance against the Dutch, and they offered to mediate between both countries.

Castelo Melhor suggested Charles' marriage to Catherine to be balanced by a French princess marrying into the Portuguese royal family. Maria Francisca of Savoy was selected for that role; she was first offered to Pedro, who turned her down, but then was accepted by Afonso. Louis persuaded Charles to agree by providing the unpaid portion of Catherine's dowry. Maria arrived in Portugal on 2 August 1666, accompanied by a new French ambassador, the Marquis de St Romain. The wedding took place the same day; Afonso left the festivities early and reportedly displayed a similar lack of interest in consummating the marriage.

In the early stages of the Restoration War, Portugal had licensed English and Dutch privateers to operate against Spanish merchant shipping. The Dutch used the opportunity to attack Portuguese colonies. Under the 1661 Treaty of The Hague, Portugal gave up most of its territories in Asia but retained those in Brazil and Africa. Castelo Melhor and others within the Portuguese elite believed that a rupture between France and the Dutch Republic was inevitable and that a treaty with France would provide an opportunity to regain those losses.

== Terms ==
For Louis, the treaty was a way to threaten Spain without declaring war. He argued that the Spanish Netherlands were his by right, making the War of Devolution a 'voyage'. Castelo Melhor hoped the French alliance would end the Restoration War on terms favourable to Portugal.

There was also an agreement that if England formally ended the 1654–1660 Anglo-Spanish War, France would declare war on Spain within 30 months or pay the Portuguese 900,000 cruzados. Portugal would continue the war with Spain and, in return, would receive a subsidy of 600,000 cruzados a month. The treaty gave French merchants the same commercial advantages that had been granted to the English and Dutch. Louis also agreed to demand the return of Portuguese trading posts of Kannur and Kochi, in India, which had been seized by the Dutch in 1663.

The parties also agreed not to make peace until Spain complied with Louis' claims in the Spanish Netherlands, which potentially required Portugal to continue the war for France's benefit. Although that was balanced by a French commitment to ensure the Portuguese regained any territories held by the Spanish, they had already achieved that in reality.

== Aftermath ==
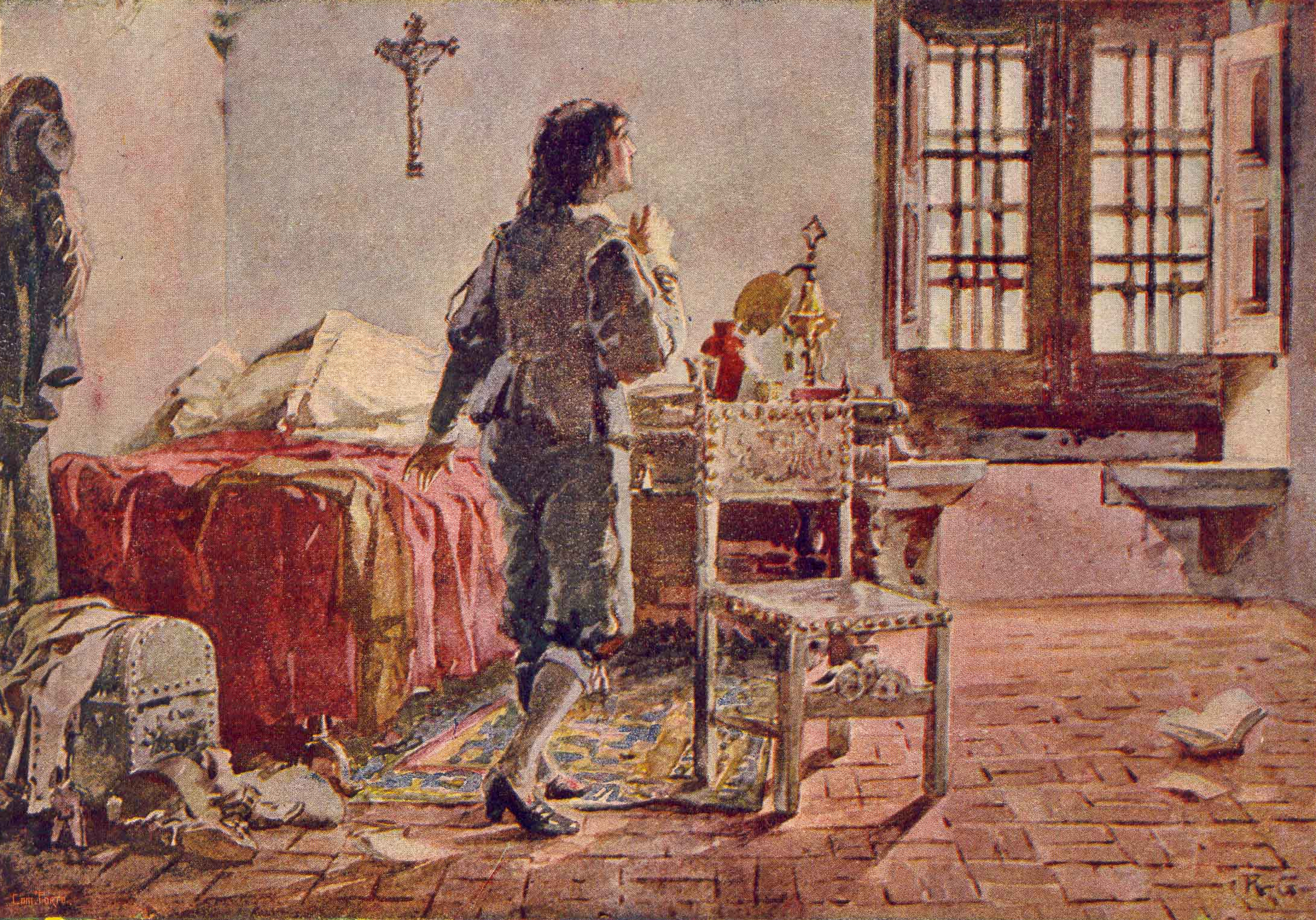
Afonso VI, deposed by Pedro and held in the Palace of Sintra.

Louis achieved his objective of minimising interference with his occupation of the Spanish Netherlands, but other powers began to see France as a common threat. On 27 May, Spain and England signed the Treaty of Madrid, followed, on 31 July, by the Treaty of Breda, which ended the Anglo-Dutch War. That led to the 1668 Triple Alliance between England, the Dutch Republic and Sweden, which forced France to return most of its conquests in the Treaty of Aix-la-Chapelle.

Although Castelo Melhor considered the marriage and the treaty with France to be a triumph, Portugal was financially exhausted and needed to focus on rebuilding its trading networks. Many opposed an agreement that committed them to continuing the war on France's behalf, especially the clause preventing a separate peace. In addition, Maria was an intelligent and resolute individual who wanted to serve French interests and exercise real power. Afonso was controlled by Castelo Melhor, who had no intention of allowing that. She was thus driven to co-operate with her brother-in-law Pedro at first before she allegedly began an affair with him.

Maria persuaded Louis that Pedro was a better asset for furthering French interests. In September, Castelo Melhor was dismissed and went into exile in England, where he became an advisor to King Charles II. In January 1668, the Cortes appointed Pedro as regent, and Afonso spent the rest of his life in close confinement, initially the Azores and then the Palace of Sintra in Lisbon, where he died in 1683.

That facilitated the February 1668 Treaty of Lisbon, which ended the war between Spain and Portugal. Maria retired to a convent and asked for her marriage to be annulled on the grounds of non-consummation. That was approved by her relative, Cardinal Vendôme. She then married Pedro in September 1668.

== Sources ==
- Ames, Glenn (1997). "Pedro II and the 'Estado Da India': Braganzan Absolutism and Overseas Empire, 1668–1683". Luso-Brazilian Review. 34 (2): 1–13. JSTOR 3514147.
- Ames, Glenn J (2014). Renascent Empire?: Pedro II and the Quest for Stability in Portuguese Monsoon Asia, ca.1640–1682. Amsterdam University Press. ISBN 978-905356382-3 – via Internet Archive.
- Cowans, Jon (2003). Modern Spain: A Documentary History. U. of Pennsylvania Press. ISBN 0-8122-1846-9.
- Davenport, Frances Gardiner; Paullin, Charles Oscar, eds. (1917). European Treaties Bearing on the History of the United States and Its Dependencies, Vol. 2: 1650-1697 (Forgotten Books reprint ed.). Carnegie Institution of Washington. ISBN 978-048315892-4.
- Geyl, P (1936). "Johan de Witt, Grand Pensionary of Holland, 1653–72". History. 20 (80): 303–319. doi:10.1111/j.1468-229X.1936.tb00103.x. JSTOR 24401084.
- Gooskens, Frans (2016). Sweden and the Treaty of Breda in 1667 – Swedish diplomats help to end naval warfare between the Dutch Republic and England (PDF). De Oranje-boom; Historical and Archeology Circle of the City and Country of Breda.
- Israel, Jonathan (1989). Dutch Primacy in World Trade, 1585–1740. Oxford University Press. ISBN 978-019821139-6.
- Livermore, HV (1966). A New History of Portugal. Cambridge University Press. ISBN 978-052105566-6.
- Macintosh, Claude Truman (1973). French Diplomacy during the War of Devolution, the Triple Alliance and the Treaty of Aix-la-Chapelle. Xerox University Microfilms – OhioLINK ETD: Ohio State University; PHD thesis.
- Mitchell, Silvia Z (2013). Mariana of Austria and Imperial Spain: Court, Dynastic, and International Politics in Seventeenth- Century Europe. University of Miami Scholarly Repository.
