= Treaty of Madrid (1670) =

1670 treaty between England and Spain

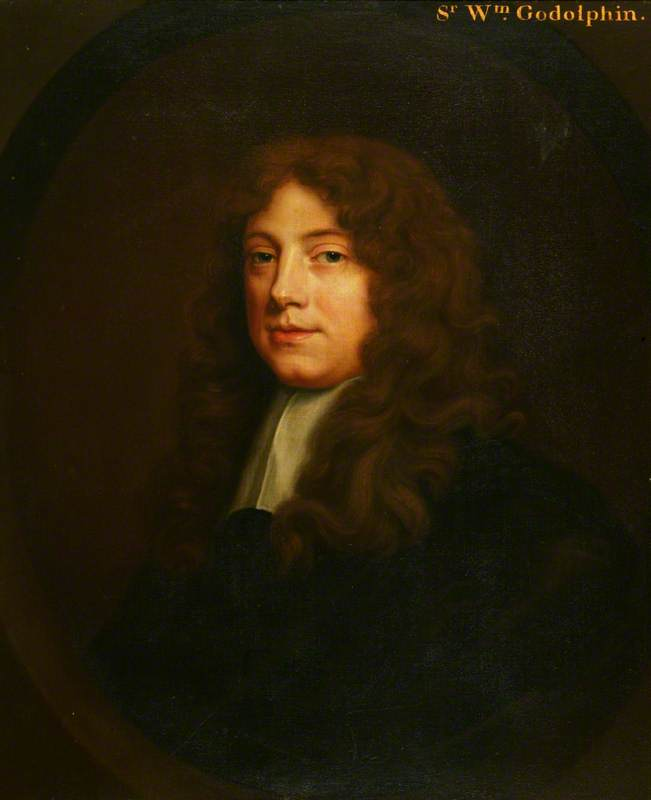
- William Godolphin by Peter Lely
- Context: A treaty for the composing of differences, restraining of depredations, and establishing of peace in America, between the crowns of Great Britain and Spain, concluded at Madrid the 8/18 day of July, in the year of our Lord 1670.
- Signed: 8 July 1670
- Location: Madrid
- Condition: 28 September 1670
- Negotiators: (Kingdom of England) William Godolphin (Spain) Gaspar de Bracamonte (Spain) Count of Peñaranda
- Signatories: (Kingdom of England) William Godolphin (Spain) Gaspar de Bracamonte (Spain) Count of Peñaranda
- Parties: England; Spain
- Ratifiers: (Kingdom of England) Charles II of England; Mariana of Austria for Charles II of Spain
- Language: Latin

The Treaty of Madrid, also known as the Godolphin Treaty, was a treaty between England and Spain that was agreed to in July 1670 "for the settlement of all disputes in America". The treaty officially ended the war begun in 1654 in the Caribbean in which England had conquered Jamaica.

The 1670 Treaty of Madrid was highly favourable to England, as its adverse possession in the Caribbean Sea and the rest of the Americas was confirmed and made legal by Spain. Before 1670, Spain had exclusively regarded the Americas as Spanish territory with the exception of Brazil, which was Portuguese according to the 1494 Treaty of Tordesillas that had confirmed Christopher Columbus' claim of the New World for Spain since 12 October 1494.

== Background ==
The Anglo-Spanish War had begun in late 1654, as England joined France in its conflict with Spain. In Europe, the conflict ended with the Treaty of the Pyrenees (between France and Spain) and King Charles II of England's restoration in 1660, but a treaty between England and Spain was never signed. The conflict in the Caribbean began with the English failed attempt on Hispaniola, followed by a successful invasion of Jamaica. The region thus remained in a state of war, and privateer raids were launched on the Spanish Main led by buccaneers notably Christopher Myngs and Henry Morgan under the behest of Jamaican Governor Thomas Modyford As far as Modyford was concerned, Jamaica would never be secure until Spain had acknowledged England's possession of Jamaica and the Cayman Islands and in a treaty. In 1667 the Treaty of Madrid was signed between England and Spain. Although favourable to the former in terms of trade, there was no mention of the American colonies or the Caribbean as rightful possessions. Attacks, therefore, continued, notably Morgan's brutal attack and sackings of Portobello and Lake Maracaibo over the next two years.

In 1669, Mariana, the Queen Regent of Spain, in response ordered attacks on English shipping in the Caribbean. Charles II ordered Modyford to issue official letters of marque against the Spanish. Modyford commissioned Morgan once more to raid the Spanish Main. Spain was politically, economically and militarily weak after years of war and political infighting. Charles saw an opportunity that he could not miss and felt the time was right to negotiate a treaty with Spain since England held a great advantage. The only way Spain could be at an advantage was to recapture Jamaica or France and Holland to join in a potential war, which Charles was seeking to avoid.

Negotiations began in the autumn of 1669 between the Spanish representative Gaspar de Bracamonte, Count of Peñaranda, with William Godolphin, Envoy Extraordinary from England.

The original language of the treaty was in Latin, and the complete English title was "A treaty for the composing of differences, restraining of depredations, and establishing of peace in America, between the crowns of Great Britain and Spain, concluded at Madrid the 8/18 day of July, in the year of our Lord 1670".

== Terms ==
Spain recognised in Article VII that territory in the Americas settled by England belonged to England. From the Spanish position, it accepted as applicable the legal doctrine of adverse possession. Before the 17th century, Spain had considered the Western Hemisphere exclusively as Spanish territory with the exception of Brazil.

Article VII. All offences, damages, losses, injuries, which the Nations and People of Great Britain and Spain have at anytime heretofore, upon what cause and pretext soever, suffered by each other in America, shall be expunged out of remembrance and buried in oblivion, as if no such thing had ever past. Moreover, it is agreed, that the Most Serene King of Great Britain, his Heirs and Successors, shall have, hold, keep, and enjoy for ever, with plenary right of Sovereignty, Dominion, Possession, and Propriety, all those Lands, Regions, Islands, Colonies, and places whatsoever, being situated in the West Indies, or in any part of America, which the said King of Great Britain and his Subjects do at present hold and possess, so as that in regard thereof, or upon any colour or pretence whatsoever, nothing more may or ought to be urged, nor any question or controversy be ever moved concerning the same hereafter.

Under the terms of the treaty, all letters of reprisal were revoked by Spain, and reciprocal aid to ships in distress along with permission to repair in each others ports were required.

England agreed to suppress piracy in the Caribbean, and in return, Spain agreed to permit English ships freedom of movement. Both agreed to refrain from trading in the other's Caribbean territory and to limit trading to their own possessions.

The treaty was then ratified on 28 September.

== Consequences ==
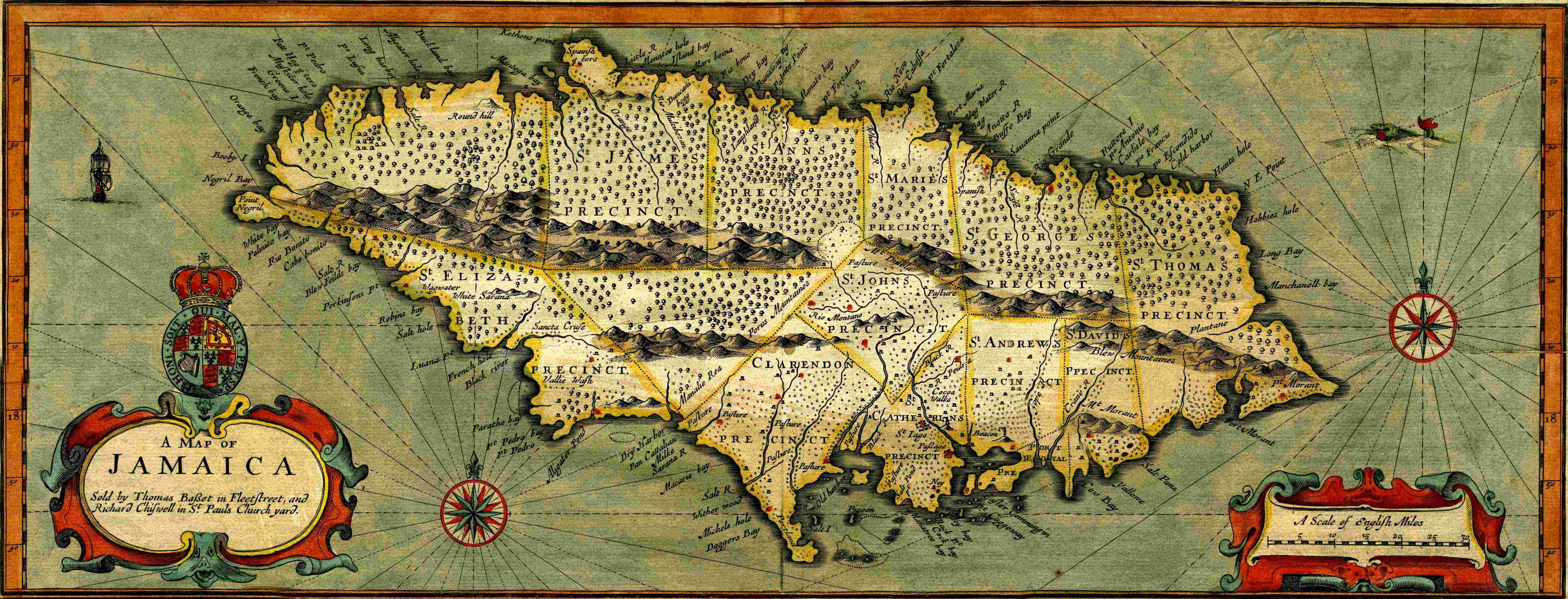
Map of Jamaica from the 1670s

In Spain and its colonies, the treaty was hated and viewed by many as a humiliating surrender. Spain's military, economic and political weakness meant that it was unable to pose any will, which England had taken easy advantage of. Spanish merchants in particular were unwilling to accept the treaty, and the Spanish crown had to give special tax Cédulas as compensation.

The treaty was highly favourable to England, on the other hand, and the fact that Spain recognised England's colonies in the Americas was a major concession. In previous treaties, Spain had always insisted that the New World west of Brazil belonged to it alone.

England effectively challenged Spain in the western Caribbean, and subsequently used Jamaica as a base to support settlements all along the Central American Caribbean coast from the Yucatán to (present day) Nicaragua. The new logwood stations there were accepted by Spain but were not recognised and this increased as many ex privateers turned to logwooding. As such, the treaty did not establish any boundaries: Spain and England only adopted, in Article 7, the principle of actual possession. In Northern America, "this compact legalized England's ownership as far south as Charleston, and Spain's as far north as Santa Elena Sound, in 32°, 30' north latitude". As a result, it was met with consternation by the Spanish in Florida, who, despite protests, had to accept the newly encroached English colony of Charleston.

Although piracy was suppressed, English ships were now able to roam the Caribbean without hindrance. England had sought that in negotiations with Spain in 1655, but the Spanish had refused. Spain's acquiescence reversed its previous position that defined any English person in the West Indies as an intruder or a pirate.

News of the treaty, however, did not reach the Caribbean in time for Henry Morgan, who on 28 January 1671 launched a devastating raid on Panama City. The Spanish were furious, and the English saw that Morgan and Modyford had violated the treaty. To restore relations, both Modyford and Morgan were recalled and arrested. They went unpunished, however, and were released. Morgan was even knighted by Charles and made Lieutenant Governor of Jamaica.

Spain and England remained at peace until 1702 with the War of the Spanish Succession.

== Bibliography ==
- Allen, H. R (1976). Buccaneer: Admiral Sir Henry Morgan. Arthur Baker. ISBN 978-0-213-16569-7.
- Davenport, Frances Gardiner; Paullin, Charles Oscar, eds. (2004). European Treaties Bearing on the History of the United States and Its Dependencies: Issue 254. The Lawbook Exchange, Ltd. ISBN 9781584774228.
- Ehrengardt, Thibault (2015). The History of Jamaica from 1494 to 1838. Dread Editions. ISBN 9791094341018.
- Grady, Timothy Paul (2015). Anglo-Spanish Rivalry in Colonial South-East America, 1650–1725 Empires in Perspective. Routledge. ISBN 9781317323853.
- McAlister, Lyle N. (1984). Spain and Portugal in the New World, 1492-1700, Volume 3. University of Minnesota Press. ISBN 9780816612161.
- Mirza, Rocky M. (2007). The Rise and Fall of the American Empire: A Re-Interpretation of History, Economics and Philosophy: 1492-2006. Trafford Publishing. ISBN 9781425113834.
- Padrón, Francisco Morales (2003). Spanish Jamaica. Ian Randle Publishers. ISBN 9780974215501.
- Pestana, Carla Gardina (2017). The English Conquest of Jamaica: Oliver Cromwell's Bid for Empire. Harvard University Press. ISBN 9780674737310.
- Stein, Stanley J.; Stein, Barbara H. (2000). Silver, Trade, and War: Spain and America in the Making of Early Modern Europe. JHU Press. ISBN 9780801861352.
- Sankey, Margaret (2006). Francis, John Michael (ed.). Iberia and the Americas: Culture, Politics, and History : a Multidisciplinary Encyclopedia, Volume 1. ABC-CLIO. ISBN 9781851094219.
- Talty, Stephan (2007). Empire of Blue Water: Henry Morgan and the Pirates Who Ruled the Caribbean Waves. London: Simon & Schuster. ISBN 978-1-4165-0293-7.
- Walton, Timothy R. (2002). The Spanish Treasure Fleets. Pineapple Press Inc. ISBN 9781561642618.
