= Treaty of Madrid (1667) =

Neutrality and commercial agreement between England and Spain

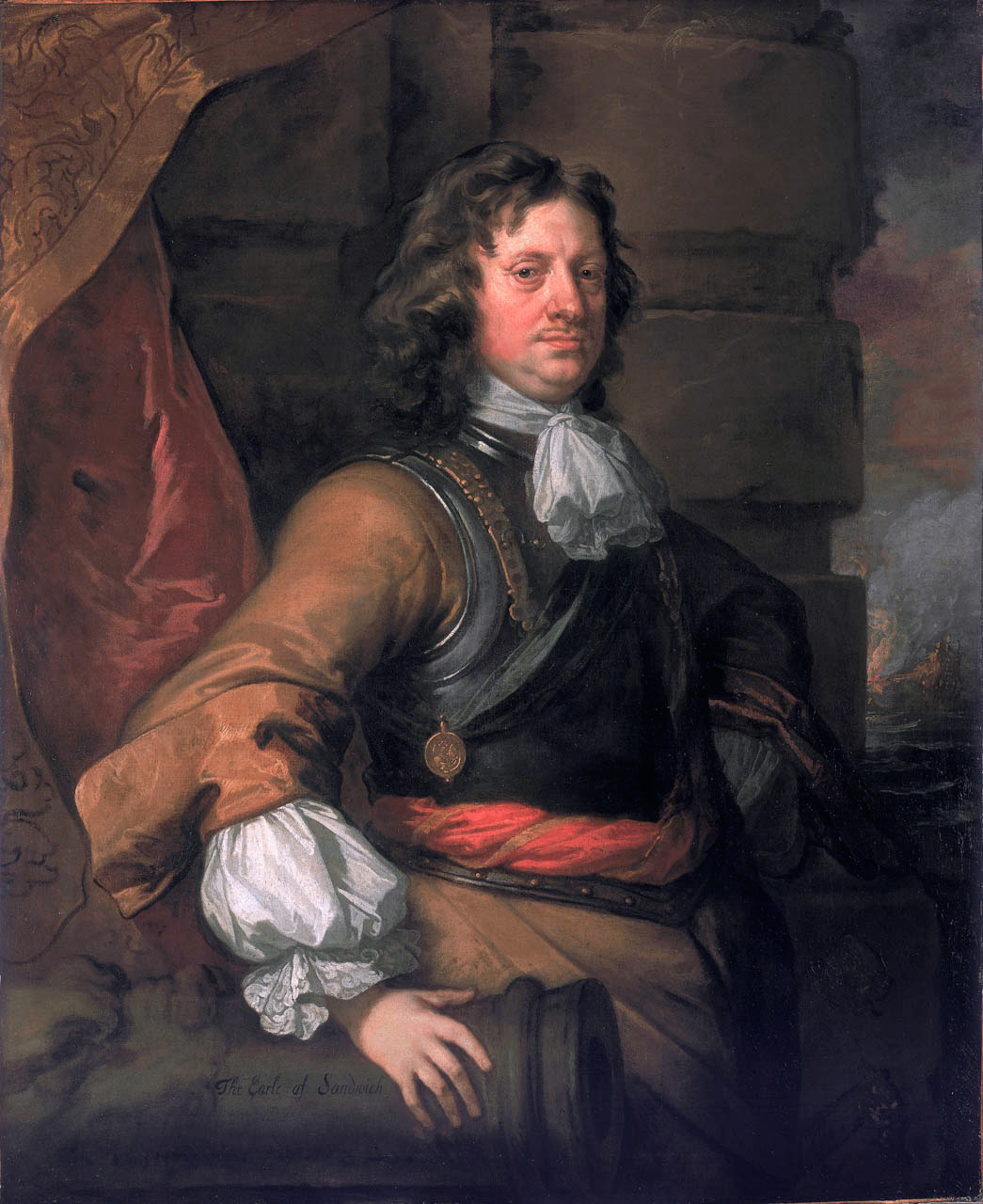
- Edward Montagu, Earl of Sandwich
- Context: Spain and England undertake not to assist enemies of the other; England agrees to mediate an end to the Portuguese Restoration War; Spain awards England commercial privileges
- Signed: 23 May 1667
- Location: Madrid
- Condition: 21 September 1667
- Negotiators: (Kingdom of England) Sir Richard Fanshawe (Kingdom of England) Earl of Sandwich (Spain) Medina Sidonia (Spain) Juan Nithard
- Signatories: (Kingdom of England) Earl of Sandwich (Spain) Count Peñaranda (Spain) Count Oñate
- Parties: England; Spain
- Ratifiers: (Kingdom of England) Charles II of England; Mariana of Austria for Charles II of Spain
- Language: Latin

The Treaty of Madrid, also known as the Earl of Sandwich's Treaty, was signed on 23 May, 1667 by England and Spain. It was one of a series of agreements made in response to French expansion under King Louis XIV.

The parties agreed to commercial terms allowing English merchants trading privileges within the Spanish Empire that remained in place until superseded by the Treaty of Utrecht in 1714. They undertook not to assist each other's enemies, and England also agreed to mediate an end to the 1640-1668 Portuguese Restoration War, which resulted in the 1668 Treaty of Lisbon between Spain and Portugal.

The issue of Spanish possessions captured by England in the Anglo-Spanish War (1654-1660) was settled by the 1670 Treaty of Madrid.

== Background ==
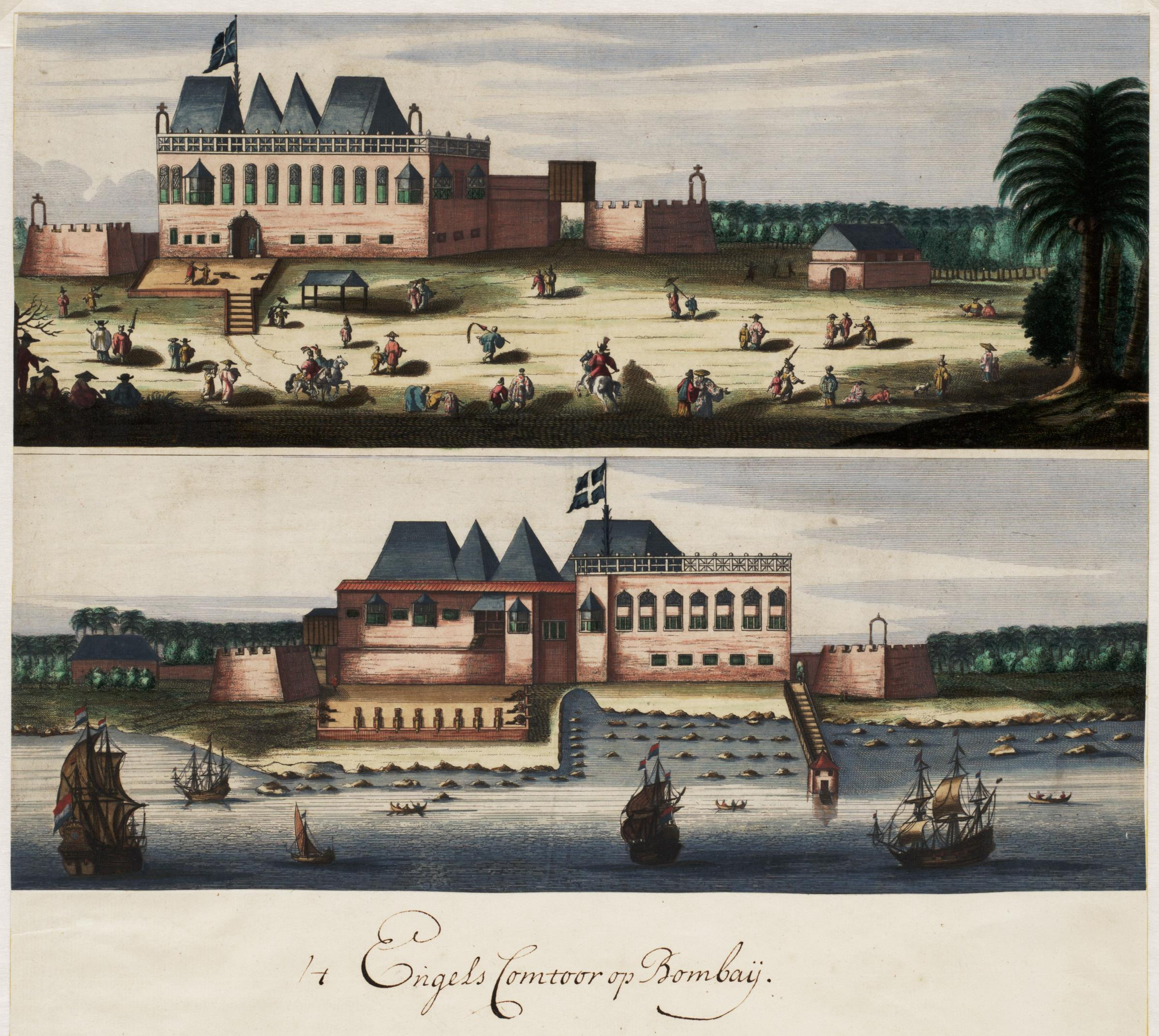
Bombay, c. 1665; acquired by Charles II's marriage to Catherine of Braganza, which disrupted Anglo-Spanish relations

The treaty was one of a series of agreements signed between 1662 and 1668 that were driven by changes in the European balance of power. They included the weakening of the relationship between France and the Dutch Republic, which had been allies during the Eighty Years' War, and Spain's eclipse by France under King Louis XIV.

By the mid-17th century, the Spanish Empire remained a huge global confederation but needed peace after a century of continuous warfare. The Franco-Spanish War of (1635-1659) concluded with the Treaty of the Pyrenees, and the Anglo-Spanish War (1654-1660), involving the Commonwealth of England, was suspended after the Restoration of Charles II in 1660.

Spain now focused on ending the long-running Portuguese Restoration War. In 1656, Philip IV agreed to help Charles regain his throne in return for assistance against Portugal. However, in May 1661, Charles agreed to marry Catherine of Braganza and to provide Portugal military support.

That was the result of various factors, one being Philip's insistence on the return of Jamaica, captured in 1656, and Dunkirk, captured in 1658. The latter had been part of the Spanish Netherlands, but Charles sold it to France in 1662. Relinquishing Jamaica was viewed with great hostility in England, where the English Parliament voted to annex it in September 1660. English merchants gained access to Portuguese markets in Brazil, Africa and the Far East. The acquisition of Tangier and Bombay provided bases in the Mediterranean and on the Surat coast. That made it too attractive to refuse although the issue impacted Anglo-Spanish relations.

== Negotiations ==
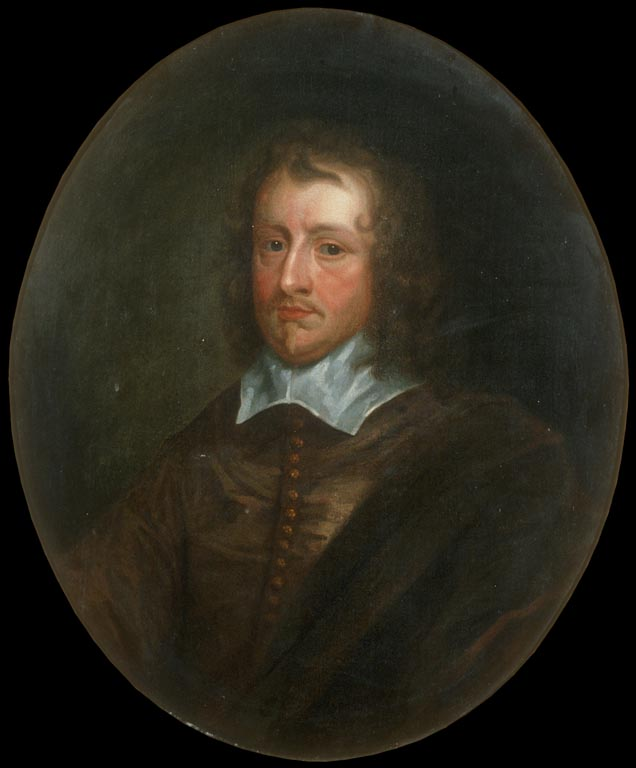
Sir Richard Fanshawe, the English ambassador in Lisbon (1662–1666) and Madrid (1664–1666) had his negotiations become the basis of the 1667 treaty.

Sir Richard Fanshawe, English ambassador in Portugal from 1662 to 1666, was also appointed ambassador to Spain in 1664. He was instructed to agree a treaty of commerce, obtain reparations for losses and confirm possession of territories captured from 1654 to 1660, primarily Jamaica.

In 1663, Philip launched a major military offensive against Portugal and refused to negotiate while England was assisting "rebels". Talks opened in 1664 since the offensive failed, halted once the Second Anglo-Dutch War began in March 1665 and restarted after the Spanish defeat at the Battle of Montes Claros in June. Philip died in September, leaving his three-year-old son, Charles II, as king, and his wife, Mariana of Austria, as regent.

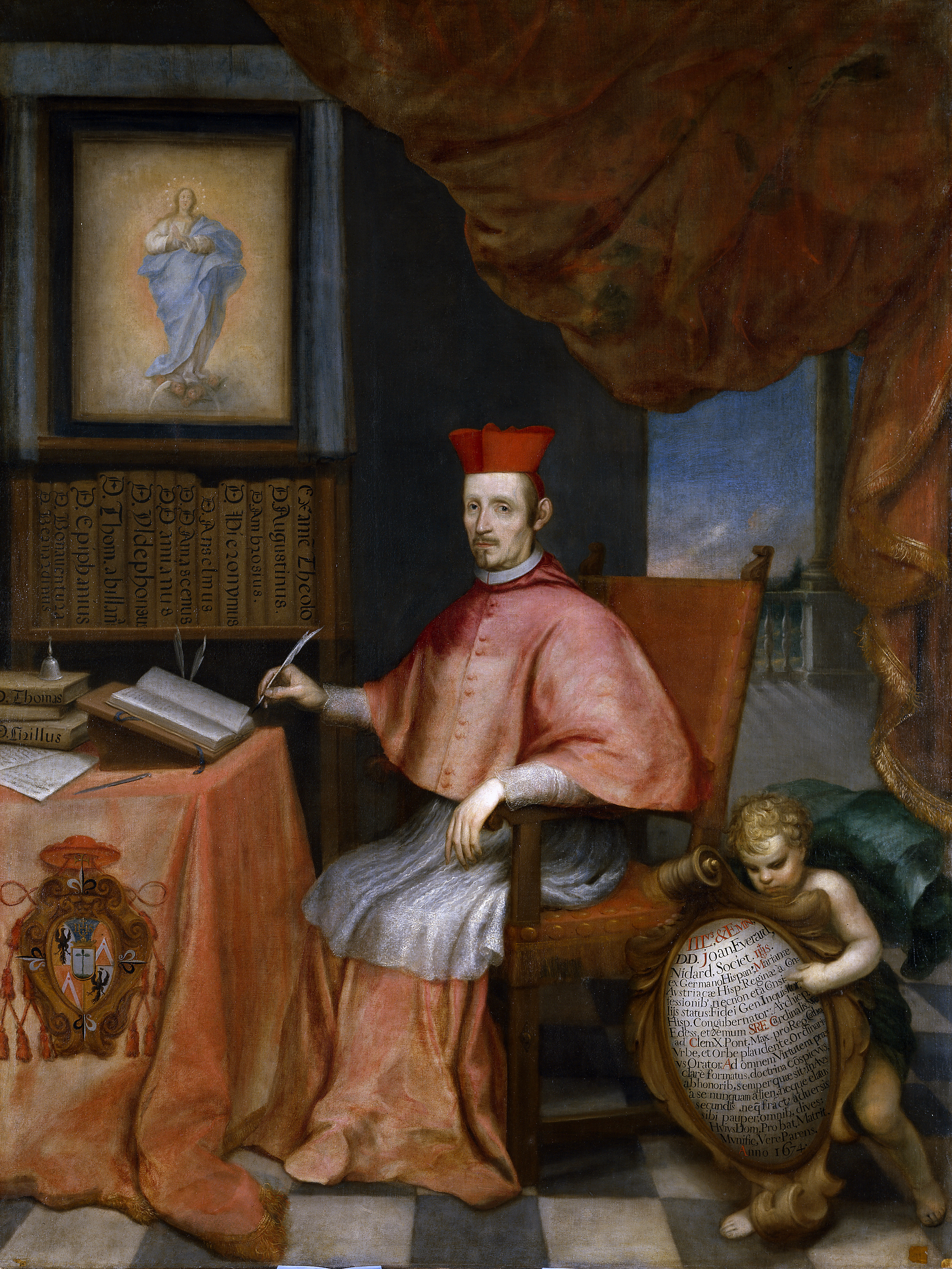
Juan Nithard, Spanish chief minister

Ending the war against Portugal was a priority for the new Spanish government, and Juan Everardo Nithard made an Anglo-Spanish treaty dependent on English help in achieving that. However, Louis encouraged Portugal to insist on harsh terms, seeking to prevent Spain from reinforcing the Spanish Netherlands.

In December, Fanshawe finalised terms with Count Peñaranda, a member of the Spanish Regency Council, by using the 1630 Treaty of Madrid as a base. They were unaware of discussions in London between the Spanish ambassador, Count Molina, the Duke of York and Arlington. Charles refused to ratify Fanshawe's version, claimed that he had exceeded instructions and replaced him with Lord Sandwich. Fanshawe died in June 1666, shortly before he could return home.

In March 1667, France and Portugal signed the Treaty of Lisbon, a ten-year offensive and defensive alliance against Spain. On 24 May, French troops entered the Spanish Netherlands in the War of Devolution. Facing the prospect of years of war with Portugal and the loss of its provinces to France, Spain now quickly came to terms.

== Terms ==
The prominence of commercial issues in diplomacy in the 17th and the 18th centuries derived from the economic theory of mercantilism, which viewed global trade as finite. Increasing a country's share meant taking it from others and so states protected their own by tariffs, import bans and attacks on others' colonies or ships. English complaints related to two areas; exclusion from markets within the Spanish Empire, and restrictions on direct trade between mainland Spain and England.

The 1630 treaty was annulled and, on 23 May 1667, England and Spain signed two new treaties: a commercial deal and an agreement by England to mediate a truce between Portugal and Spain. In a separate article, each party undertook not to assist enemies of the other. England would withdraw its Portuguese expeditionary force, and Spain would remain neutral in the Anglo-Dutch War.

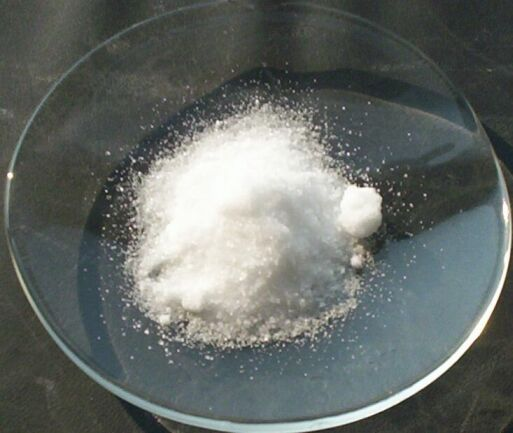
Saltpetre; used in gunpowder, it was hugely profitable for the East India Company, a major beneficiary of the treaty

The commercial treaty consisted of 40 separate articles, the most important being Article Seven, part of Fanshawe's draft but omitted from the original terms. English merchants were given equal status with the Dutch and granted the right to import goods tax free into European Spain. Articles Seven, Eight, Eleven and Twelve went further than this, by allowing English colonies in North America and the East India Company to ship goods directly to Spanish ports.

By granting English merchants trading rights within Spanish America, the treaty accepted England's presence in the Caribbean and occupation of Jamaica, but that was not formally recognised until 1670. Article Ten broadly exempted English ships and warehouses in Spanish ports from customs inspections, with disputes being referred to a local judge nominated by the English and confirmed by Madrid.

Articles Fourteen to Seventeen allowed English ships access to ports throughout the Spanish Empire, a significant concession since it greatly increased their operating range. Article Thirty-Eight made English merchants equivalent to the Dutch and French by awarding them most favoured nation status. Its implementation was resisted by Spanish merchants and had to be reiterated in the 1670 Treaty.

Those concessions were the first step in challenging Dutch economic supremacy outside Europe and so had greater significance than is often appreciated. They remained in place until the outbreak of the War of the Spanish Succession in 1701.

== Consequences ==
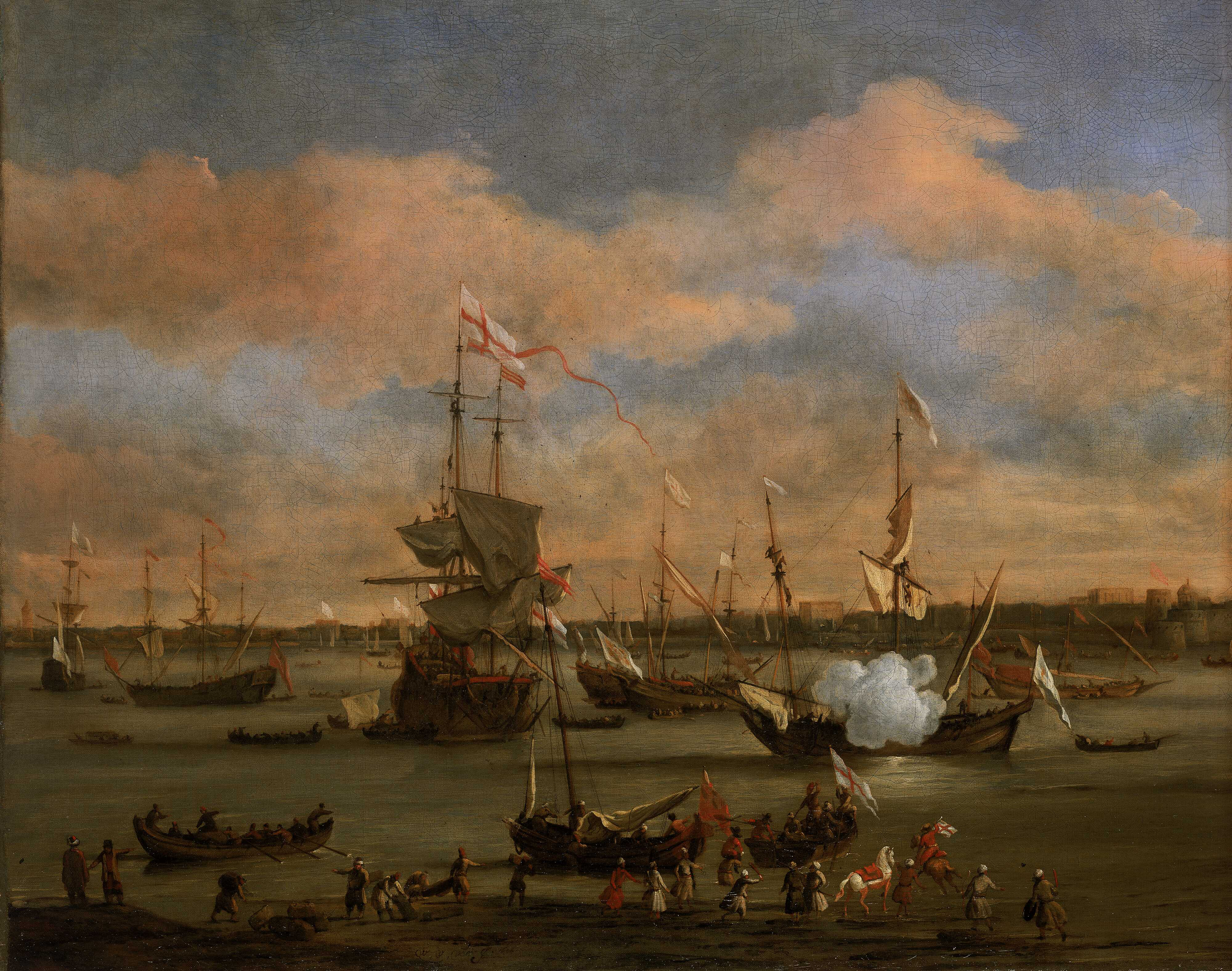
English ship in harbour, c. 1680; the treaty allowed access to ports throughout the Spanish Empire.

The treaty was highly favourable to England; the conditions established for their commercial dealings in Spain were more extensive, more detailed and more favourable than those obtained by the French. This benefited the English given the structural gap in the balance of bilateral trade. The economic historian Guillermo Pérez Sarrión claims that the 1667 treaty demonstrated "England's absolute dominance of Anglo-Spanish trade". One London merchant later described it as "the best flower in our garden". English goods were imported through Cádiz and sold locally or re-exported to the colonies. Spanish dye and wool went the other way.

Franco-Spanish trade primarily consisted of bulk imports like grain and timber, which were easily regulated by local authorities. English trade was predominantly maritime, within the vast Spanish Empire, and much harder to control. The treaty effectively permitted ships captains to decide what goods were listed on their manifest as "English". That allowed English merchants to evade customs duties since demand from Spanish colonists created a large and extremely profitable black market.

In September, Afonso VI of Portugal was deposed in a coup led by his brother Pedro. The previous treaty with France was annulled, and with England as mediator, Spain and Portugal signed the Treaty of Lisbon on 13 February 1668. Relieved of that burden and backed by the Triple Alliance, Spain ended the War of Devolution with France by agreeing to the Treaty of Aix-la-Chapelle on 5 May.

The question of Spanish possessions in the West Indies captured by England in the previous war was settled in the 1670 Treaty of Madrid.

== Sources ==
- Andrien, Kenneth J; Kuethe, Allan J (2014). The Spanish Atlantic World in the Eighteenth Century: War and the Bourbon Reforms, 1713–1796. Cambridge University Press. ISBN 9781107043572.
- Belcher, Gerald (1975). "Spain and the Anglo-Portuguese Alliance of 1661: A Reassessment of Charles II's Foreign Policy at the Restoration". British Studies. 15 (1): 67–88. doi:10.1086/385679. JSTOR 175239. S2CID 144939720.
- Cowans, Jon (2003). Modern Spain: A Documentary History. U. of Pennsylvania Press. ISBN 0-8122-1846-9.
- Davenport, Frances Gardiner; Paullin, Charles Oscar, eds. (1917). European Treaties Bearing on the History of the United States and Its Dependencies, Vol. 2: 1650-1697 (2018 ed.). Forgotten Books. ISBN 978-0483158924.
- Feiling, Keith (2013). British Foreign Policy 1660-1972. Routledge. ISBN 9781136241543.
- Fisher, Margaret Anne; Savelle, Max (1967). The origins of American diplomacy: the international history of Angloamerica, 1492-1763 American diplomatic history series Authors. Macmillan.
- Geyl, P (1936). "Johan de Witt, Grand Pensionary of Holland, 1653–72". History. 20 (80): 303–319. doi:10.1111/j.1468-229X.1936.tb00103.x. JSTOR 24401084.
- Israel, Jonathan (1989). Dutch Primacy in World Trade, 1585–1740 (1990 ed.). Oxford University Press. ISBN 978-0198211396.
- Lockey, Brian C (2016). Early Modern Catholics, Royalists, and Cosmopolitans: English Transnationalism and the Christian Commonwealth Transculturalisms, 1400-1700. Routledge. ISBN 9781317147107.
- Lodge, Richard (1932). "Presidential Address: Sir Benjamin Keene, K.B.: A Study in Anglo-Spanish Relations in the Earlier Part of the Eighteenth Century". Transactions of the Royal Historical Society. 15: 1–43. doi:10.2307/3678642. JSTOR 3678642. S2CID 163640610.
- Mclachlan, Jean O (1940). Trade and Peace with Old Spain (2015 ed.). Cambridge University Press. ISBN 978-1107585614.
- McLachlan, Jean (1934). "Documents Illustrating Anglo-Spanish Trade between the Commercial Treaty of 1667 and the Commercial Treaty and the Asiento Contract of 1713". Cambridge Historical Journal. 4 (3): 299–311. doi:10.1017/S1474691300000664. JSTOR 3020673.
- Newitt, Malyn (2004). A History of Portuguese Overseas Expansion 1400–1668. Routledge. ISBN 9781134553044.
- Richmond, Herbert (1920). The Navy in the War of 1739-48 - War College Series (2015 ed.). War College Series. ISBN 978-1296326296.
- Riley, Jonathon (2014). The Last Ironsides: The English Expedition to Portugal, 1662-1668. Helion & Company. ISBN 978-1909982208.
- Sarrion, Guillermo Perez (2016). The Emergence of a National Market in Spain, 1650-1800: Trade Networks, Foreign Powers and the State. Bloomsbury Publishing. ISBN 9781472586469.
- Stein, Stanley J; Stein, Barbara H (2000). Silver, Trade, and War: Spain and America in the Making of Early Modern Europe. JHU Press. ISBN 9780801861352.
