= Siege of Lille =

There have been several sieges of Lille:

- Siege of Lille (1667) during the War of Devolution
- Siege of Lille (1708) during the War of the Spanish Succession
- Siege of Lille (1792) during the French Revolutionary War
- Siege of Lille (1940) during the Second World War
