= Siege of Tournai (1667) =

Siege during the War of Devolution

- Part of the War of Devolution
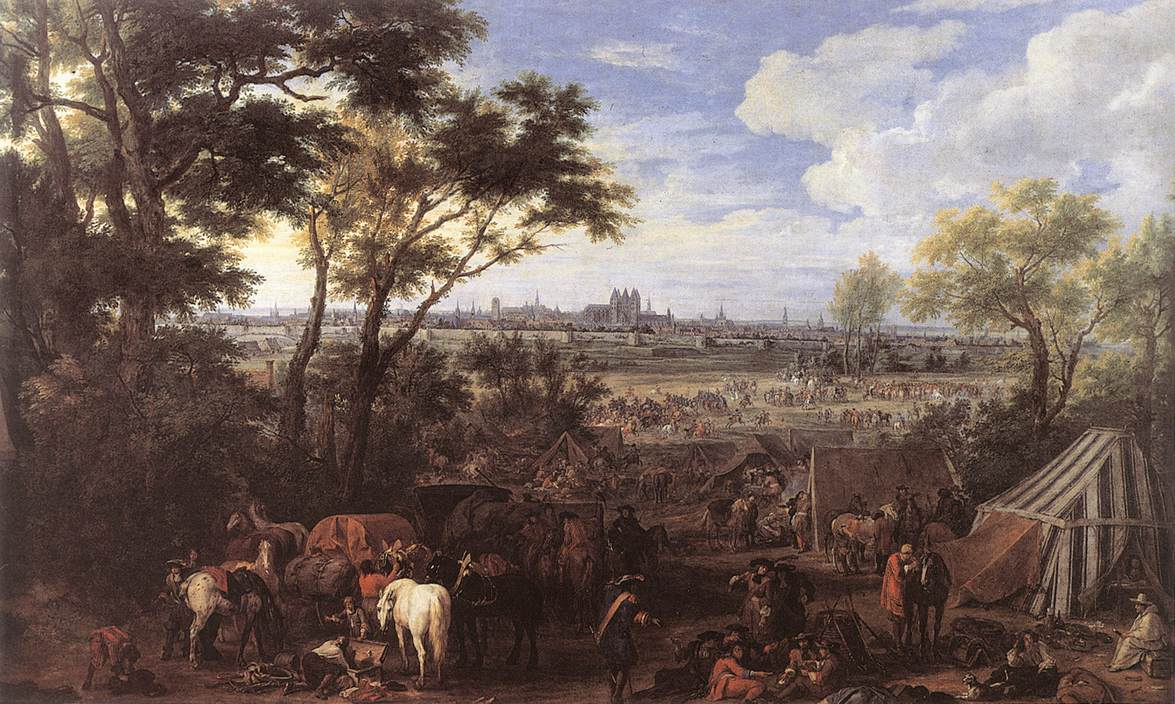
- The Army of Louis XIV in front of Tournai in 1667 by Adam Frans van der Meulen
Date	21 – 26 June 1667
Location	Tournai, Spanish Netherlands 50°36′20″N 03°23′17″E
Result	French victory

Belligerents
France	(Spain) Spanish Empire

Commanders and leaders
(Kingdom of France) Louis XIV (Kingdom of France) Vicomte de Turenne	(Spanish Empire) Marquis de Trazegnies

Strength
35,000	~400 soldiers 4 companies of burghers
- Location of Tournai in modern day Belgium

The siege of Tournai was an event in the War of Devolution. A French army commanded by Louis XIV successfully besieged the town of Tournai, then part of the Spanish Netherlands. The siege, which began on 21 June 1667, led to the surrender of the defenders loyal to the Spanish Empire fewer than five days later.

== Background ==
Louis XIV's initial objective for the campaign season had been to capture Brussels, delivering a single decisive blow to the Spanish. Louis was, however, advised by the Vicomte de Turenne to be more cautious and attack easier objectives closer to the French border. In the summer of 1667, Tournai had obsolete fortifications and was lightly defended by a garrison comprising 230 Irish soldiers and 150 cavalry troops under the command of the Marquis de Trazegnies. Trazegnies also had four companies of burghers to draw upon.

== Siege ==
The French army, commanded by Louis himself, presented itself at the foot of the town's ramparts on 21 June. The following day, a siege trench around the town was dug and occupied by French soldiers. Louis is recorded as having joined his soldiers in the trenches, exposing himself to enemy fire in the process and causing Turenne much anxiety. On 25 June, the town of Tournai surrendered and its fortress capitulated the following day. Trazegnies was permitted to surrender to Louis with the honours of war.

== Aftermath ==
Tournai and its environs were among the territories ceded to France by Spain in the Treaty of Aix-la-Chapelle. Louis ordered the construction of a new citadel in 1667, which was completed in 1674. The new fortifications, built by Guillaume Deshouillères under the supervision of Vauban, were to be put the test in the siege of Tournai in 1709 during the War of the Spanish Succession.
