= Philippe Spinola =

Spanish noble

Philippe Spinola Count of Bruay
- Born: c. 1612
- Died: January 14, 1670; Brussels
- Burial place: Chapel Church, Brussels
- Military career
- Allegiance: Spanish Habsburg
- Service years: 1627–67
- Rank: Captain; Maestre de Campo; sergeant-general
- Unit: Regiment Spinola
- Commands: Colonel of his own regiment; governor of Walloon Flanders 1655–67
- Conflicts: Siege of Lille (1667)

Charles-Hippolyte-Philippe Spinola, known as Philippe Spinola (c. 1612–1670) was count of Bruay, baron of Andre, and lord of Kounice, a lordship which he later exchanged for those of Calonne-sur-la-Lys and Viefville, Grandee of Spain and Knight of the Golden Fleece.

== Life ==
Born in or before 1612, Spinola was the youngest son of Bertin Spinola, Count of Bruay. At the age of 15 he enlisted in the Walloon regiment of Albert de Ligne, Prince of Barbançon, soon coming to command a company of the regiment, and eventually a regiment of his own as Maestre de Campo.

In 1652 he was appointed sergeant-general and in 1655 governor and captain-general of Walloon Flanders. He was the last man to hold this position under the King of Spain. In 1667 Louis XIV besieged Lille and conquered the province. After this defeat Spinola retired from public life. He died on 14 January 1670 after a short illness.
