= Peñaranda de Bracamonte =

- Municipality
- Flag Coat of arms

- Location in Salamanca
- Coordinates: 40°54′6″N 5°11′53″W
- Country: Spain
- Autonomous community: Castile and León
- Province: Salamanca
- Comarca: Tierra de Peñaranda

Government
  - Mayor: Carmen Ávila (PSOE)

Area
  - Total: 23 km^{2} (8.9 sq mi)
- Elevation: 902 m (2,959 ft)

Population (2025-01-01)
  - Total: 6,162
  - Density: 270/km^{2} (690/sq mi)
- Time zone: UTC+1 (CET)
  - Summer (DST): UTC+2 (CEST)
- Postal code: 37300

Peñaranda de Bracamonte is a village and municipality in the province of Salamanca, Western Spain, part of the autonomous community of Castile-Leon. It is located 40 kilometres (25 mi) from the provincial capital city of Salamanca and has a population of 6320 people.

It's the birthplace of Senor Wences, a ventriloquist and a frequent guest on the Ed Sulivan Show.

== History ==
In July 1939, a powder mill in the village exploded reportedly killing 80 people and injuring 1,500.

== Geography ==
The municipality covers an area of 23 km^{2} (8.9 sq mi). It lies 902 metres (2,959 ft) above sea level and the postal code is 37300.

== See also ==
- List of municipalities in Salamanca
