= Treaty of Aix-la-Chapelle (1668) =

1668 peace treaty ending the War of Devolution between France and Spain

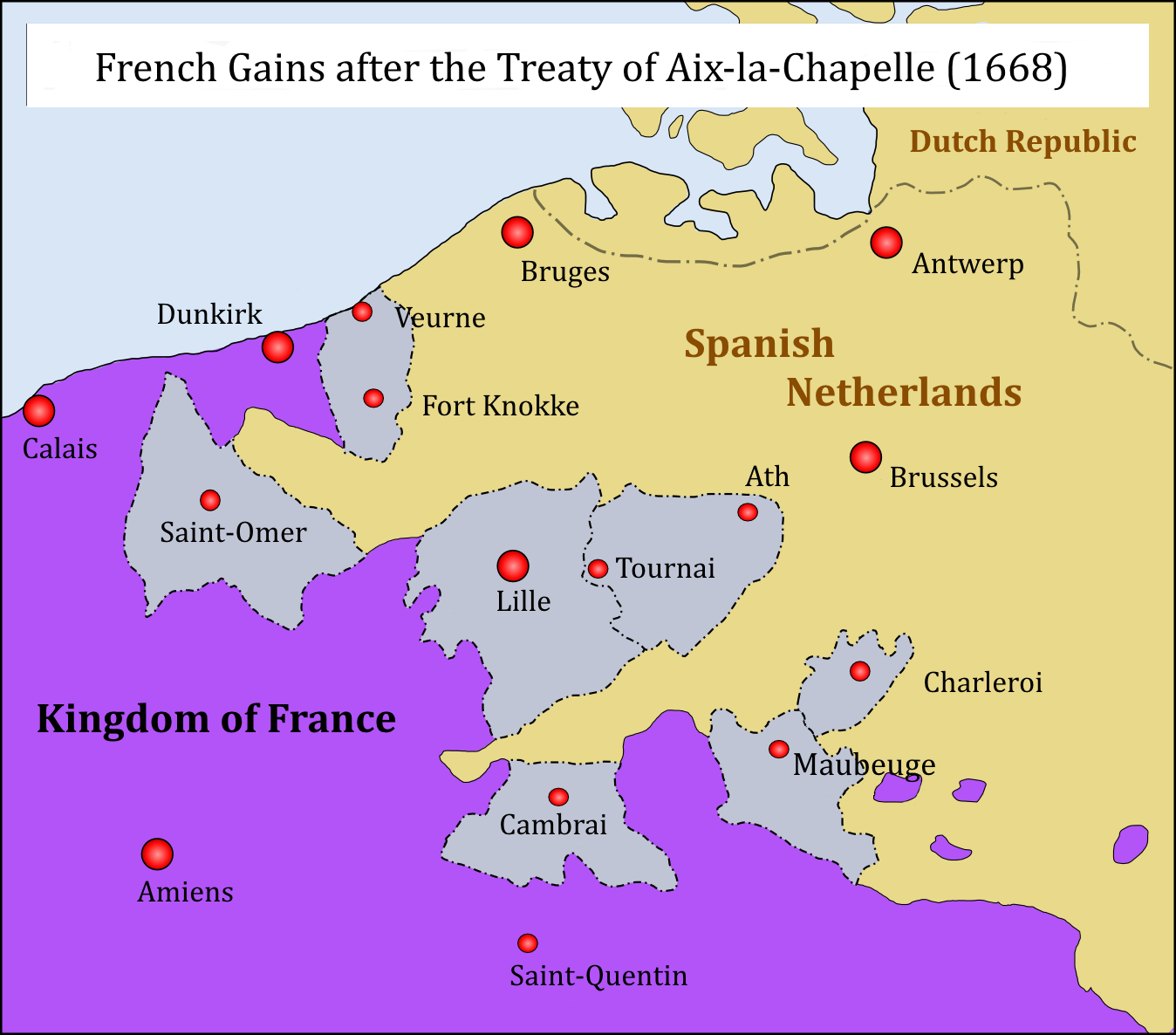
Areas gained and returned by Louis XIV in Aix, 1668

The Treaty of Aix-la-Chapelle or Aachen ended the War of Devolution between France and Spain. It was signed on 2 May 1668 in Aachen (French: Aix-la-Chapelle). Spain acceded on 7 May 1669.

== Terms of the treaty ==
The treaty was mediated and guaranteed by the Triple Alliance of the Dutch Republic, England and Sweden at the First Congress of Aix-la-Chapelle. By the terms of the treaty, Louis XIV returned three cities, Cambrai (Kamerijk), Aire (Ariën aan de Leie), and Saint-Omer (Sint-Omaars) to Spain. He also returned the province of Franche-Comté. On the other hand, he kept Armentières (Armentiers), Bergues (Sint-Winoksbergen), Charleroi, Courtrai (Kortrijk), Douai (Dowaai), Furnes (Veurne), Lille (Rijsel), Oudenarde (Oudenaarde, Audenarde), and Tournai (Doornik). Lille, Armentières, Bergues and Douai were considered essential to reinforce France's vulnerable northern border and remain French to this day, while the retention of Tournai, Oudenarde, Courtrai, Veurne, Binche, Charleroi and Ath were deemed necessary to facilitate future offensives in the Spanish Netherlands and the Dutch Republic.

The treaty left to France all its conquests in Flanders in 1667. This was a vague provision; after the Peace of Nijmegen (1679), Louis XIV took advantage of it to occupy a number of villages and towns he adjudged to be dependencies of the cities and territories acquired in 1668.

== See also ==
- List of treaties
- Treaty of Aix-la-Chapelle (1748)
