= Convent of Santa Úrsula, Toledo =

Augustinian convent in Toledo, Spain

Coordinates: 39.8563°N 4.0263°W

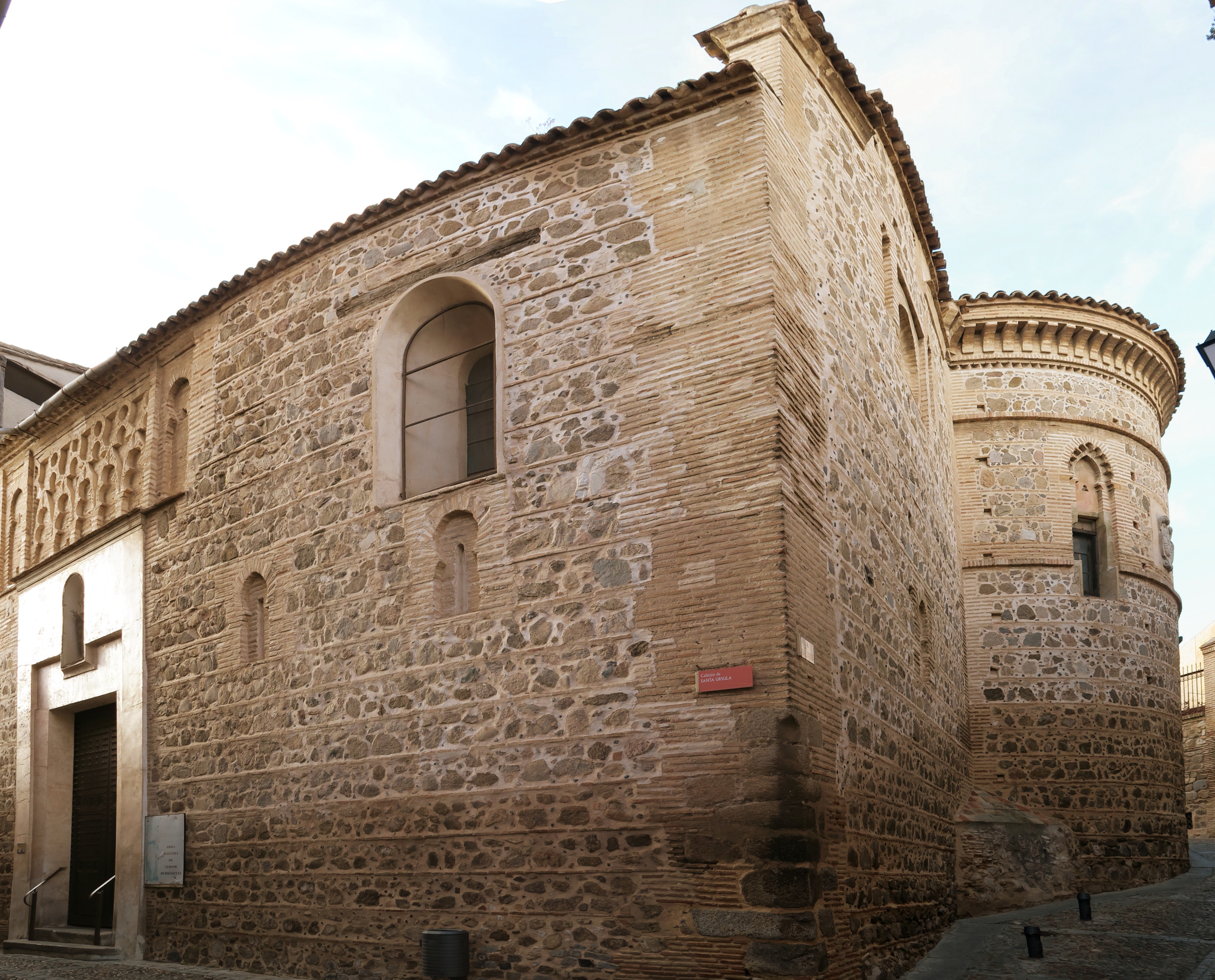
East end of St Ursula's Convent

The Agustinas Ermitañas Convento Santa Úrsula is an Augustinian convent located in the city of Toledo, in Castile-La Mancha, Spain. It was founded in 1259.

The church dates back to 1360 and retains some of the original Mudéjar architecture. It has a reredos made in 1535 by Alonso Berruguete.

== See also ==
- Convent of the Calced Augustinians, Toledo
- Convento de la Purísima Concepción, Toledo
