= Pedro Antonio de Aragón =

Spanish nobleman, military figure, and politician

General Pedro Antonio de Aragón
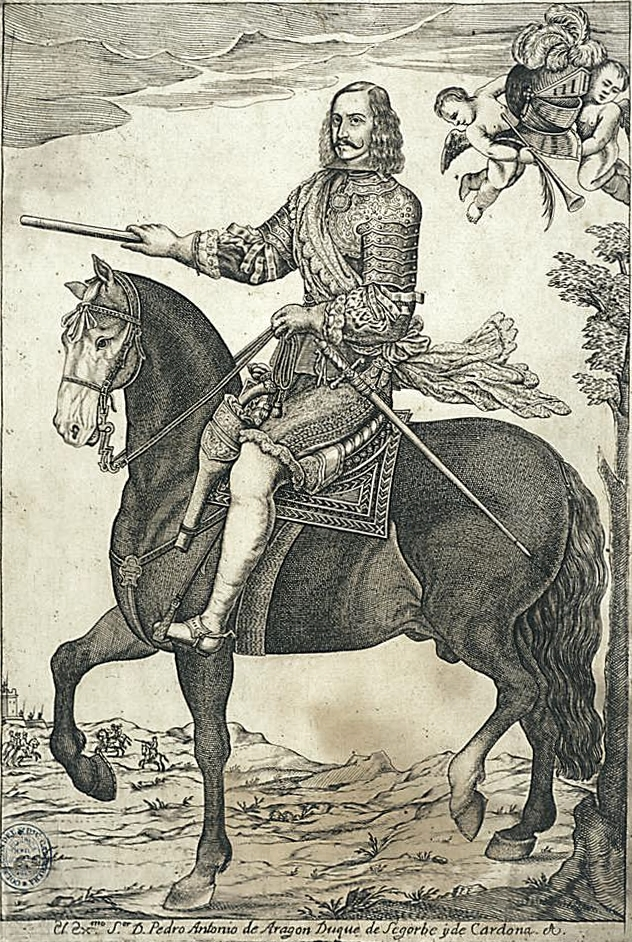
- Pedro Antonio de Aragón.
- Born: Pedro Antonio Ramón Folch de Cardona; 7 November 1611; Lucena, Crown of Castile, Spanish Empire
- Died: 1 September 1690 (aged 78); Madrid, Crown of Castile, Spanish Empire
- Spouse(s): Jerónima de Guzmán-Dávila y Enríquez de Ribera (1629–1641); Ana Fernández de Córdoba y Enríquez de Ribera; Ana Catalina de la Cerda (1680–1690)
- Relatives: Enrique de Aragón Folc de Cardona y Córdoba (father); Catalina Fernández de Córdoba-Figueroa y Enríquez de Ribera (mother)
- Military career
- Allegiance: Spanish Empire
- Branch: (Spain) Spanish Army
- Service years: 1630–1644
- Rank: General
- Conflicts: Franco-Spanish War: Reapers' War; Battle of Montmeló; Battle of La Granada

Viceroy of Catalonia
- In office February 1642 – 1644
- Monarch: Philp IV
- Preceded by: Juan Ramírez de Arellano y Manrique de Lara
- Succeeded by: Andrea Cantelmo

Ambassadors of Spain to the Holy See
- In office 1662–1666
- Monarchs: Philp IV; Charles II
- Regent: Mariana of Austria
- Valido: Juan Everardo Nithard
- Preceded by: Pascual de Aragón
- Succeeded by: Antonio Pedro Sancho Dávila y Osorio

Viceroy of Naples
- In office 16 April 1666 – 1671
- Monarch: Charles II
- Regent: Mariana of Austria
- Preceded by: Pascual de Aragón
- Succeeded by: Fadrique Alvarez de Toledo y Ponce de León

President of the Council of Aragon
- In office 1677–1690
- Monarch: Charles II
- Regent: Mariana of Austria
- Preceded by: Pascual de Aragón
- Succeeded by: Melchor de Navarra

Pedro Antonio de Aragón (7 November 1611 – 1 September 1690) was a Spanish nobleman, military figure and politician who served under Kings Philip IV and Charles II of Spain. He was the brother of Cardinal Pascual de Aragón, Viceroy of Naples, 1664–1666 and the son of Enrique Ramón Folch de Cardona y Córdoba and Catalina Fernández de Córdoba y Figueroa.

He was born in Lucena, in what is now the Province of Córdoba. A cultured and educated man, he held different positions of high importance for the Court, acting as Viceroy of Catalonia from 1642 to 1644, as ambassador in Rome (1664–1666), and Viceroy of Naples (1666–1671), as well as Commander in chief of Catalonia.

He claimed in 1670 the joint titles of 8th Duke of Segorbe, and 9th Duke of Cardona, after the death of his brother Luis Raimundo Folch de Cardona (January 1670) and his infant son Joaquín (March 1670), leaving only 7 daughters.

He was brought before the Justice Courts by two of his nieces and their husbands, but he died in Madrid before the case was solved, creating some problems afterwards with the numbering of the titles of both Dukedoms since then, as apparently he had been too quick claiming "legal", self-appointed, succession to both Dukedoms.

During his period of ten years in Italy (1662–1672), he amassed a personal library of great value. Being one of the protectors and patrons of Poblet Monastery, he donated his library of approximately 3600 volumes in 1677 in exchange for being able to be buried amongst its venerated figures after his death. He sent back to Naples, from the Poblet Monastery, in 1671, the body of king Alfonso V of Aragon.

He was President of the Council of Aragon between 1677 and 1690.
He published a book on Geometria Militar in 1671.

Government offices
Preceded by Pascual de Aragón	Viceroy of Naples; 1666–1671	Succeeded by Fadrique de Toledo y Osorio
