= Pascual de Aragón =

Spanish nobleman and cleric

His Eminence Pascual de Aragón y Córdoba
- Cardinal; Primate of Spain; Archbishop of Toledo
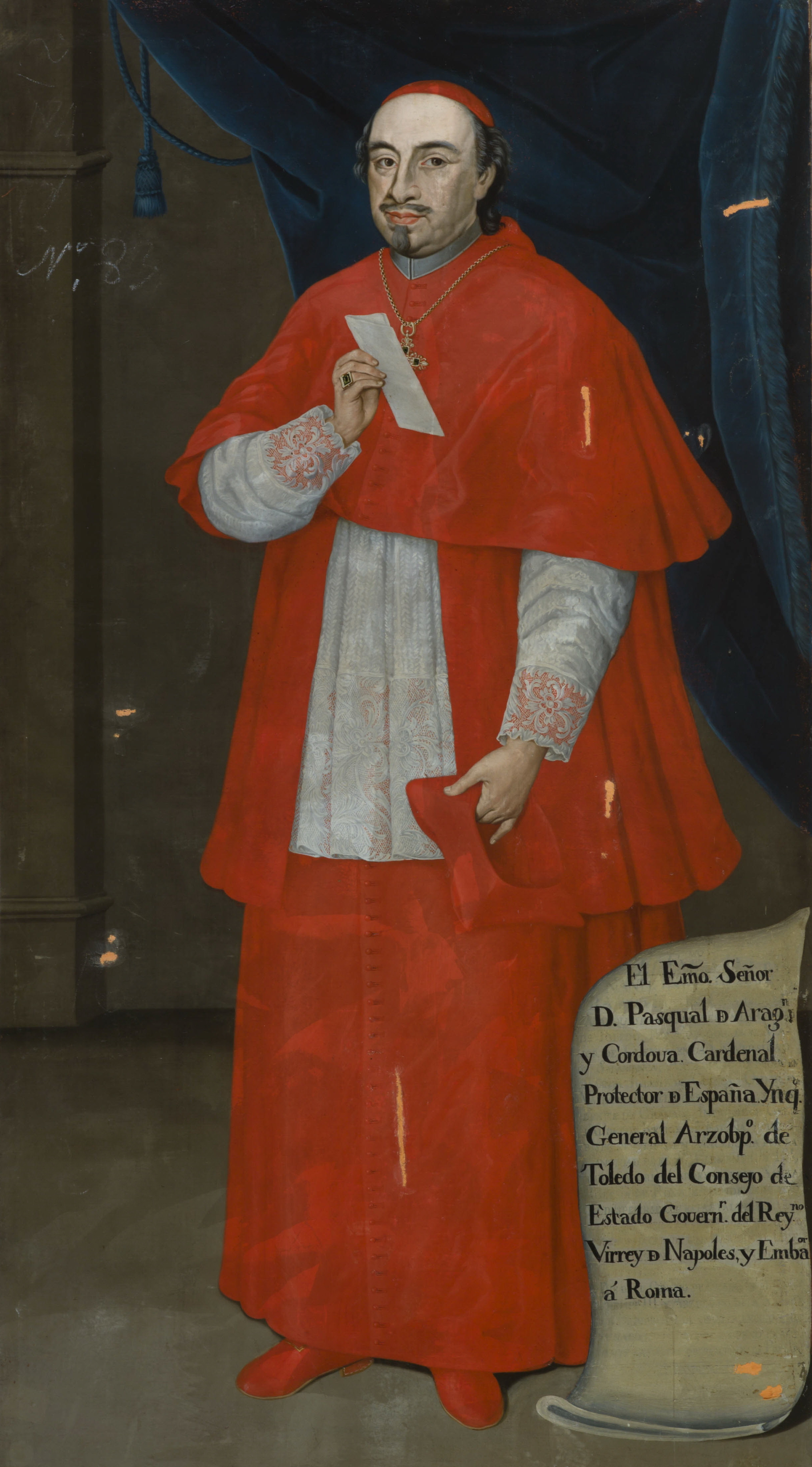
- Church: Roman Catholic
- Archdiocese: Toledo
- See: Cathedral of Saint Mary of Toledo
- Installed: 1 February 1666
- Term ended: 28 September 1677
- Predecessor: Baltasar Moscoso y Sandoval
- Successor: Luis Manuel Fernández de Portocarrero

Personal details
- Born: 11 April 1626 Palau de la Riera, Mataró, Catalonia, Kingdom of Spain
- Died: 28 September 1677 (aged 51) Toledo, Castile–La Mancha, Kingdom of Spain

Pascual de Aragón y Córdoba (11 April 1626 – 28 September 1677) was a Spanish nobleman and cleric. He served as Viceroy of Naples and as Archbishop of Toledo.

== Biography ==
Born in Mataró, Province of Barcelona, as son of Enrique de Aragón Folc de Cardona y Córdoba and Catalina Fernández de Córdoba y Figueroa, Aragón was ordained a priest in 1655. In 1661, aged thirty-five, he was created Cardinal-Priest of Sainte Balbine by Pope Alexander VII. However, he did not participate in the Conclaves held in his lifetime.

In 1664, King Philip IV of Spain appointed him Viceroy of Naples. In 1666, he was replaced by his brother, Pedro Antonio de Aragón, as he was called back to Spain to become Archbishop of Toledo. Aragón had enjoyed the patronage of the previous Archbishop, Baltasar Moscoso y Sandoval, and upon the latter's death in 1665 had been nominated to succeed him. He was installed in Toledo on 1 February 1666.

In 1665, King Philip IV had died as well, leaving the throne to his son Charles II, a weak four-year-old. Upon his appointment as Archbishop, Aragón became president of the Regency Council. When Queen Mariana of Austria promoted her confessor and former tutor, the Austrian Jesuit Juan Everardo Nithard to the position of General Inquisitor in 1666 and thus admitted him to the council, Archbishop Aragón was among those who antagonised him and in 1669 supported John of Austria's military pronunciamiento, which resulted in the Jesuit's dismissal.

He was also appointed President of the Council of Aragon just before his death.
The Archbishop died in 1677 and was buried in the Convent of the Purísima Concepción in Toledo.

Government offices
Preceded by Gaspar de Bracamonte	Viceroy of Naples; 1664–1666	Succeeded by Pedro Antonio de Aragón
Catholic Church titles
Preceded by Diego de Arce y Reinoso	Grand Inquisitor of Spain; 1665	Succeeded by Juan Everardo Nithard
