= Enrique de Aragón Folc de Cardona y Córdoba =

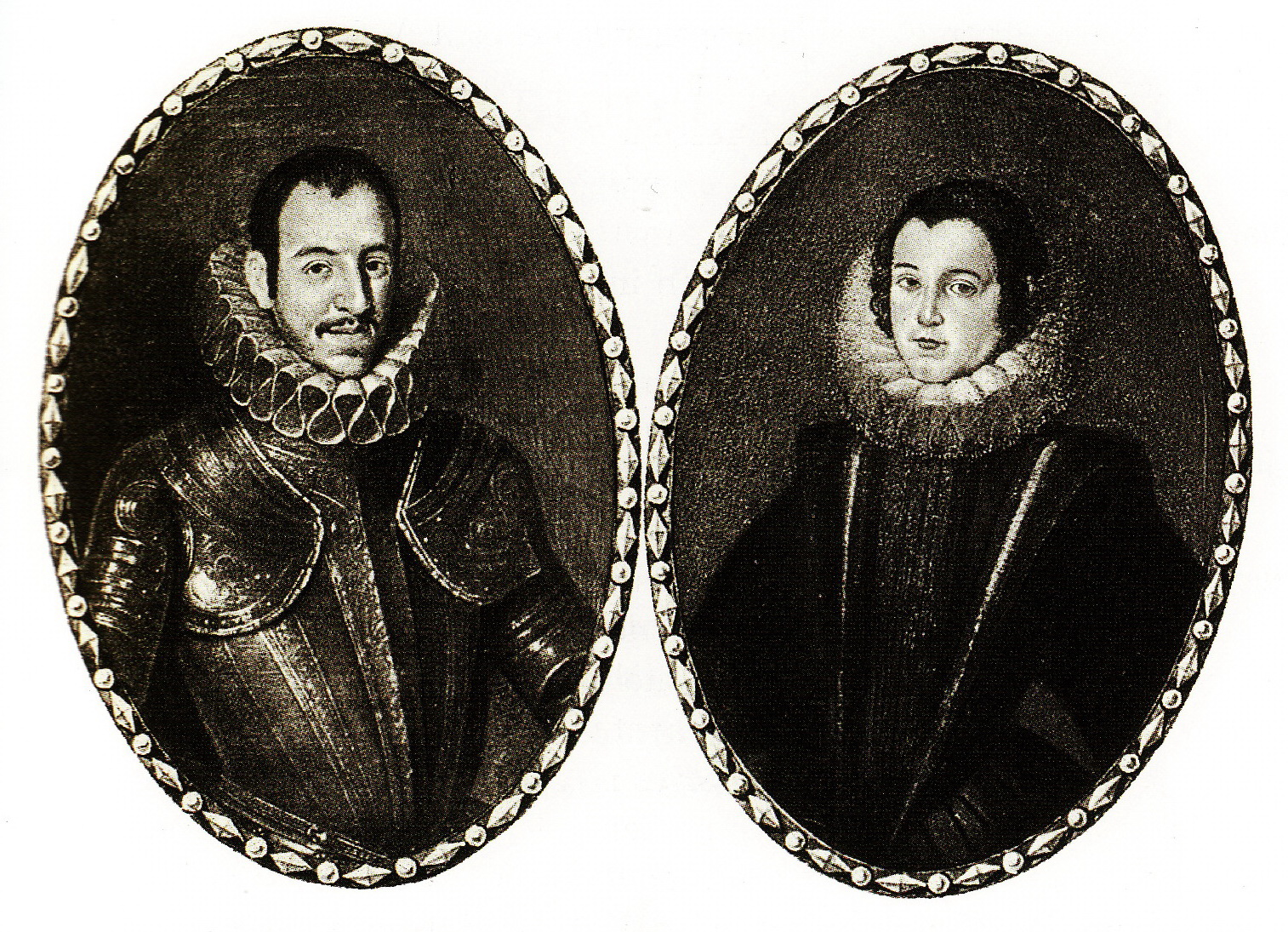
Enrique de Aragón and his wife.

Enrique de Aragón Folc de Cardona y Córdoba (Lucena, 12 August 1588 – Perpignan, 22 July 1640), was 5th Duke of Segorbe, 6th Duke of Cardona and Viceroy of Catalonia.

He was son of Luis Ramón de Aragón Folc de Cardona y Córdoba (died 1596), count of Prades, and Ana Enríquez de Cabrera (died 1607). He inherited the titles of Duke of Segorbe and Duke of Cardona in 1608, after the death of his grandmother Juana de Aragón y Cardona.
He was a Knight and Trece in the Order of Santiago, State Councillor since 1626, president of the Consejo de Órdenes and 3 times viceroy of Catalonia.

== Marriage and children ==
In 1606 he married Catalina Fernández de Córdoba y Figueroa, daughter of the Marquis de Priego. They had 9 children :

- Luis Ramón (1608–1670), 6th Duke of Segorbe, married Mariana de Sandoval y Rojas, Duchess of Lerma. He had 7 daughters including Catalina de Aragón y Sandoval, 8th Duchess of Segorbe, who married Juan Francisco de la Cerda, 8th Duke of Medinaceli.
- Ana Francisca (1609–?), married Rodrigo Ponce de León, 4th Duke of Arcos.
- Catalina (1610–1647), married Luis de Haro, 6th Marquis of Carpio.
- Pedro Antonio (1611–1690), viceroy of Catalonia, viceroy of Naples. No surviving issue.
- Antonio (1616–1650), cardinal In pectore from 1647.
- Vicente Agustín (1620–1676), no issue.
- Pascual (1626–1677), archbishop of Toledo, viceroy of Naples.
- Juana, died young
- Francisca, died young.

== Sources ==
- Real Academia de la Historia
- Fundacion Medinaceli
