= Alonso del Arco =

Spanish painter

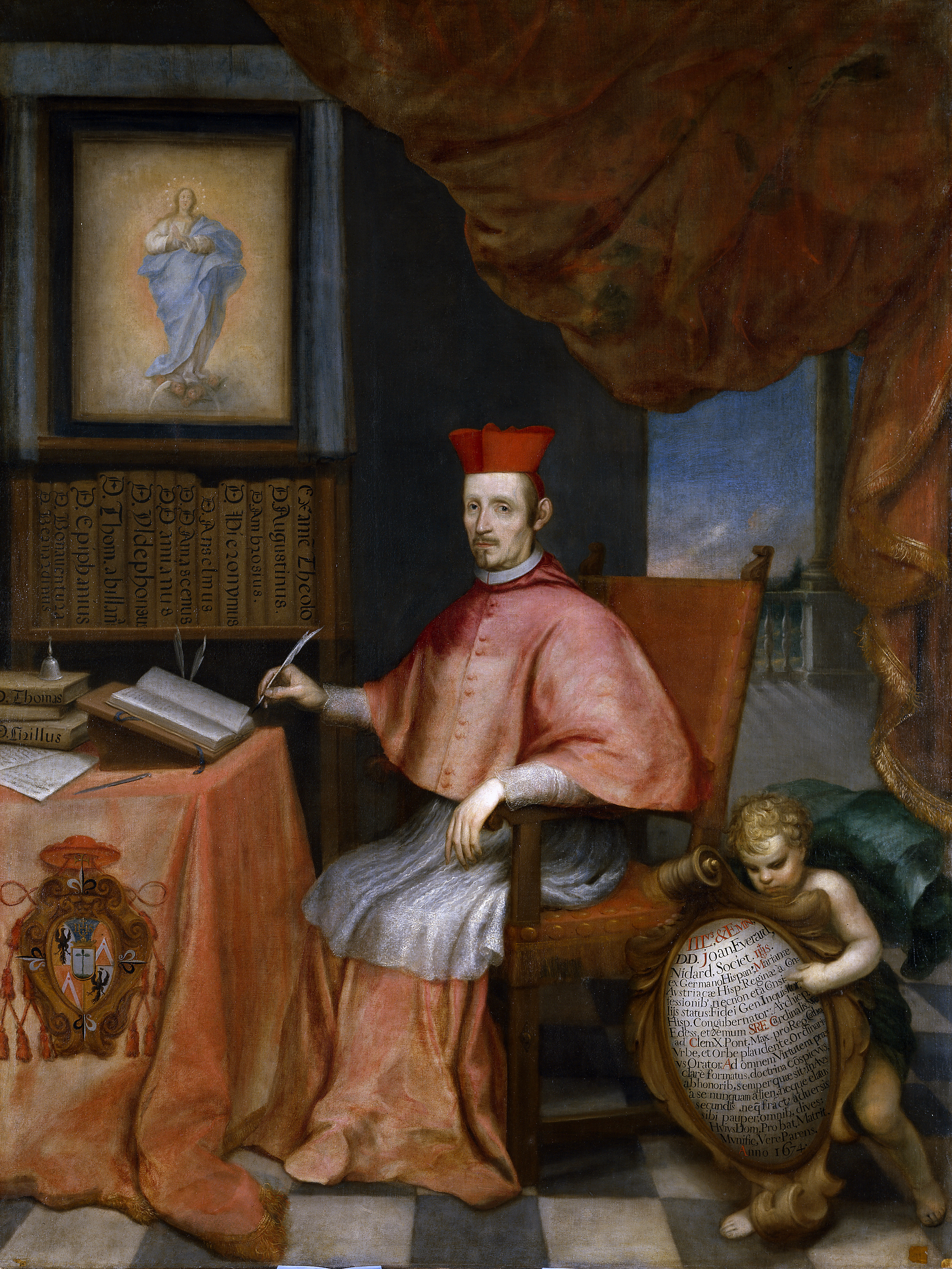
Portrait of Juan Everardo Nithard, 1674, now at the Museo del Prado

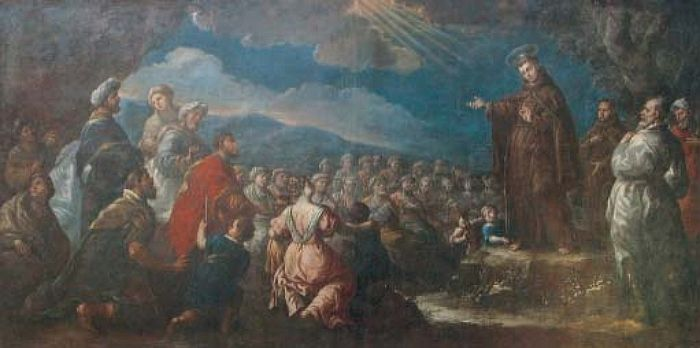
The preaching of Saint Anthony of Padua, a painting of 2.5 by 5m now at the Museo de San Antolín in Tordesillas.

Alonso del Arco (1635–1704) was a Spanish painter.

== Life ==
Born at Madrid in 1635, he was a disciple of Antonio de Pereda. He was deaf from birth and was called "El Sordillo de Pereda". He was an eminent painter, both of history and portraits. Several of his pictures are mentioned by Palomino, particularly the Miraculous Conception, and the Assumption of the Virgin, in the cloister of the Trinitarios Descalzos at Madrid, and in the church of San Salvador is a fine picture of Santa Teresa. Ceán Bermudez enumerates a great number of his works in the churches at Madrid, and in other public buildings throughout Spain. He died at Madrid in 1704.
