= Igreja de Castro de Avelãs =

Church in Bragança District, Portugal

Coordinates: 41.7989943°N 6.8045117°W

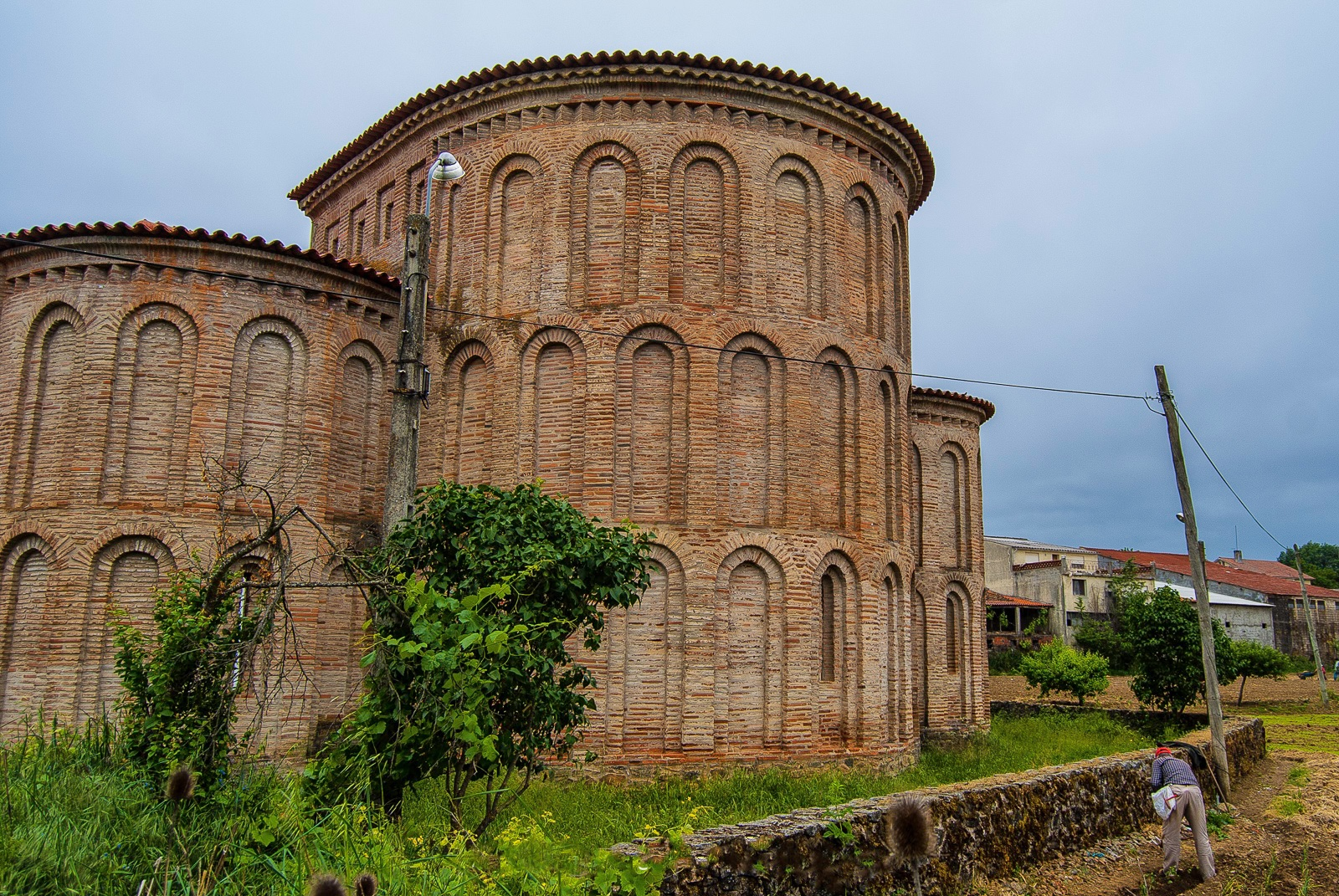
The apse of the church in Mudéjar style

The Igreja de Castro de Avelãs is a National monument of Portugal. It is located in Bragança Municipality, in the parish of Castro de Avelãs.
