= Mudéjar art =

Art style in post-Islamic Spain

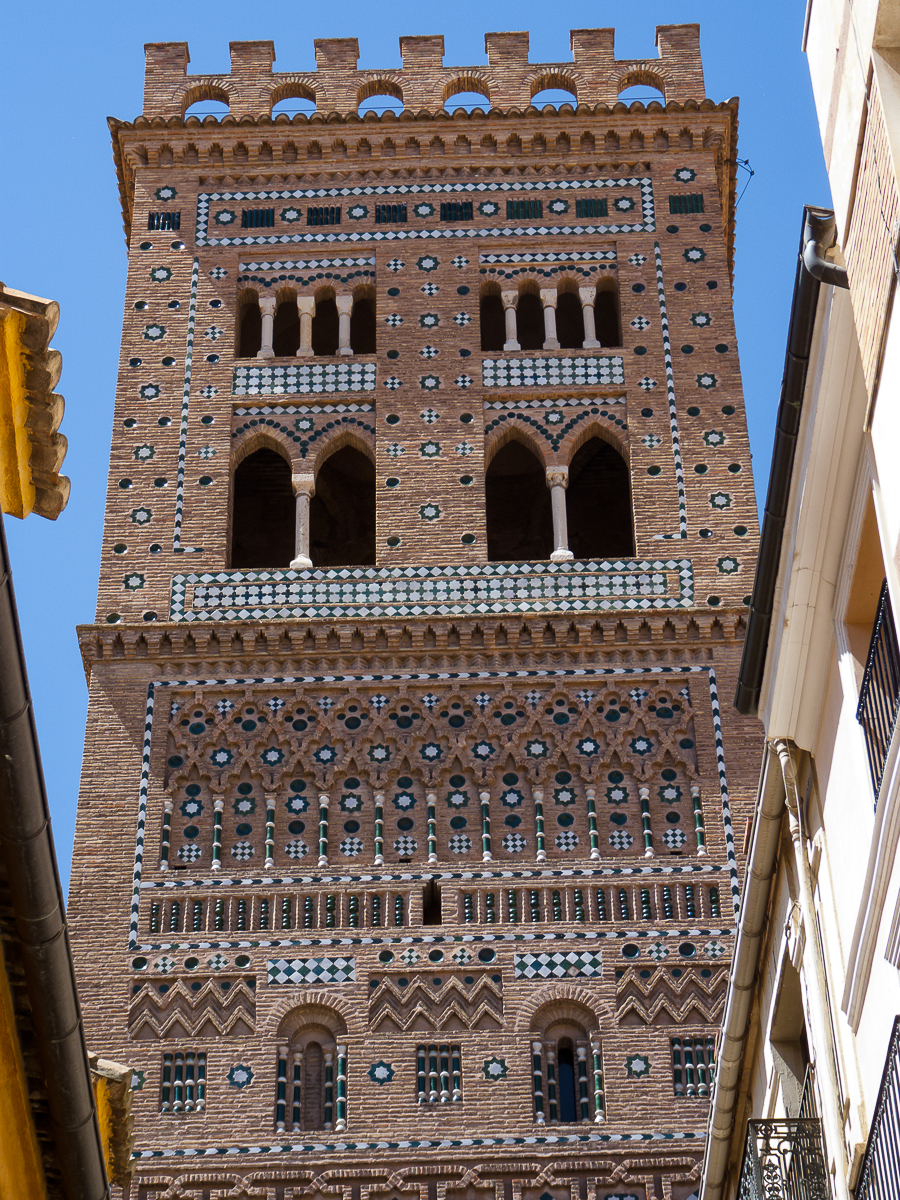
The bell tower of the church of San Salvador, Teruel, Aragon

Mudéjar art, or Mudéjar style, was the confluence of Islamic ornamentation and Christian architecture in the Iberian Peninsula used in the Iberian Christian kingdoms, primarily between the 13th and 16th centuries. It was applied to Romanesque, Gothic and Renaissance architectural styles as constructive, ornamental and decorative motifs derived from those that had been brought to or developed in Al-Andalus. These motifs and techniques were also present in the art and crafts, especially Hispano-Moresque lustreware that was once widely exported across Europe from southern and eastern Spain at the time.

The term Mudejar art was coined by the art historian José Amador de los Ríos y Serrano in reference to the Mudéjars, who played a leading role in introducing Islamic derived decorative elements into the Iberian Christian kingdoms. The Mudéjars were the Muslims who remained in the former areas of Al-Andalus after the Christian Reconquista in the Middle Ages and were allowed to practice their religion to a limited degree. Mudéjar art is valuable in that it represents peaceful co-existence between Muslims and Christians during the medieval era, although all Muslims and Jews in Spain eventually were forced to convert to Christianity or exiled between the late 15th century and the early-to-mid 16th century.

The Mudéjar decorative elements were developed in Iberia specially in the context of historic architecture. There was a revival in the late-19th and the early-20th-century Spain and Portugal as Neo-Mudéjar style.

== Etymology ==
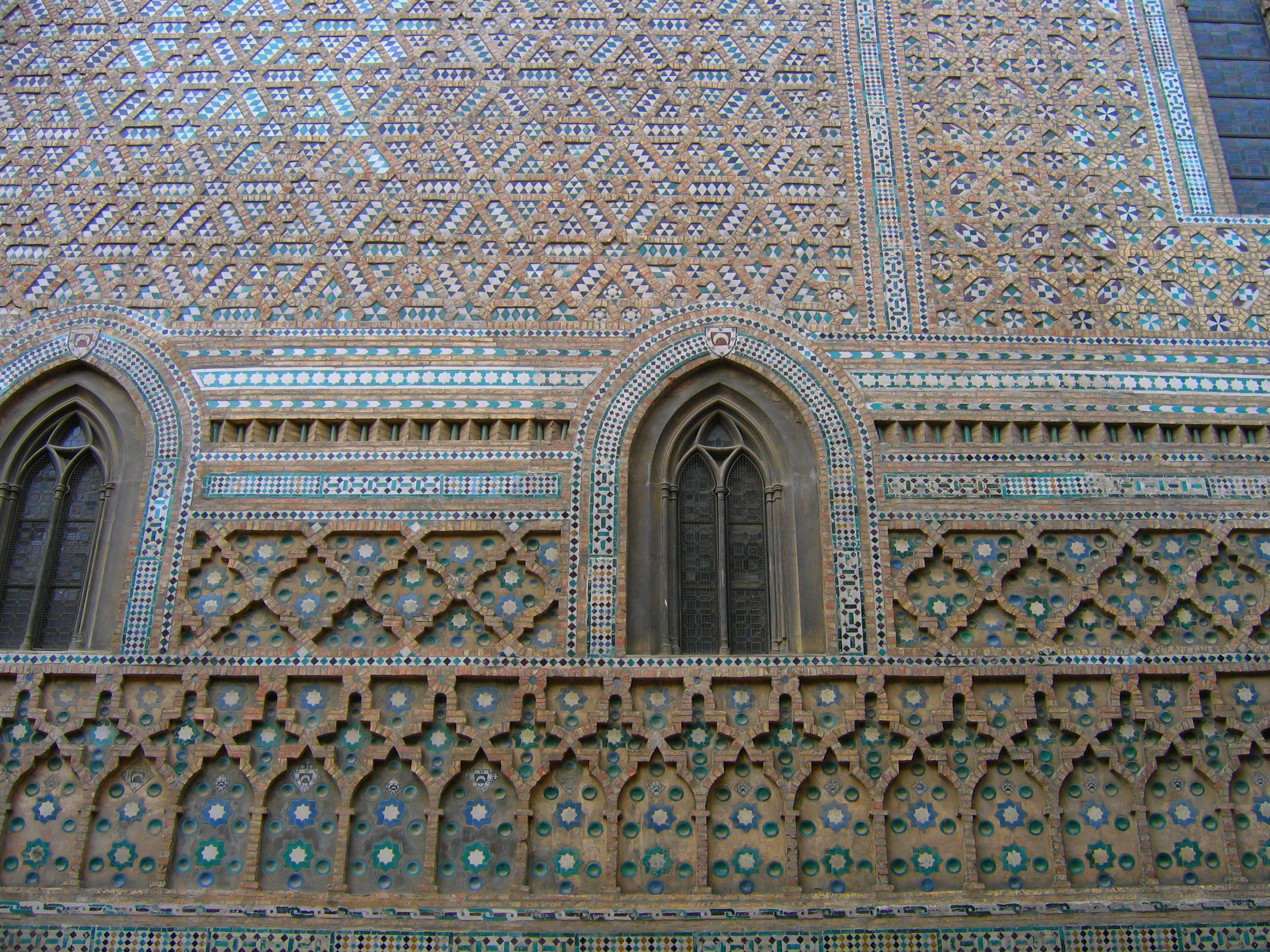
Façade of Parroquieta Chapel of La Seo de Zaragoza, Aragon, a gothic building with elaborate mudéjar masonry

Mudéjar was originally the term used for Muslims of Al-Andalus who remained after the Christian reconquest of Muslim controlled territories in the later Middle Ages but were not initially converted to Christianity or exiled. It was a medieval Castilian borrowing of the Arabic word Mudajjan مدجن, meaning "tamed", referring to Muslims who submitted to the rule of Christian kings. The term likely originated as a taunt, as the word was usually applied to domesticated animals such as poultry. The term Mudéjar can also be translated from Arabic as "one permitted to remain", which references Christians allowing Muslims to remain in Christian Iberia. The concept "arte mudéjar" was coined and defined by the Spanish art historian José Amador de los Ríos y Serrano in his induction discourse El estilo mudéjar, en arquitectura at the Academia de Bellas Artes de San Fernando in 1859.

== Muslims in medieval Christian kingdoms ==
The Muslims living in the medieval Christian kingdoms of the Iberian Peninsula, called Mudejars, were tolerated and could practice their religion with certain restrictions. However, soon after the last Muslim stronghold in the peninsula, the Granada, fell to the Christian Castile in 1492, Muslims were forced to choose between becoming Christians or to leave, first in Castile and soon after in Aragon. Those who chose to convert and stay were called Moriscos, and were often suspected of secretly practicing Islam, and were finally expelled from Spain after 1609.

What allowed Mudejar culture to survive and flourish in the medieval Christian kingdoms depended upon whether the capture by Christians was accomplished through negotiated surrender or military defeat, the ratio of Muslim to Christian populations, the competing interests of the monarchy and the papacy, and economic exigencies. With a balance of these things, Mudejar art was born. As a result of this local variation, the Islamic influences that were absorbed into the Christian architectural practices of the different regions in the Christian kingdoms differed greatly, but all come under the general umbrella term of Mudejar art.

== Mudéjar style in architecture ==
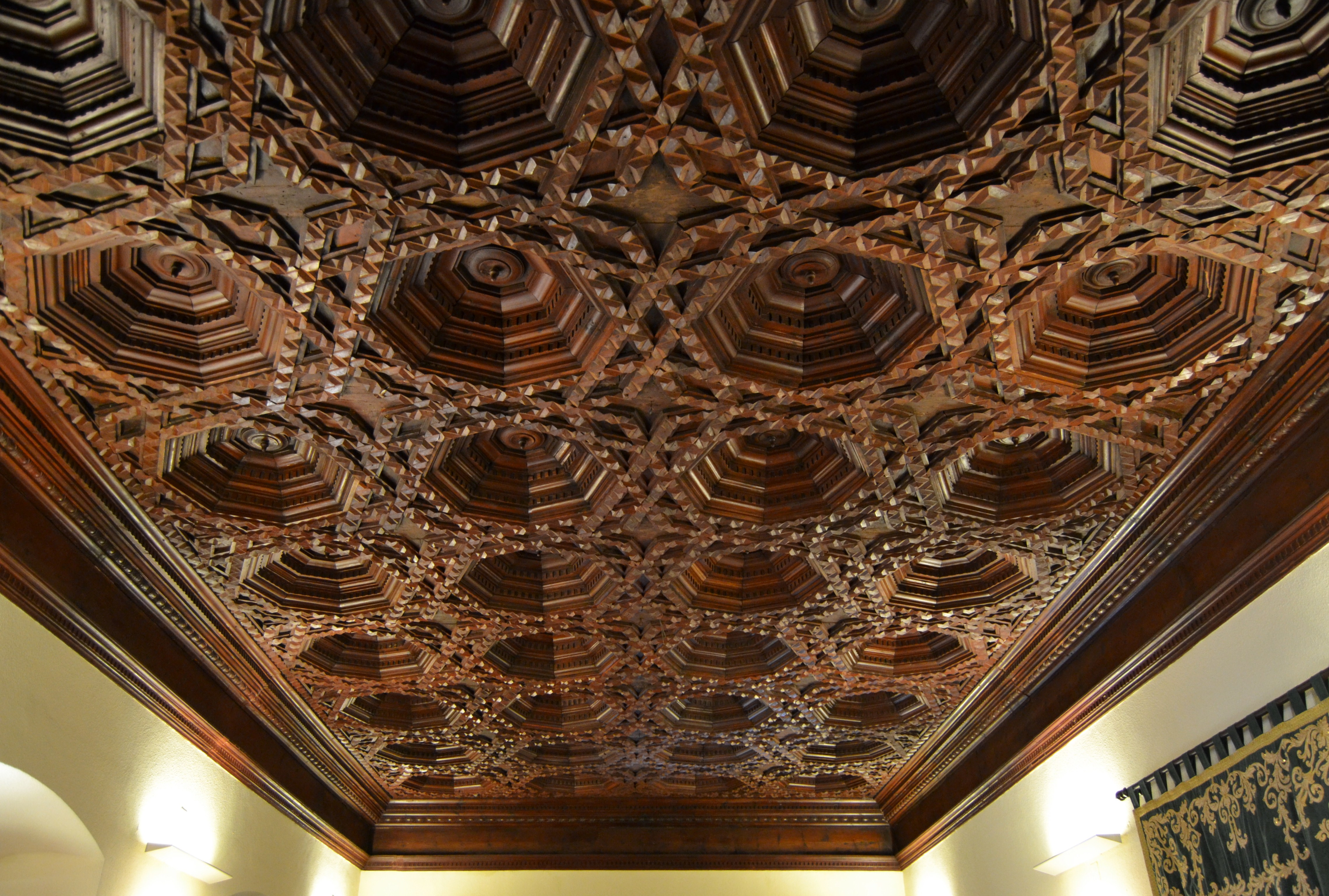
Mudéjar style ceiling carpentry, Segorbe town hall (former ducal palace), Valencia Region

Mudejar style in architecture refers to the application of decorative Islamic art styled motifs and patterning to Christian styles of architecture. It is thought to have begun with Muslim craftsmen who applied traditional constructive, ornamental, and decorative elements derived from the Islamic arts to Christian styles of architecture. These methods became part of local Christian building traditions and were applied to Romanesque, Gothic, and Renaissance architectural styles in the expanding Christian kingdoms of Iberia. These decorative techniques included calligraphy, intricate geometry, and vegetal forms derived from Islamic art and architecture.

Mudejar constructive systems were very simple and extremely effective. The materials used included brick, along with other artificial stone materials, and wood, which were not only entrusted with a constructive function but which were also decorative. Brick held great importance as a material of construction, its maneuverability and resistance, aesthetic characteristics and inexpensive nature, made it suitable for architecture that needed to be built in a timely fashion.

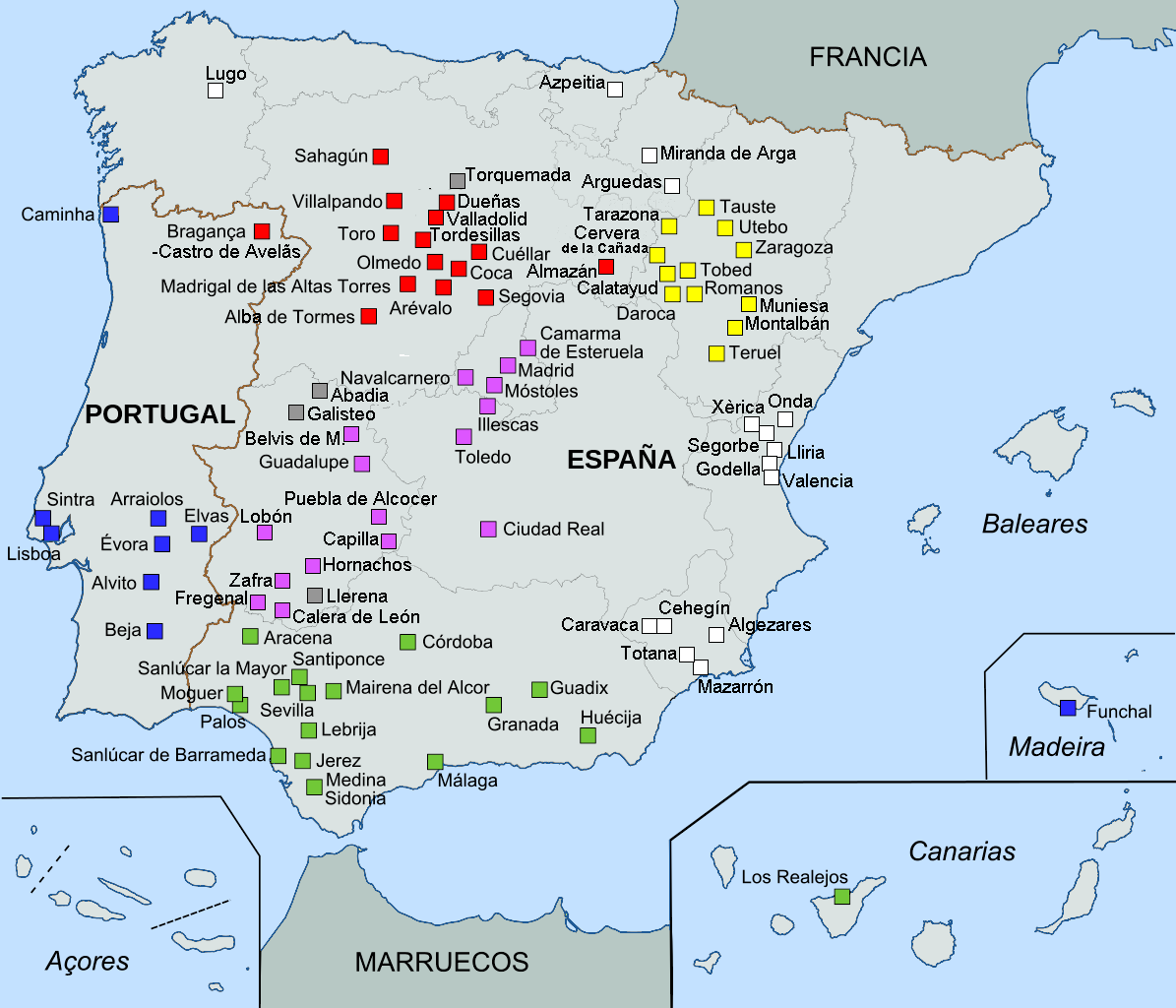
The main sites of Mudéjar decorated buildings in Spain and Portugal: Early examples (grey) and regional subtypes: Aragon (yellow); Castile & León (red); Toledo (purple); Portugal (blue); Andalusia (olive green); other (white)

Mudejar decoration and ornamentation includes stylized calligraphy and intricate geometric and vegetal forms. The classic Mudéjar elements include the horseshoe and multi-lobed arch, muqarna vaults, alfiz (molding around an arch), wooden roofing, fired bricks, glazed ceramic tiles, and ornamental stucco work. Mudejar plasterwork, sometimes called Yeseria, includes all the Islamic motifs, such as epigraphic, “atauriques,” or arabesque ornament, and geometrical motifs, although motifs of Christian art are also included, such as Gothic vegetables and shields, they are depicted in the rhythm of Islamic tradition, which plays an important role in chromatics. Mudéjar often makes use of girih geometric strapwork decoration, as used in Middle East architecture, where Maghreb buildings tended to use vegetal arabesques. Scholars have sometimes considered the geometric forms, both girih and the complex vaultings of muqarnas, as innovative, and arabesques as retardataire, but in Al-Andalus, both geometric and vegetal forms were freely used and combined.

=== Iberian Peninsula ===
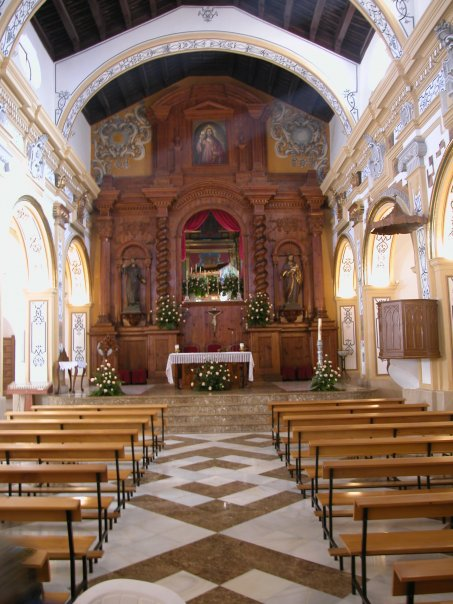
Nuestra Señora de Loreto, Algezares, city of Murcia: wooden ceiling on "diaphragm" arches

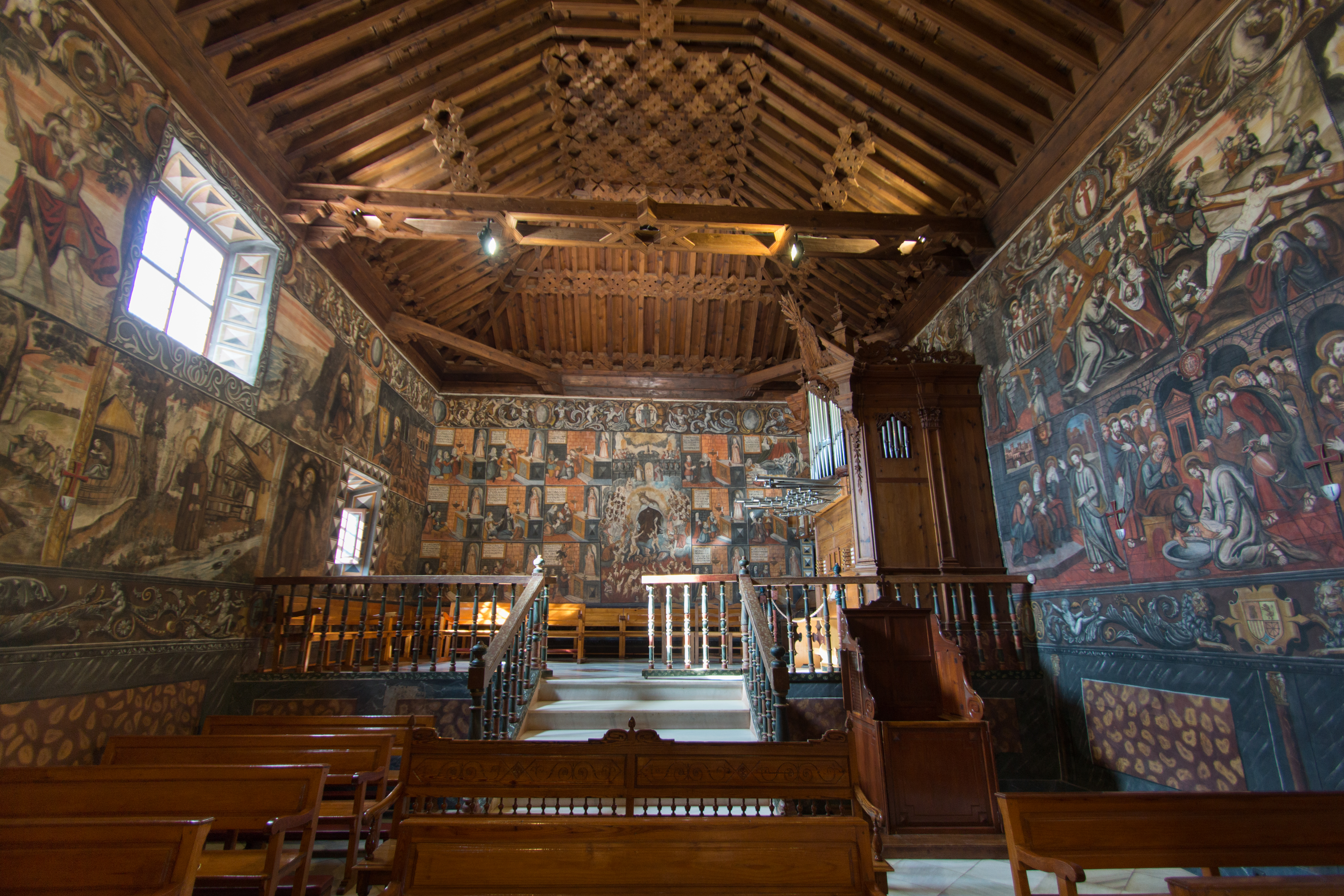
Santa Eulalia Church in Totana, Murcia Region

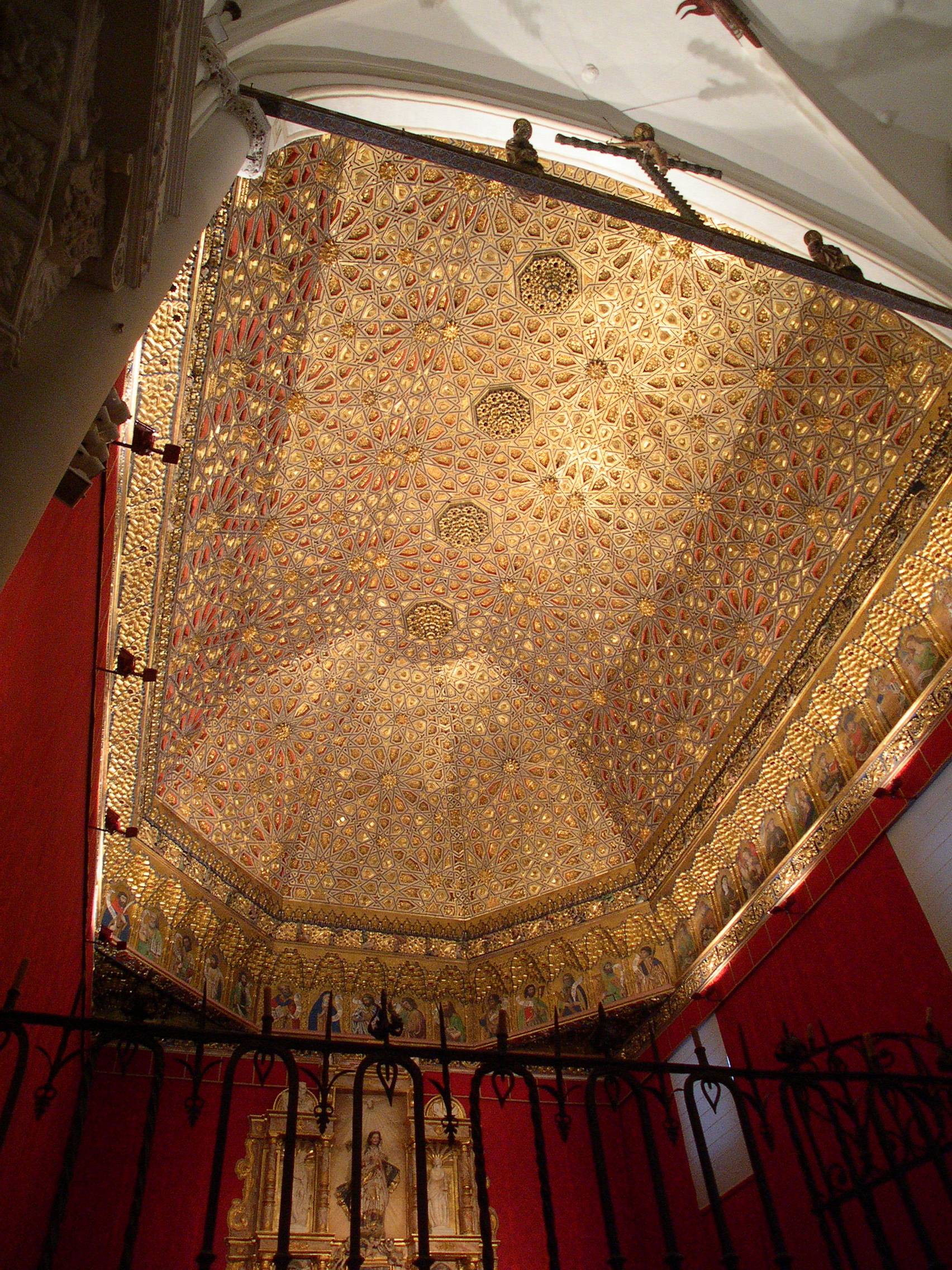
Geometric design: Royal Convent of Santa Clara in Tordesillas with girih-patterned artesonado ceiling

With the re-establishment of Christian rule throughout the formerly Muslim controlled areas of Iberia came the different Mudéjar construction methods for creating a building using inexpensive materials like brick, wood, and stucco. It is generally accepted by scholars that Mudéjar art in architecture first appeared in the northern town of Sahagún in the 12th century Christian Kingdom of León. Mudéjar spread to other parts of the Kingdom of León: notable examples can be found in Toledo, Ávila, Segovia, Toro, Cuéllar, Arévalo and Madrigal de las Altas Torres. Later, Mudéjar was spread into southern Spain by the Kingdom of Castile. A particularly fine example of Mudéjar Renaissance is the Casa de Pilatos, built in the early 16th century at Seville. Seville includes many other examples of Mudéjar art. The Alcázar of Seville is considered one of the greatest surviving examples of Mudéjar Gothic and Mudéjar Renaissance architecture although its so-called Mudéjar Rooms are directly related to the Moorish Nasirid architecture of the Alhambra rather than to Mudéjar art techniques; the Christian king Pedro of Castile employed architects from the then Islamic Emirate of Granada to construct them.

Mudéjar art emerged in the north-eastern Christian Kingdom of Aragon in the 12th century and includes more than a hundred surviving examples, located predominantly in the valleys of the Ebro, Jalón and Jiloca. Its first manifestations have two origins: on the one hand, a palatial architecture linked to the Christian monarchy, which amended and extended the originally Moorish Aljafería Palace and maintained an Islamic ornamental tradition, and on the other hand, a tradition that developed Romanesque architecture using brickwork rather than stone construction and which often displays Hispanic ornamental tracery. Examples of the latter type of Mudéjar elements can be seen in churches in Daroca, which were started in stone and finished off in the 13th century with Mudéjar brick panels.

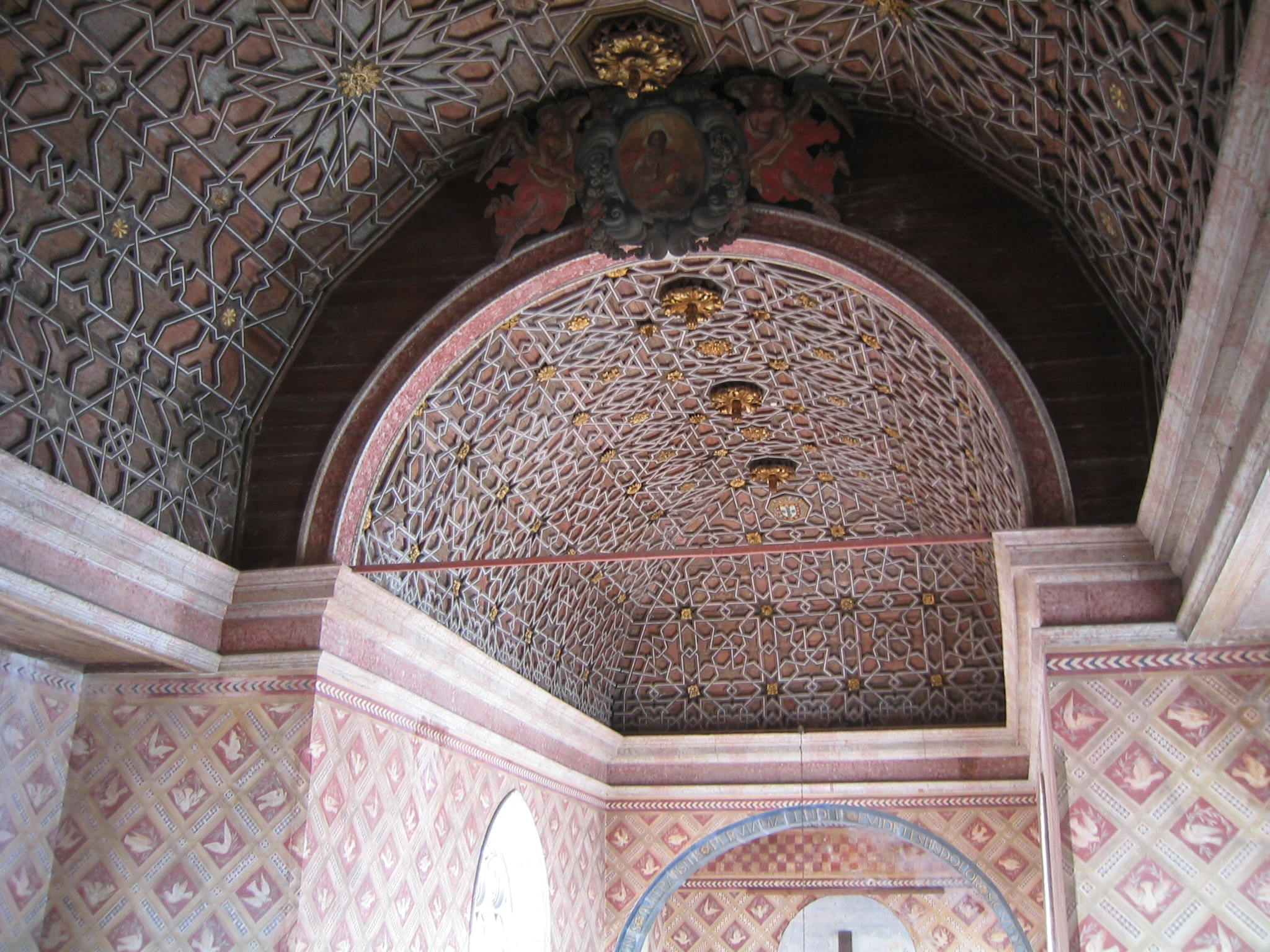
Wooden mudéjar roof of the chapel of the Royal Palace of Sintra (Portugal) with 4-, 6-, 8- and 12-point stars in girih strapwork

Portugal commissioned fewer Mudéjar decorated buildings, which generally incorporated simpler Mudéjar elements. The Church of Castro de Avelãs in Braganza features classic Mudéjar art brick work. Mudéjar also tended to be applied to the gothic Manueline style in Portugal, which was very lavish and ornate. Portuguese use of Mudéjar art developed particularly in the 15th and 16th centuries, and structures such as the Palace of the Counts of Basto and the Royal Palace feature characteristic wooden Mudéjar roofs that are also to be found in some churches in towns such as Sintra and Lisbon. Since trade was an essential part of Portugal's culture in the 16th century, imported Mudéjar art decorated tiles from Seville appear in churches and palaces, such as the Royal Palace of Sintra.

=== Hispanic America ===
La Pila fountain, in Chiapa de Corzo, Mexico. Built in 1562, it is an example of Mudéjar-Renaissance; of brick and in the shape of a diamond.

Christian builders and craftsmen carried Mudéjar style elements to the overseas territories of the Spanish empire, especially in the 16th century, complementing Renaissance architecture before the emergence of Baroque. The Mudéjar "style" in architecture is most accurately described as a “common visual language” rather than a cohesive structure with particular regulations. This led to Mudejar design themes in the New World to be considered purely a continuation of an architectural blend that was unique to Spain.

The Church of San Miguel in Sucre, Bolivia, provides an example of Mudéjar in Hispanic America with its interior decorations and the open floor plan. Mudéjar geometric design can be seen through its octagonal patterned wood ceiling and in the underside of the supporting arches, which are carved with a vegetable motif based on the arabesque. San Miguel is a direct inheritor of the Mudéjar and tradition of the expansion and multiplication of an initial pattern. Around the octagonal dome, there are more wooden ceiling panels carved with the same pattern as the church's ceiling. Additionally, the white stucco walls demonstrate the Baroque influence on the church exemplifying the transculturation found in Spanish architecture.

Some other notable examples of Mudejar design in Hispanic America are:

- The Monastery of San Francisco in Lima, Peru also contains Mudéjar elements. The vaults of the central and two side naves are painted in Mudéjar style. The halls of the head cloister are inlaid with Sevillian glazed tiles, and the main altar is made entirely from carved wood.
- The Iglesia del Espíritu Santo in Havana, Cuba.
- Other examples of Mudéjar art can be found in Coro, a UNESCO World Heritage Site in Venezuela.

=== Gallery ===
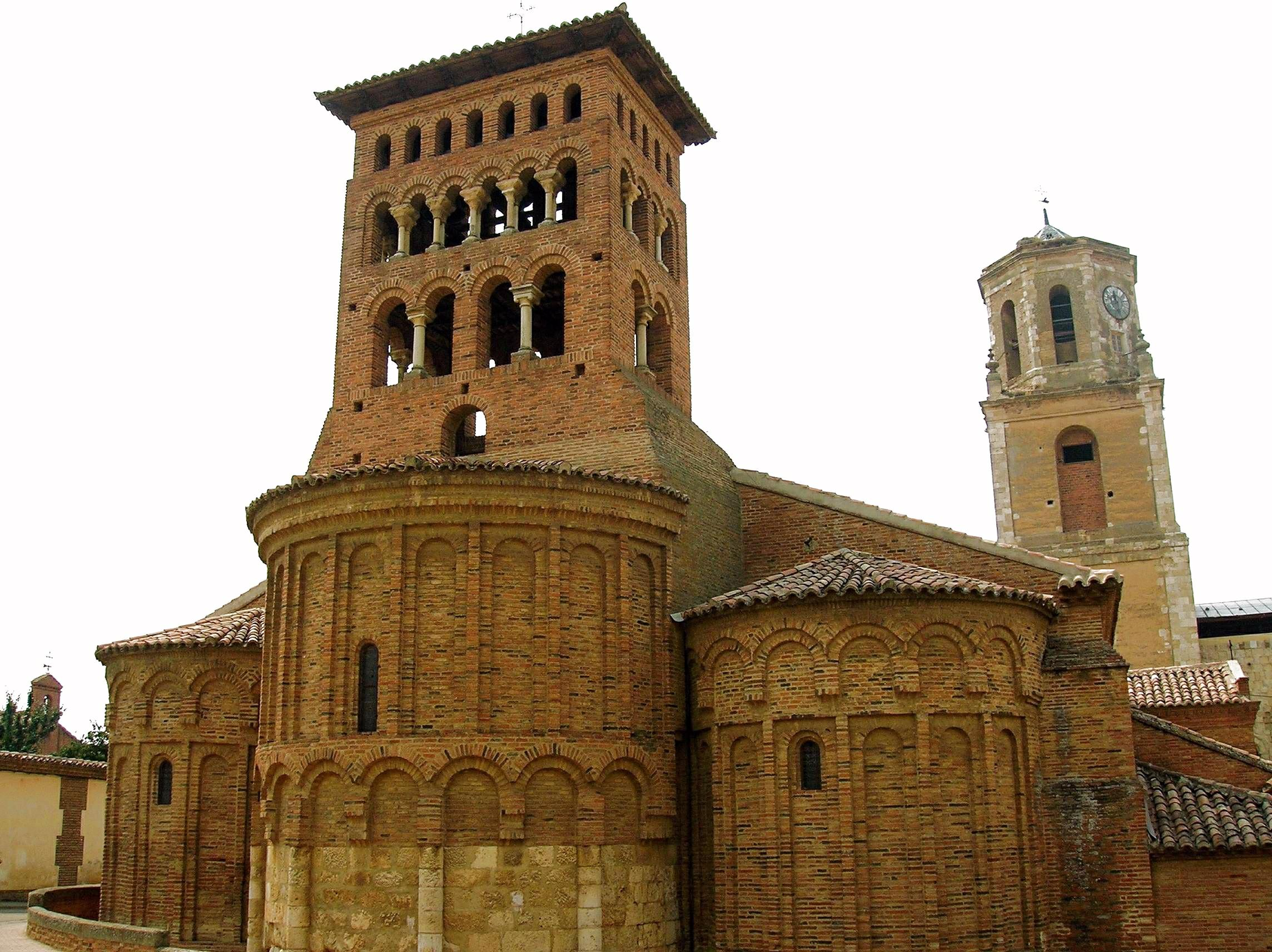
San Tirso in Sahagún, mudéjar or brick romanesque, (León), Spain

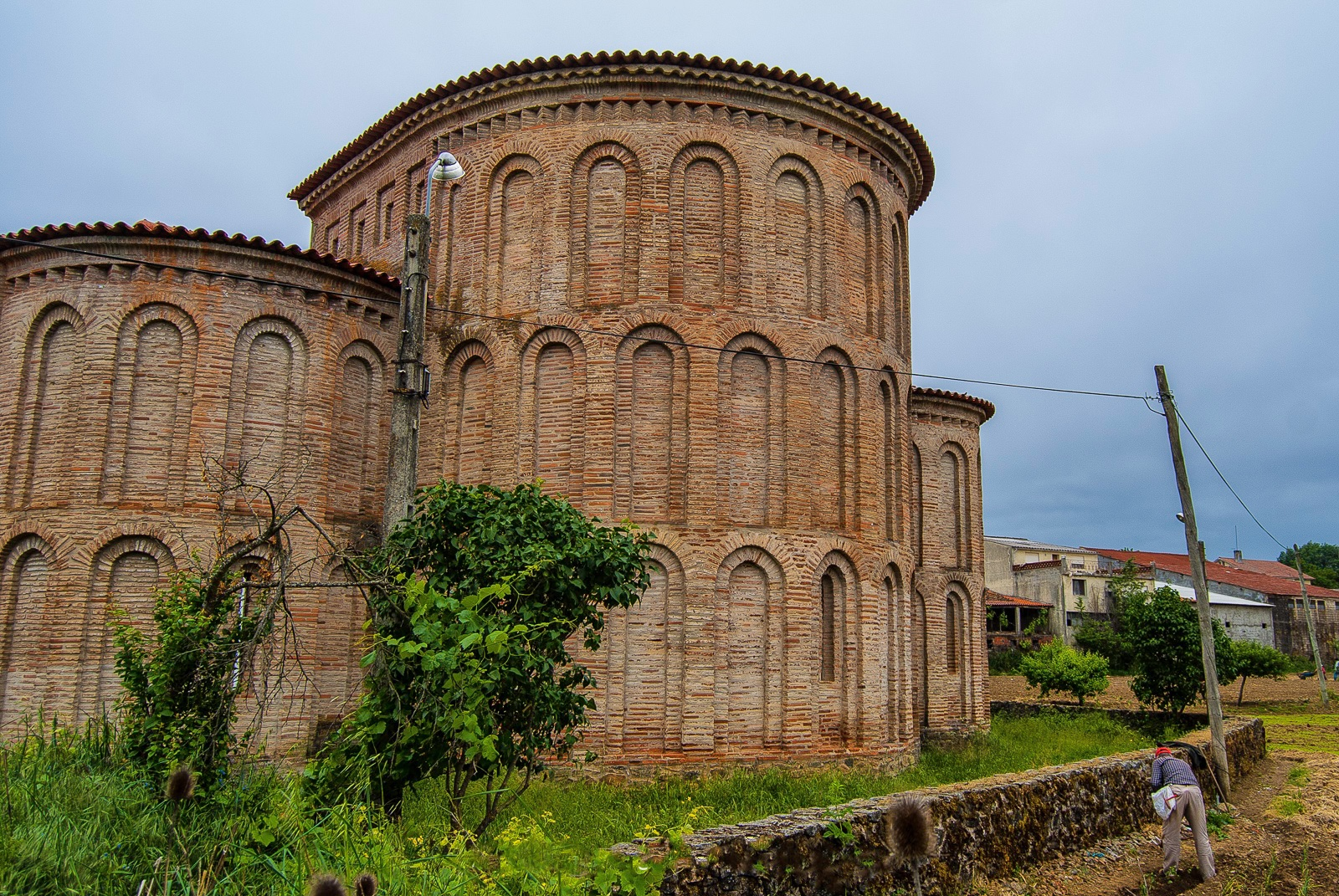
Church of Castro de Avelãs, mudéjar romanesque, 13th and 14th centuries, Bragança, Portugal

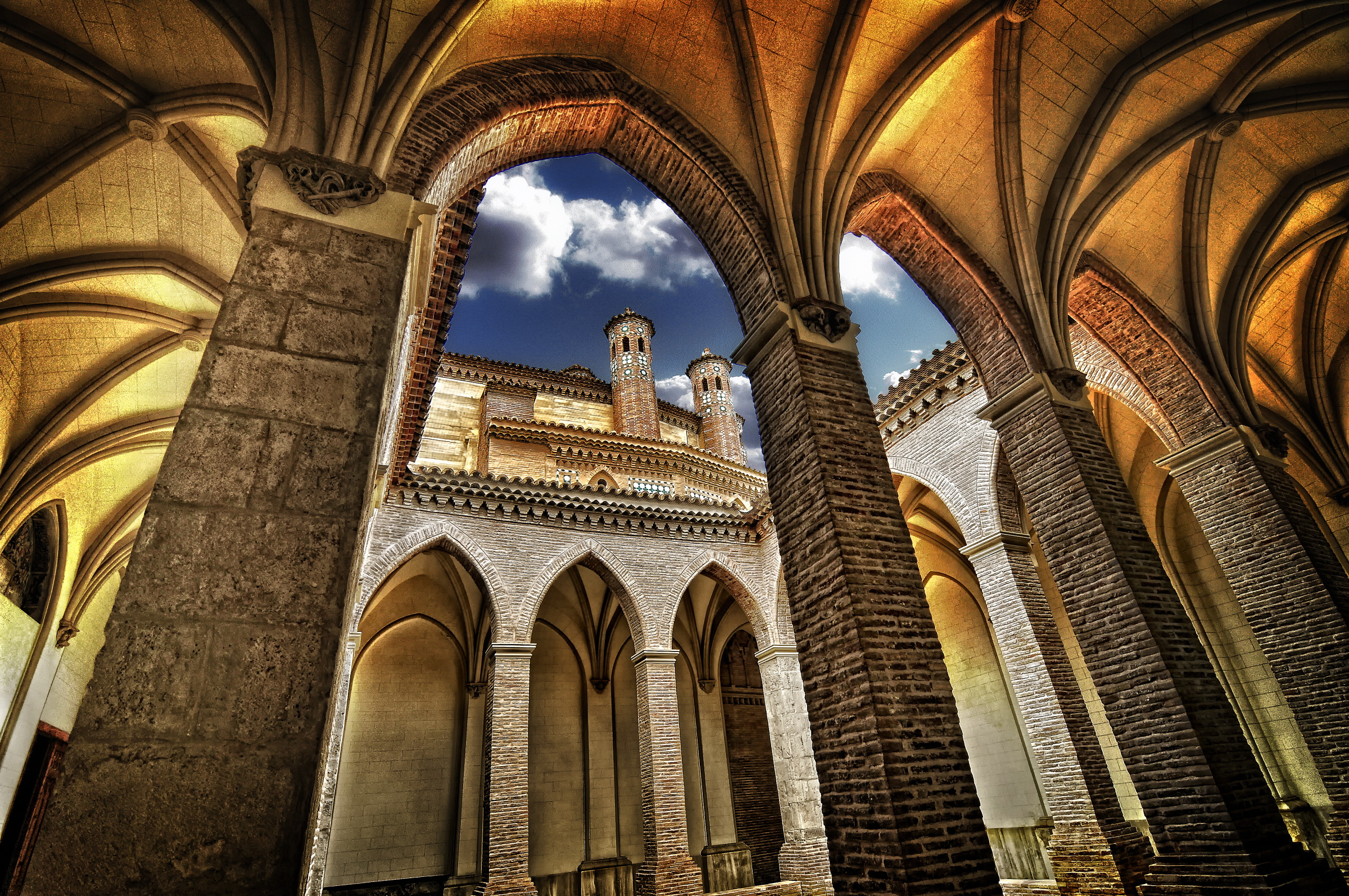
A mudéjar gothic cloister, La Iglesia de San Pedro, Teruel, Spain

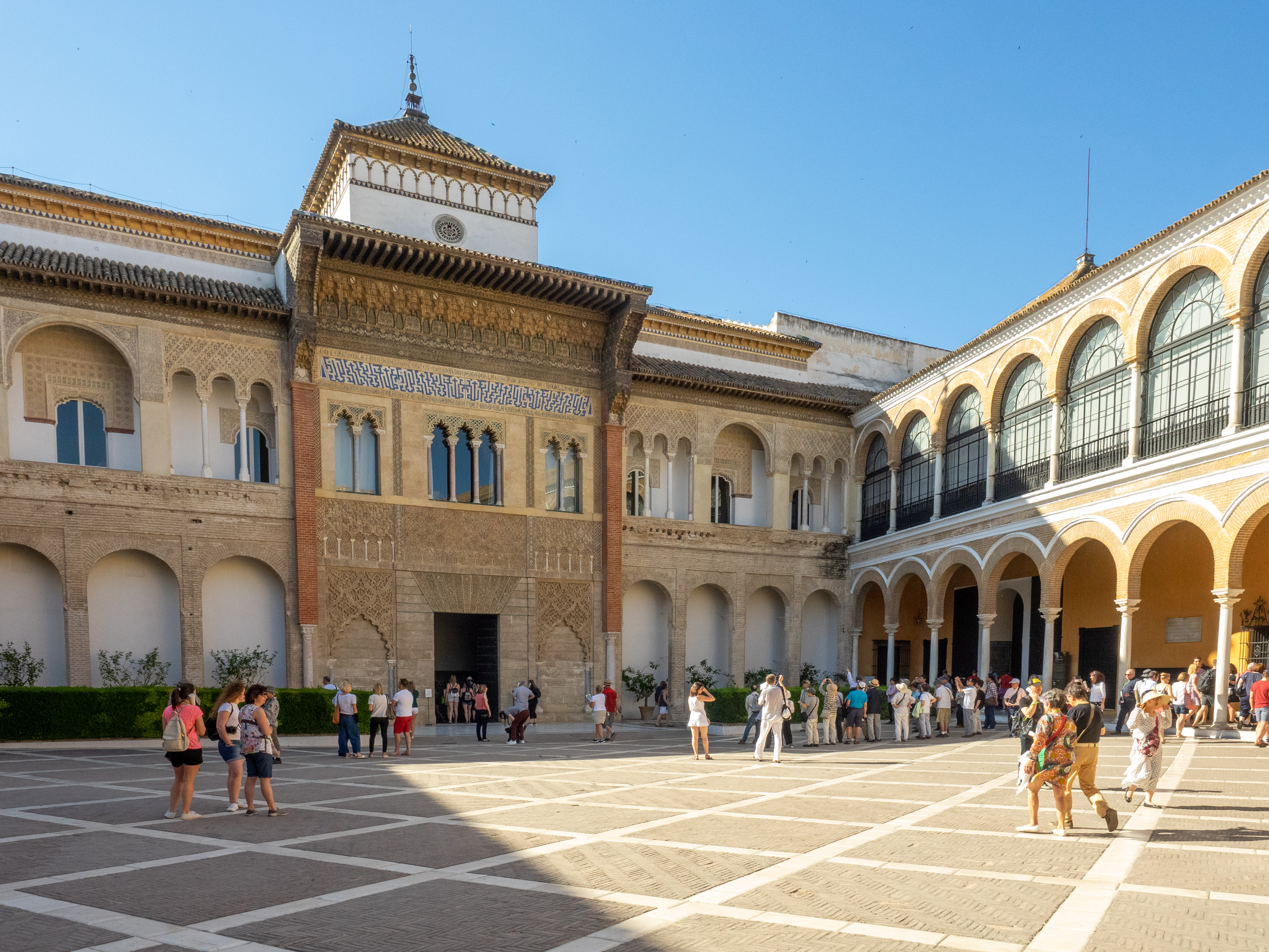
The Royal Alcázars of Seville, Spain, built in the 14th to the 18th centuries, with mudejar applied to gothic, renaissance and baroque structures

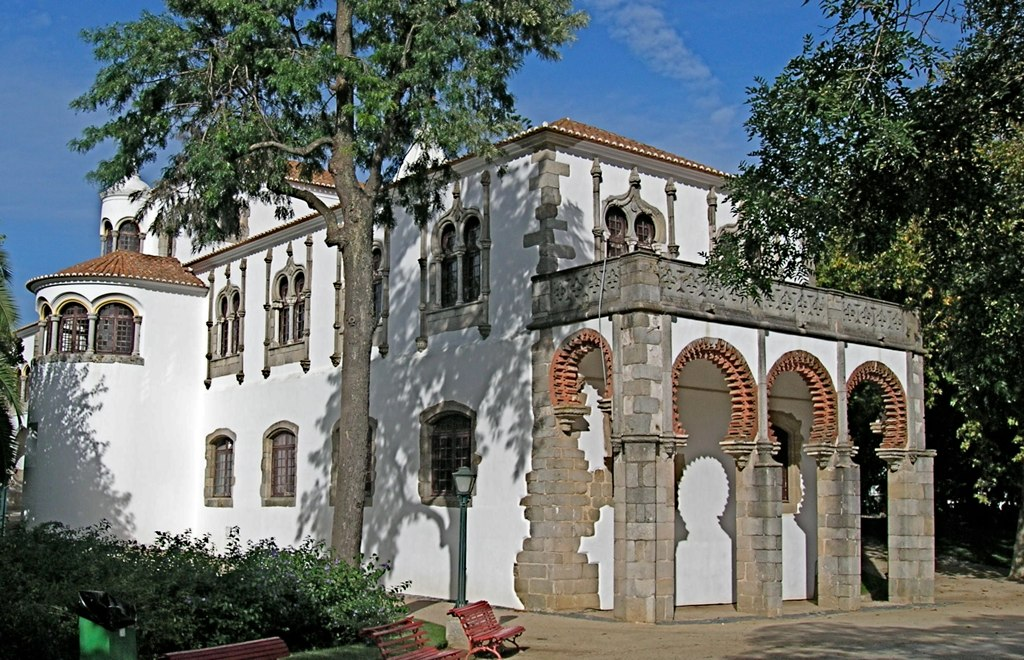
Gallery of Dames, Royal Palace of Évora, 16th century, mudéjar manueline, Portugal

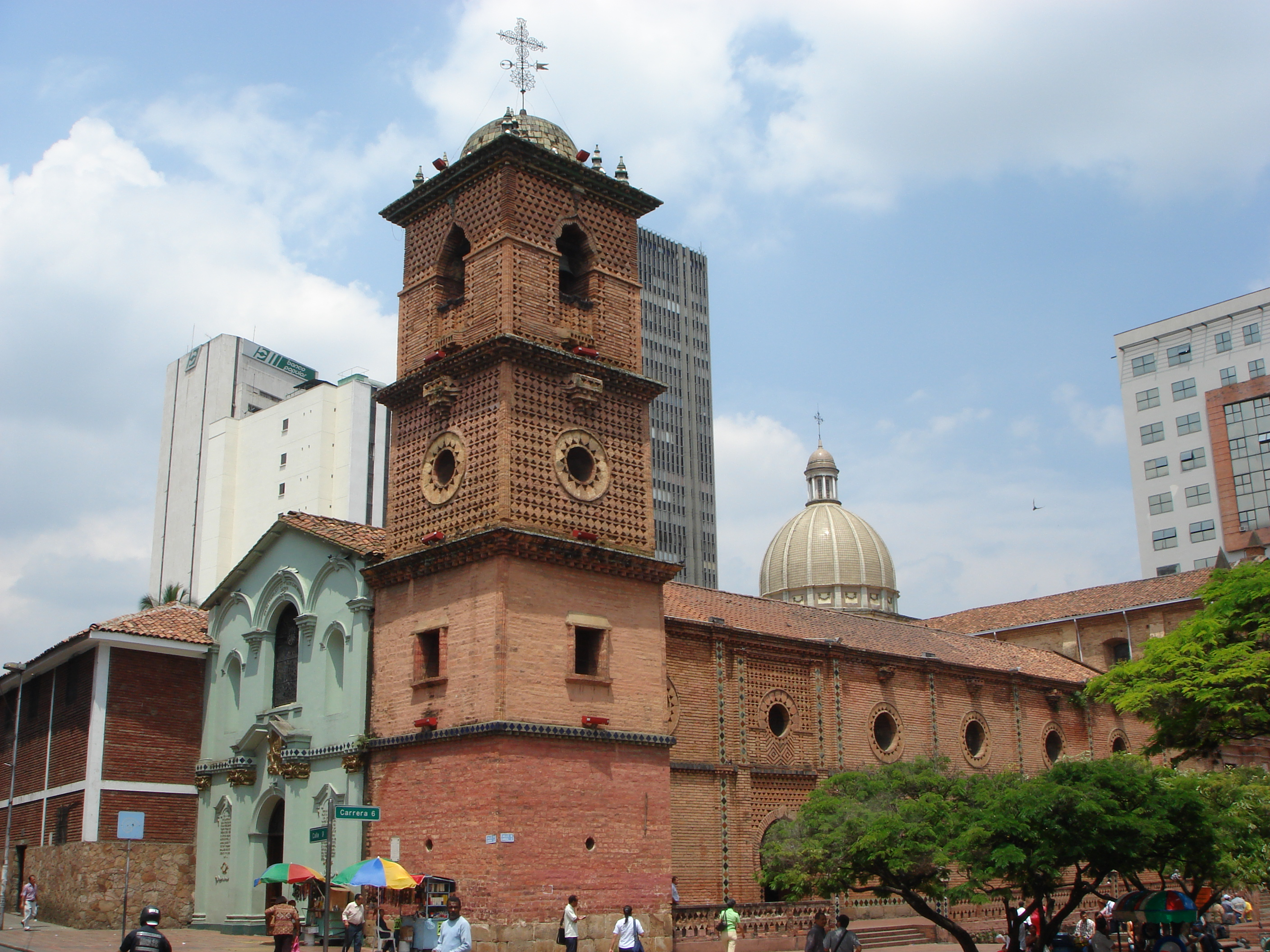
Mudéjar art in the walls and bell tower of the Chapel of the Immaculate Conception in Cali, Colombia

== Mudéjar style in other arts ==
=== Decorative arts ===
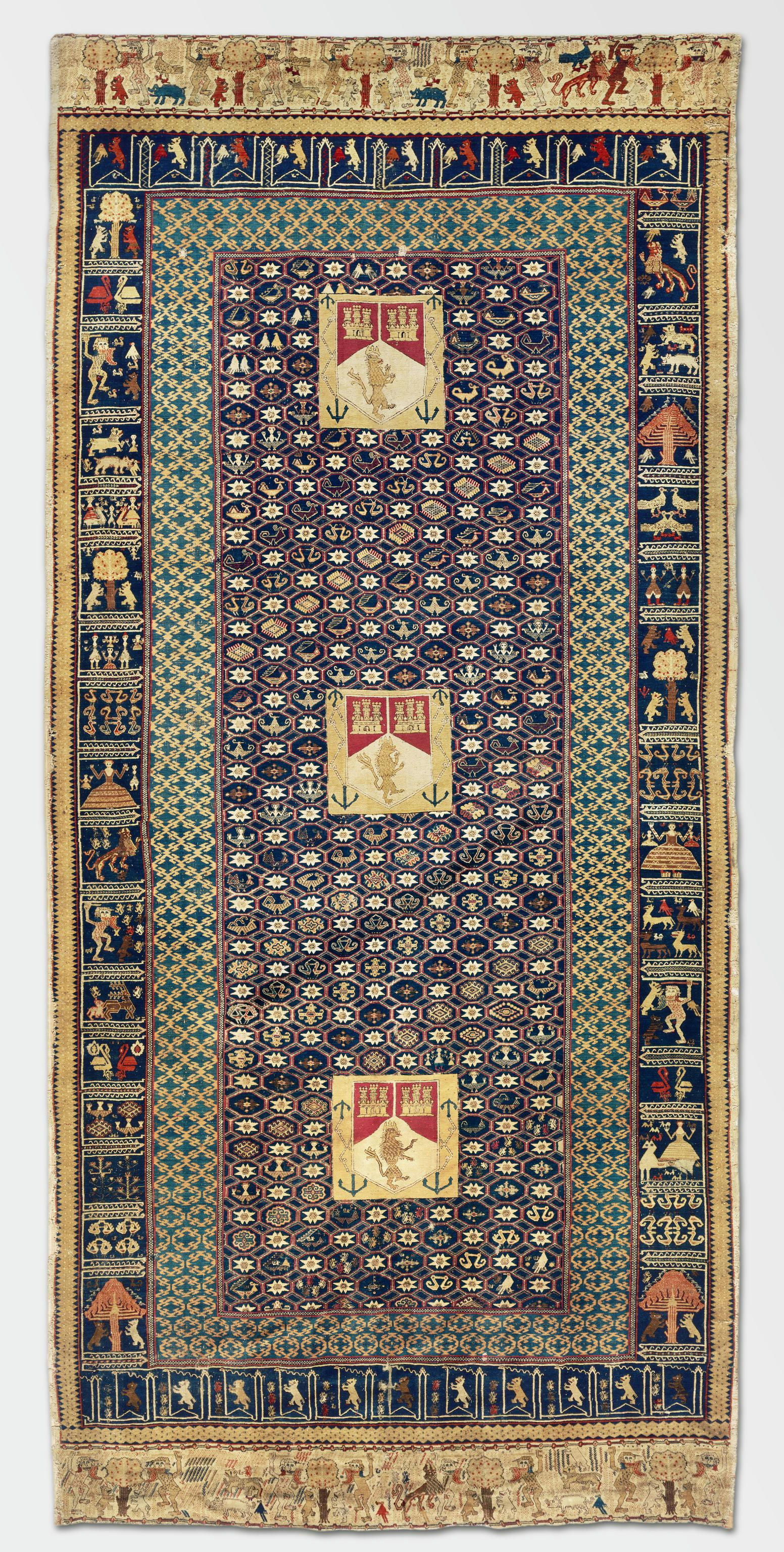
Carpet probably made for Fadrique Enríquez, whose coat of arms — an upright lion beneath two triple-towered castles bordered by anchors and ropes — is repeated three times in the center field. Philadelphia Museum of Art

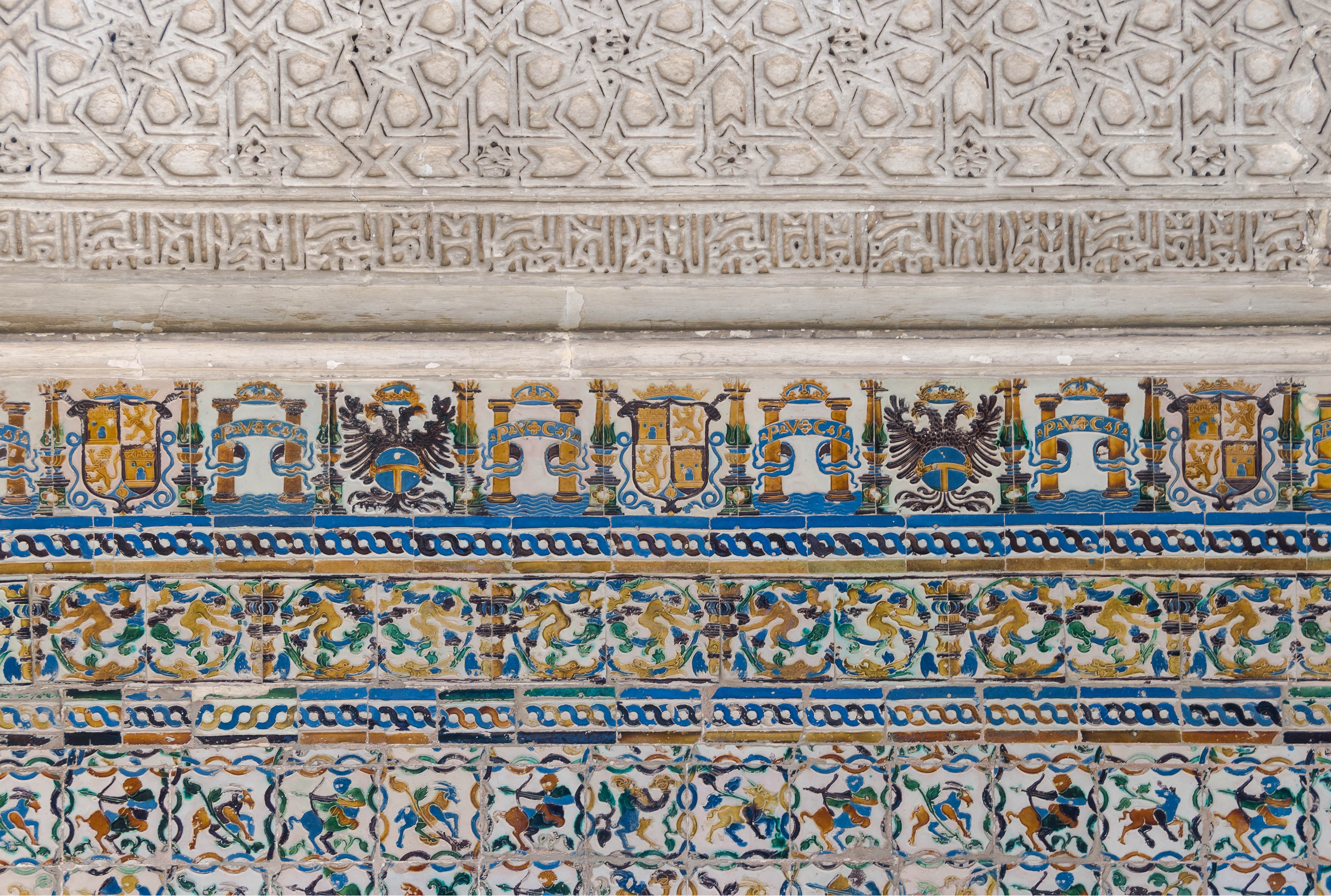
Detail of Mudéjar tile work from the palace garden of Charles V in Seville.

Mudejar artisans brought into the Christian kingdoms the elaborate geometric designs found in tilework, brickwork, wood carving, plasterwork, ceramics, and ornamental metals of Al-Andalus. Objects, as well as ceilings and walls, were often decorated with rich and complicated designs, as Mudéjar artists were not only interested in relaying wonder, a key feature of Islamic art and architectural traditions, but in conveying the sumptuousness of materials and ornament. Many decorative arts were applied to architecture, such as the tiling and ceramic work, as well as carving practices.

To enliven the surfaces of wall and floor, Mudéjar art developed complicated tiling patterns. The motifs on tile work are often abstract, leaning more on vegetal designs and straying from figural images (which is common in Islamic work). The colors of tile work of the Mudéjar period are much brighter and more vibrant than other European styles. The production process was also typical of techniques that had been used in Islamic Iberia, the tile was fired before it was cut into smaller, more manageable pieces. This approach meant that the tiles and glaze work shrank less in the firing process, and retained their designs more clearly. This allowed the tiles to be laid closer together with less grout, making the compositions more intricate and cohesive.

=== Ceramics ===
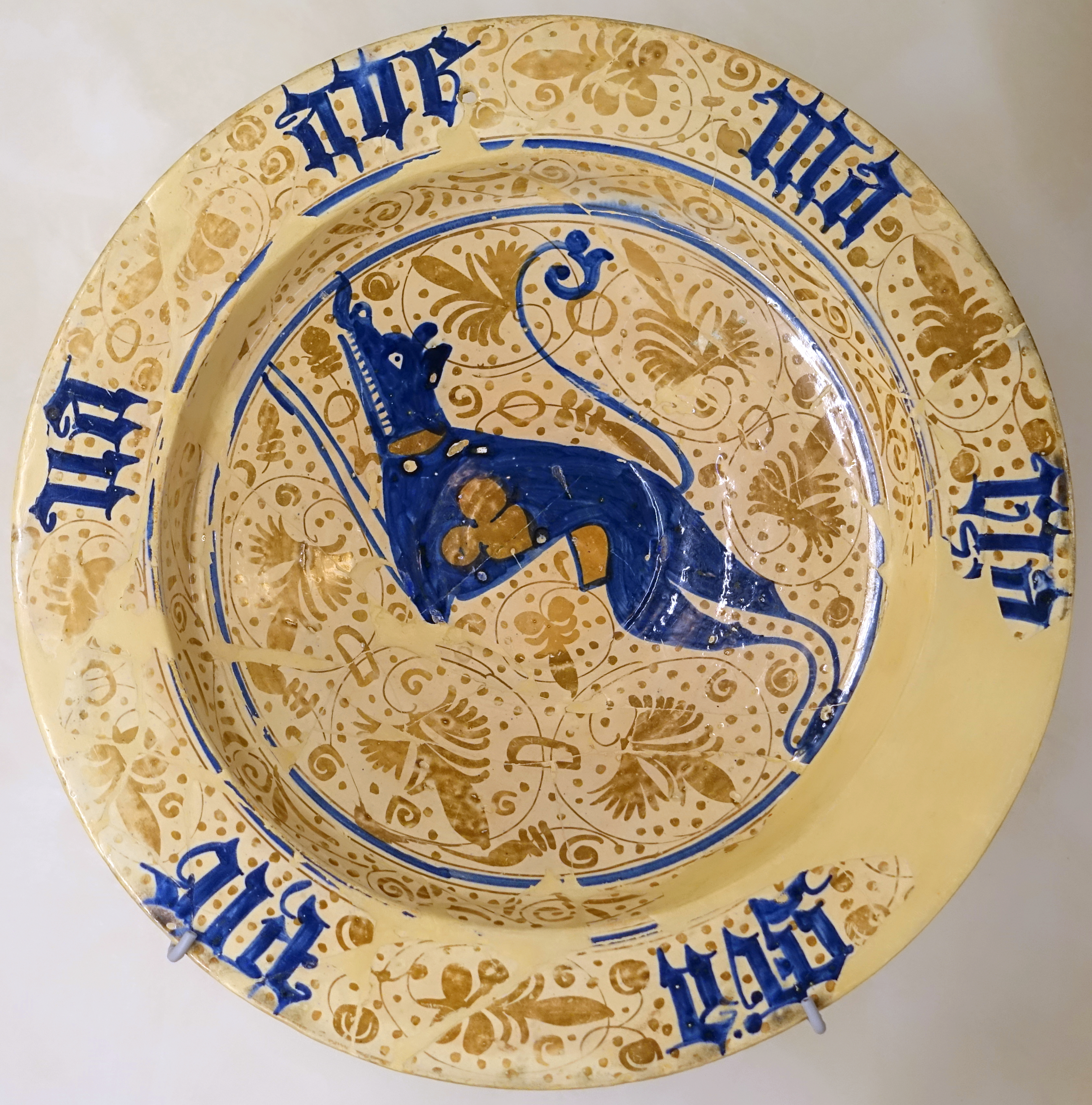
Christian Hispano-Moresque ware: Mudéjar art luster ware with figurative animal motifs and pseudo calligraphy.

Ceramics had been a sophisticated art form during the period of Islamic rule in the Iberian Peninsula and Mudéjar style ceramics were built on the techniques developed in the previous centuries of Islamic art. Pottery centers all over Spain - e.g. Paterna, Toledo, Seville - focused on making a range of objects, from bowls and plates to candlesticks. Mudejar style ceramics were typically worked in three “styles:” green-purple ware (manganese green), (cobalt) blue ware, and gold-glazed ware (lusterware). Mudejar artisans introduced their perfected glazing techniques to Medieval Europe where Mudejar pottery from Manises, Paterna, and Teruel were the most popular. A transparent glaze could be achieved through the mixing of lead and tin for an opaque, shiny white glaze, and mixtures of metal oxides were applied to the glazed and fired surfaces to create lustre decoration. This technique was carried on from the Nasrid period. Typically, artisans would apply a layer of opaque white glaze before the colors. On top of the white, cobalt blue, green copper, and purple manganese oxides were used to make vibrant, shimmering surfaces with the appearance of gold and other precious metals. Similarly to tile and stucco work, ceramic motifs included vegetal patterns, in addition to figurative motifs, calligraphy, and geometric patterns and images. There are also Christian influences in the imagery, such as boats, fern leaves, hearts, and castles.

== Neo-Mudéjar ==
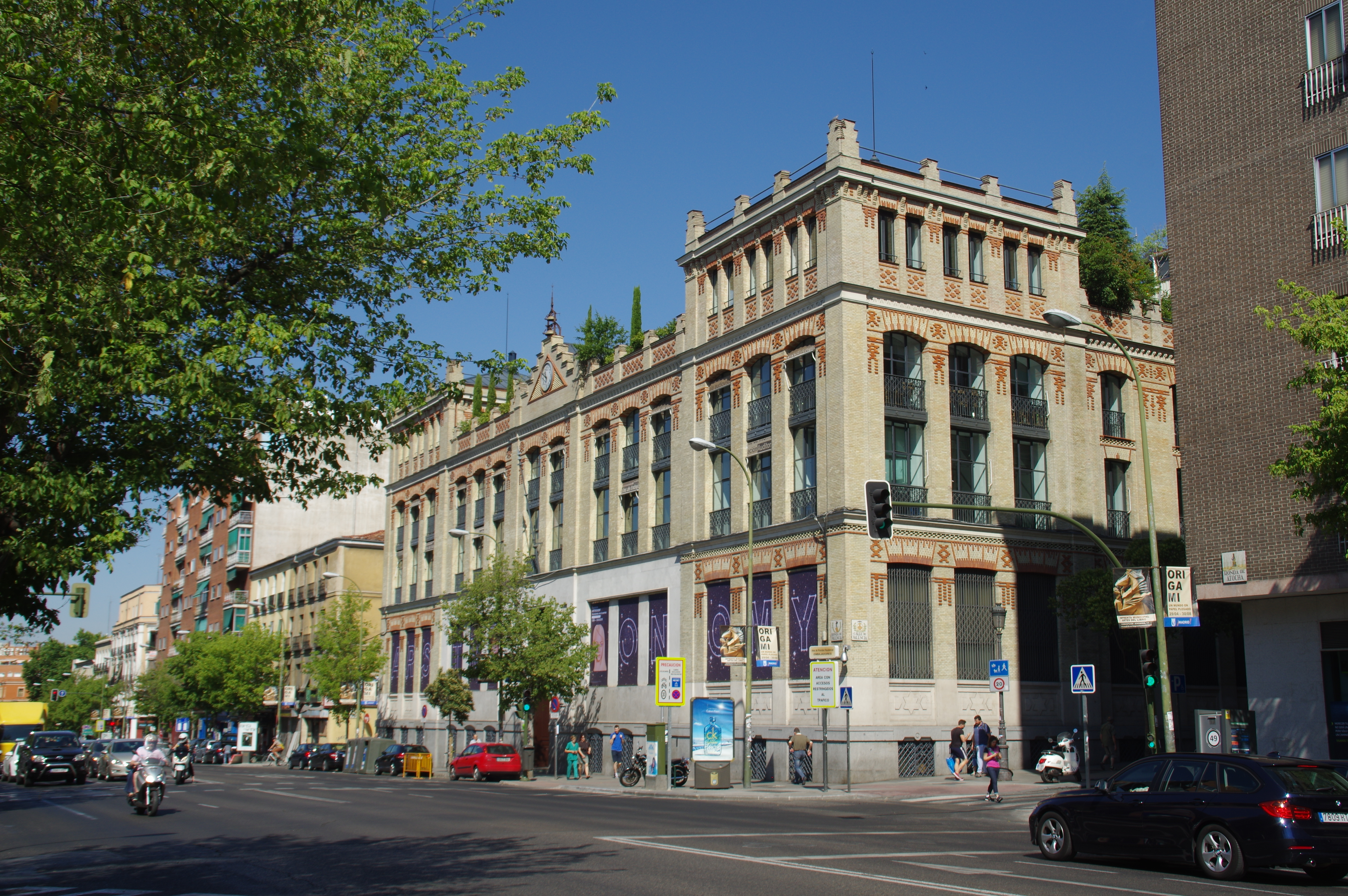
Neo-Mudéjar style in an office building in Madrid.

Mudéjar art has had modern revivals, the most important being Neo-Mudéjar, which appeared in Spain and Portugal in the late 19th and early 20th centuries. It combined modern architecture and materials, including cast iron and glass with Mudéjar art styled arches, tiling, and brickwork.

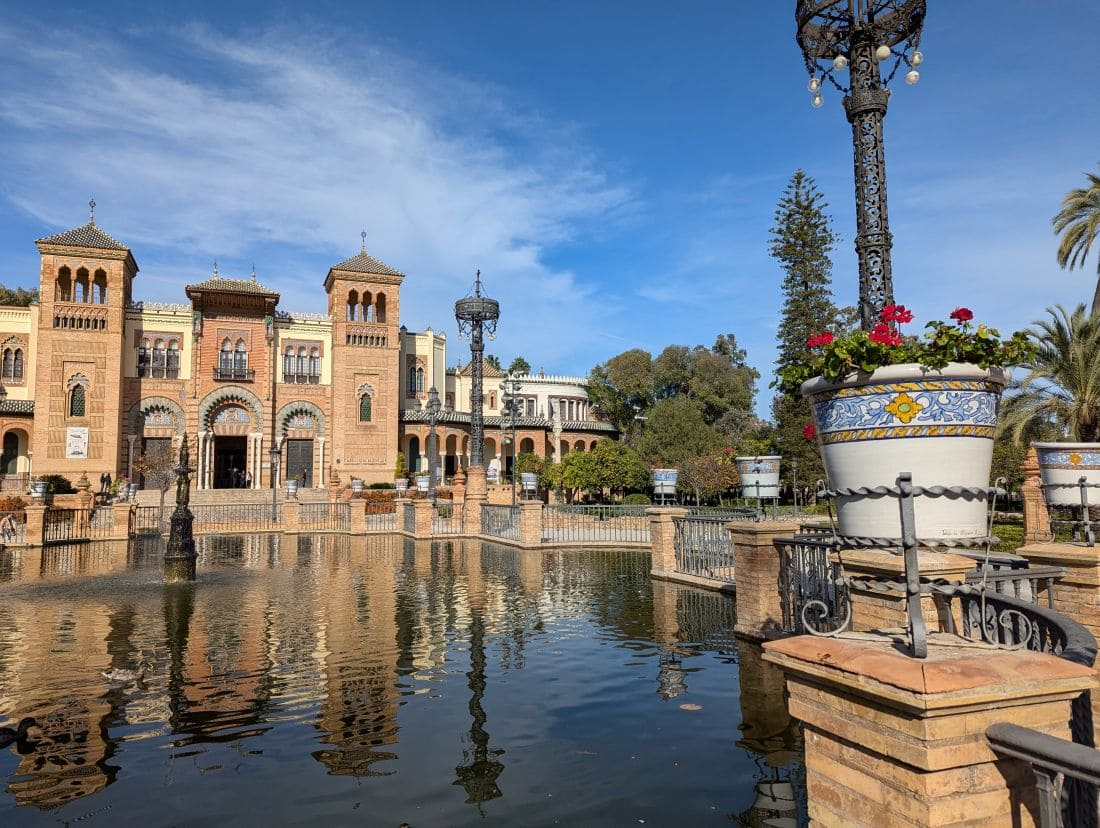
Neo-Mudéjar Pavilion in Seville

Neo-Mudéjar was especially prominent in Seville during the 1929 Ibero-American Exposition, when buildings such as the Plaza de España, the Mudéjar Pavilion, and the Hotel Alfonso XIII were constructed. These buildings especially showcased the work of Aníbal González, the chief architect of the Exposition, whose signature style combined traditional Mudéjar motifs with contemporary influences.

Some Spanish architectural firms have turned their attention to building projects in the modern Arabic-speaking world, specifically Morocco, Algeria, and Eastern Arabia, where Mudéjar art influences are commissioned as a preferred style of housing. Mudéjar characteristics continue to act as a foundation for modernizing styles. Muslim architects are also currently making great strides in terms of modern architecture, reflecting the technical and engineering feats, as well as aesthetic expertise, reminiscent of the Mudéjar styles.

== See also ==
- Artesonado
- Mudéjar Architecture of Aragon
- Moorish Revival architecture
- Walls of Cuéllar
- Azulejo

== Bibliography ==
- ARTEHISTORIA, director. El Arte Mudéjar. YouTube, YouTube, 17 June 2008, www.YouTube.com/watch?v=xLuE7w1Zszo.
- Boswell, John (1978). Royal Treasure: Muslim Communities Under the Crown of Aragon in the Fourteenth Century. Yale University Press. ISBN 0-300-02090-2
- Borrás Gualis, G. (2006). Mudéjar: An Alternative Architectural System in the Castilian Urban Repopulation Model. Medieval Encounters, 12(3), 329–340. https://doi.org/10.1163/157006706779166075
- Britannica, The Editors of Encyclopaedia. "Manueline | architectural style". Encyclopedia Britannica. Retrieved 2019-05-09.
- Britannica, The Editors of Encyclopaedia. “Mudejar.” Encyclopædia Britannica, Encyclopædia Britannica, Inc., 20 July 1998, www.britannica.com/topic/Mudejar.
- Centre, U. (n.d.). Mudejar Architecture of Aragon. Retrieved November 30, 2020, from https://whc.unesco.org/en/list/378/
- Chalmeta, P., “Mudéjar”, in: Encyclopaedia of Islam, Second Edition, Edited by: P. Bearman, Th. Bianquis, C.E. Bosworth, E. van Donzel, W.P. Heinrichs. Consulted online on 30 October 2020 <https://referenceworks-brillonline-com.
- Cummins, F. (2017). Mudéjar Americano. In A Companion to Islamic Art and Architecture (pp. 1023–1050). John Wiley & Sons, Inc. https://doi.org/10.1002/9781119069218.ch39
- Encyclopedia. "Art in Spain and Portugal | Encyclopedia.com". www.encyclopedia.com. Retrieved 2019-05-09.
- Garma, David de la. “Mudéjar Ceramics.” Arte Celta (ARTEGUIAS), 2012, www.arteguias.com/ceramica-mudejar.htm.
- Gonzalo M Borrás Gualís, Pedro Lavado Paradinas, Rafael Lopez Guzman, Maria Pilar Mogollón Cano-Cortes, Alfredo Morales Martínez, Maria Teresa Pérez Higuer "EL ARTE MUDÉJAR. La estetica islámica en el arte cristiano"
- Gonzalez, Elena. “Spanish Architecture in the Arab World.” Andalusi and Mudejar Art in Its International Scope: Legacy and Modernity, 9 Sept. 2015, pp. 197–211.
- Harvey, L. P. (1 November 1992). Islamic Spain, 1250 to 1500. University of Chicago Press. ISBN 978-0-226-31962-9.
- Harvey, L. P. (16 May 2005). Muslims in Spain, 1500 to 1614. University of Chicago Press. ISBN 978-0-226-31963-6.
- King, Georgiana Goddard. Mudejar. Longmans Ed, 1927.
- Linehan, P. (Ed.), Nelson, J. (Ed.), Costambeys, M. (Ed.). (2018). The Medieval World. London:Routledge, https://doi.org/10.4324/9781315102511
- Jones, L. G. (2009). Mudejar. In J. E. Campo, J. G. Melton (Ed.), Facts on File Library of Religion and Mythology: Encyclopedia of World Religions. Encyclopedia of Islam (pp. 486–487). Facts on File. https://link.gale.com/apps/doc/CX1692200398/GVRL?u=txshracd2598&sid=GVRL&xid=8772a220
- Makrickas, Augustas. “Islamic Influence on Western Architecture.” Academia.edu, 2013.
- Menocal, Maria Rosa (2002). "Ornament of the World: How Muslims, Jews, and Christians Created a Culture of Tolerance in Medieval Spain". Little, Brown, & Co. ISBN 0-316-16871-8
- Museum With No Frontiers. (2004). Discover Islamic Art Virtual Exhibitions: Mudéjar Art. Retrieved November 16, 2020, from http://islamicart.museumwnf.org/exhibitions/ISL/mudejar_art/?lng=en
- Rubenstein, Richard (2003). "Aristotle's Children: How Christians, Muslims, and Jews Rediscovered Ancient Wisdom and Illuminated the Middle Ages." Harcourt Books. ISBN 0-15-603009-8
- Saba, Matthew. "Abbasid Lusterware and the Aesthetics of 'ajab." Muqarnas: An Annual on the Visual Cultures of the Islamic World 29 (2012): 187–212
- Sanz, A. (2018). Historical and Structural Aspects of the Mudéjar Architecture of the Spanish City of Guadalajara. In 10th International Symposium on the Conservation of Monuments in the Mediterranean Basin (pp. 415–423). Springer International Publishing. https://doi.org/10.1007/978-3-319-78093-1_44
- “Scattering Seeds from the Garden of Allah.” Teposcolula Retablo, 2000, interamericaninstitute.org/work_in_progress.htm.
- Sheren, I. (2011). Transcultural Architecture: Mudéjar's Epic Journey Reinterpreted. Contemporaneity (Pittsburgh, PA), 1, 137–151. https://doi.org/10.5195/CONTEMP.2011.5
- Time Out. “Architecture.” TimeOut Madrid, Time Out Guides, 2010, pp. 32–34.
- Voigt. “Tile Style.” Moorish Tile History, 1 Jan. 1970, letstalktile.blogspot.com/2011/01/moorish-tile-history.html.
- Wacks, David A. Cultural Exchange in the Literatures and Languages of Medieval Iberia. 30 Oct. 2013, davidwacks.uoregon.edu/tag/aljamiado/.
