= Convent of the Calced Augustinians, Toledo =

Augustinian located in Toledo, Spain

Coordinates: 39.8592°N 4.0250°W

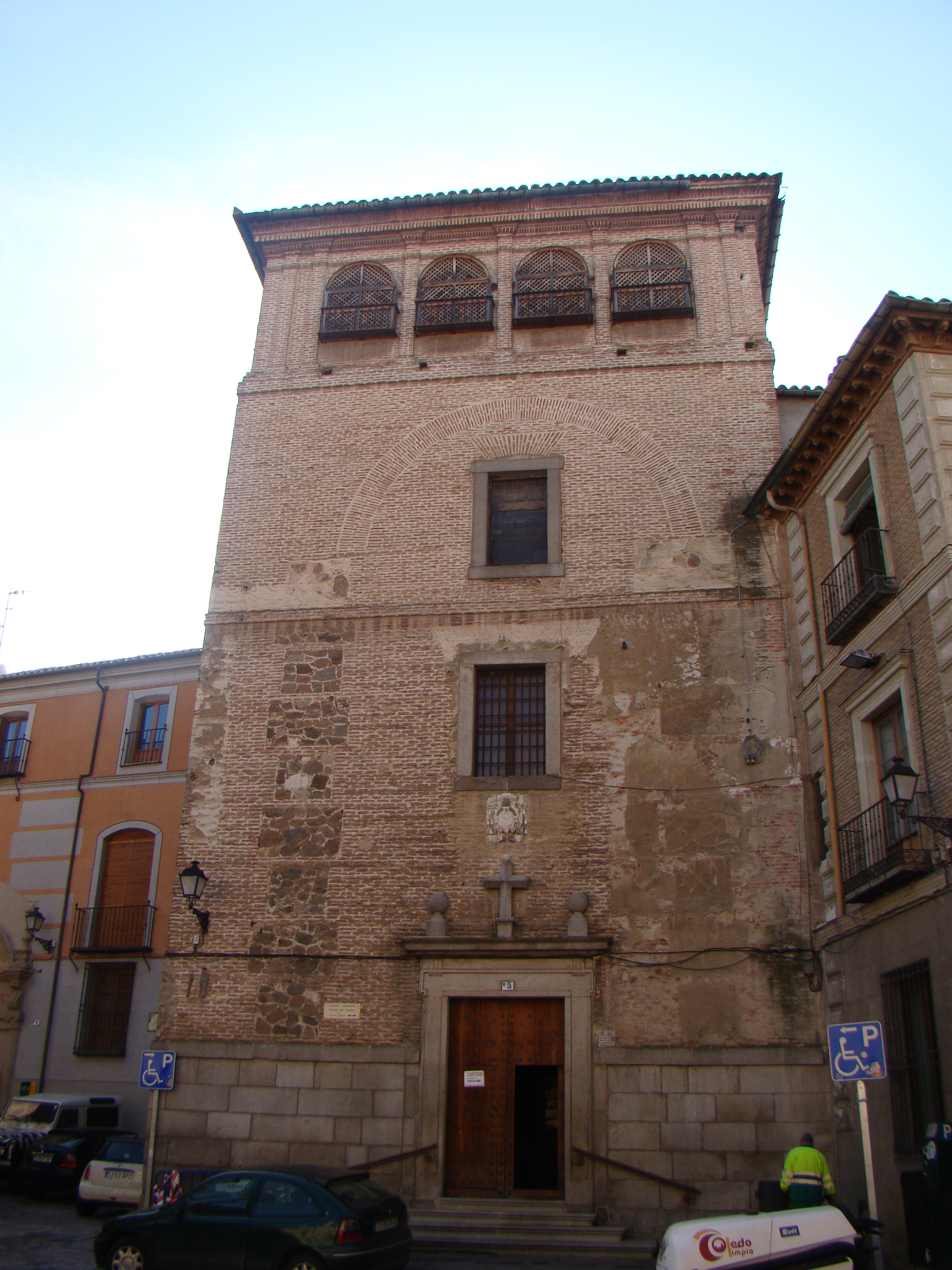
Main facade of the church of the Convento de las Agustinas.

The Convent of the Calced Augustinians (Spanish: Convento de las Agustinas Calzadas) is an Augustinian convent located in Toledo, Spain. The word calzadas translates to "calced" (or shod) in English, referring to the fact that the community wore shoes, rather than going barefoot as other (stricter) religious orders did.

== Architecture ==
The building is designated a Property of Cultural Interest.

The building contains a small central courtyard surrounded by living and working quarters. Architecturally, the convent has had a complicated history. It was begun in the 17th century and was adapted in the mid-18th century from existing structures; paid for by Luis II Fernandez de Cordoba, Count of Teba and Cardinal Archbishop of Toledo between 1755 and 1771.

== Painting ==
The chapel has an altar-piece by the baroque painter Francisco Rizi.

== Note ==
- This contains information taken from the homonymous article in the Spanish Wikipedia.
