= Convento de la Purísima Concepción, Toledo =

Convent in Castile-La Mancha, Spain

Coordinates: 39.8598°N 4.0270°W

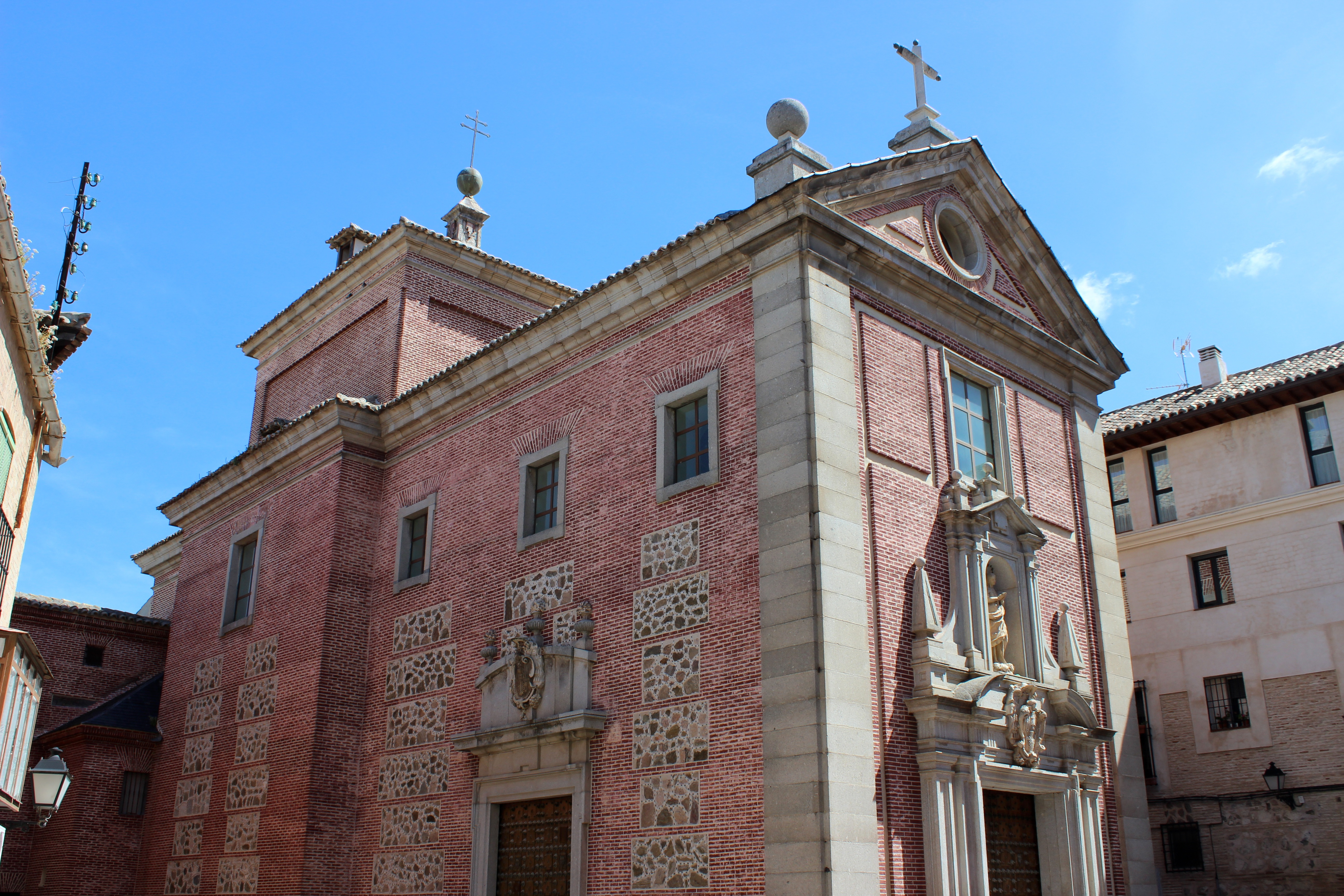
Convento de la Purísima Concepción

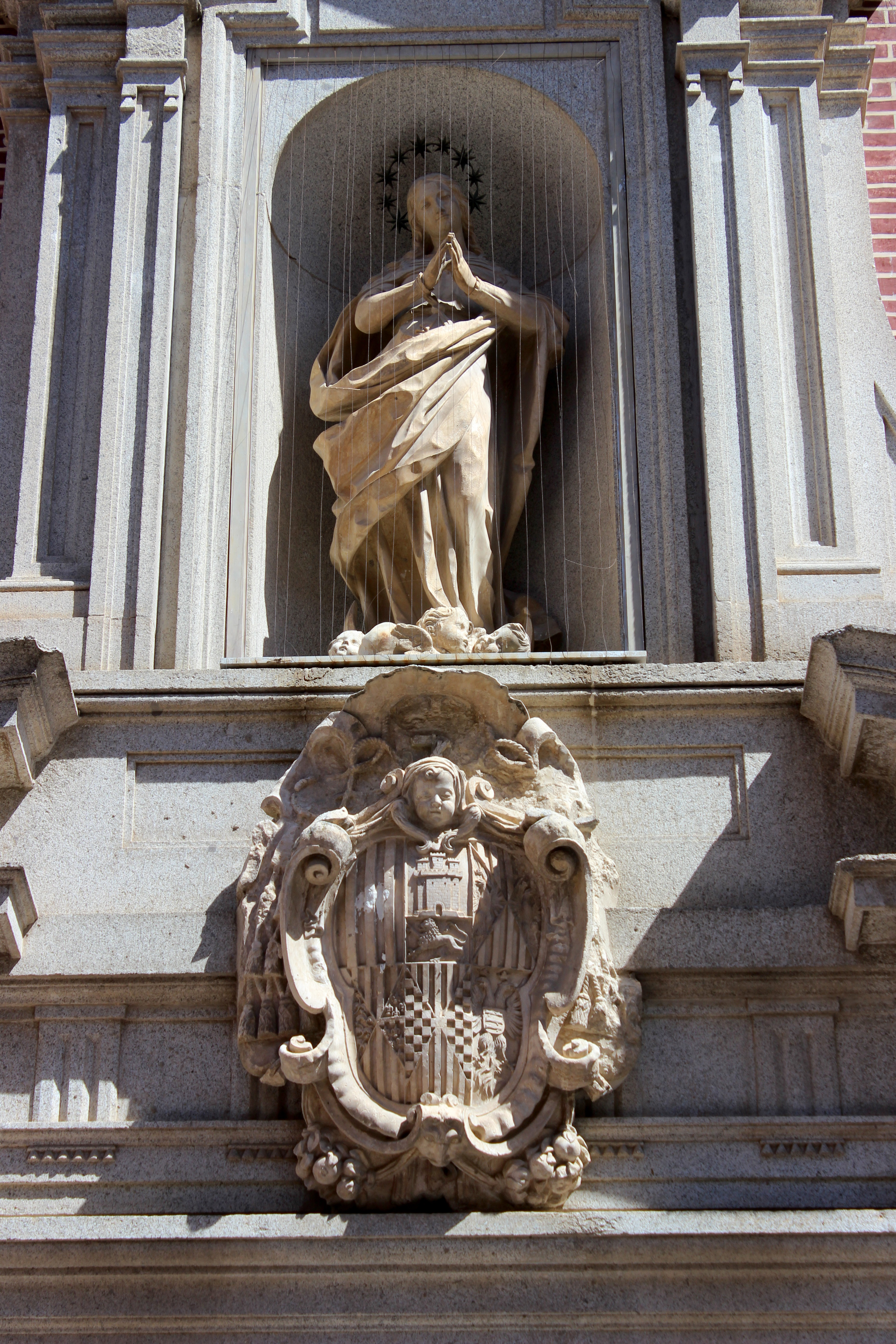
Arms of the portal

The Convento de la Purísima Concepción, also called Convento de Capuchinas, is a convent located in the city of Toledo, in Castile-La Mancha, Spain.

The buildings are late 17th century although the institution developed from an earlier Augustinian community. The chapel was completed by 1671, the year in which it was consecrated; and by 1677, the year when the convent's patron Cardinal Don Pascual de Aragón died, the works of the conventual dependencies were practically finished.

== Description of church ==
Although the transept of the church's crossing protrudes somewhat laterally, the layout cannot be described as a Latin cross. It is essentially rectangular, with a single nave divided in three sections: the crossing, the greater chapel and the choir, high, at the feet, on a wide lowered arch. The nave and the main chapel have half barrel vault ceilings and lunettes; in the transept is a dome on pechinas (pendentives), without drum and with blind lantern. On a base of ashlar masonry there is a limpid and undeveloped interior elevation, articulated by Tuscan pilasters that, extended on the smooth frieze, reach the capitals located directly under the cornices. Four pillars support the dome in the crossing. In comparison, the chancel is raised in a lighter style with pilasters subtly defining the spaces. At the end of the church is the main altarpiece; on the side of the epistle there is a grille on the other side of which is the low choir of the nuns - wide rectangular stay and of low height, whose low ceiling is materially occupied by an enormous shield, frescoed by Francisco Rizi, of the Cardinal Pascual de Aragón, and on the gospel side, the chapel of the Christ.

Fine simplicity and marked lack of ornamentation are the criteria handled throughout the interior. The counterpart is in the nobility of materials - marble, jaspers and bronzes - used for altarpieces, picture frames and plaques with inscriptions.

Each of the details that configure this architectural space is executed with a weighting, exquisiteness and a final finish that surprises; fruit, all of it, of a measured proportion and balance.

The exterior is, in general, of brick seen with rafters of stone, of cubic volumes and rectilinear profiles, as is customary in the 17th-century architecture of Toledo.

== Other buildings ==
Among the conventual dependences is the small cloister, which acts as a distributing element of rooms, formed by two floors of four galleries each, which, through arches of half a point, open to a courtyard.

== Paintings ==
The walls of the nave are decorated with paintings, one by Simón de León Leal, which represents Ferdinand III the Saint before Saint Hermenegild (1670), and another by Carlo Francesco Nuvolone (before 1646) represents the "Assumption of the Virgin". Giovanni Peruzzini, Santa Maria Magdalena de Pazzis, and Giacinto Giminiani, Apparition of the Child to Santa Rosa de Lima, both signed in 1670.
