= Juan Everardo Nithard =

Austrian Jesuit priest (1607–1681)

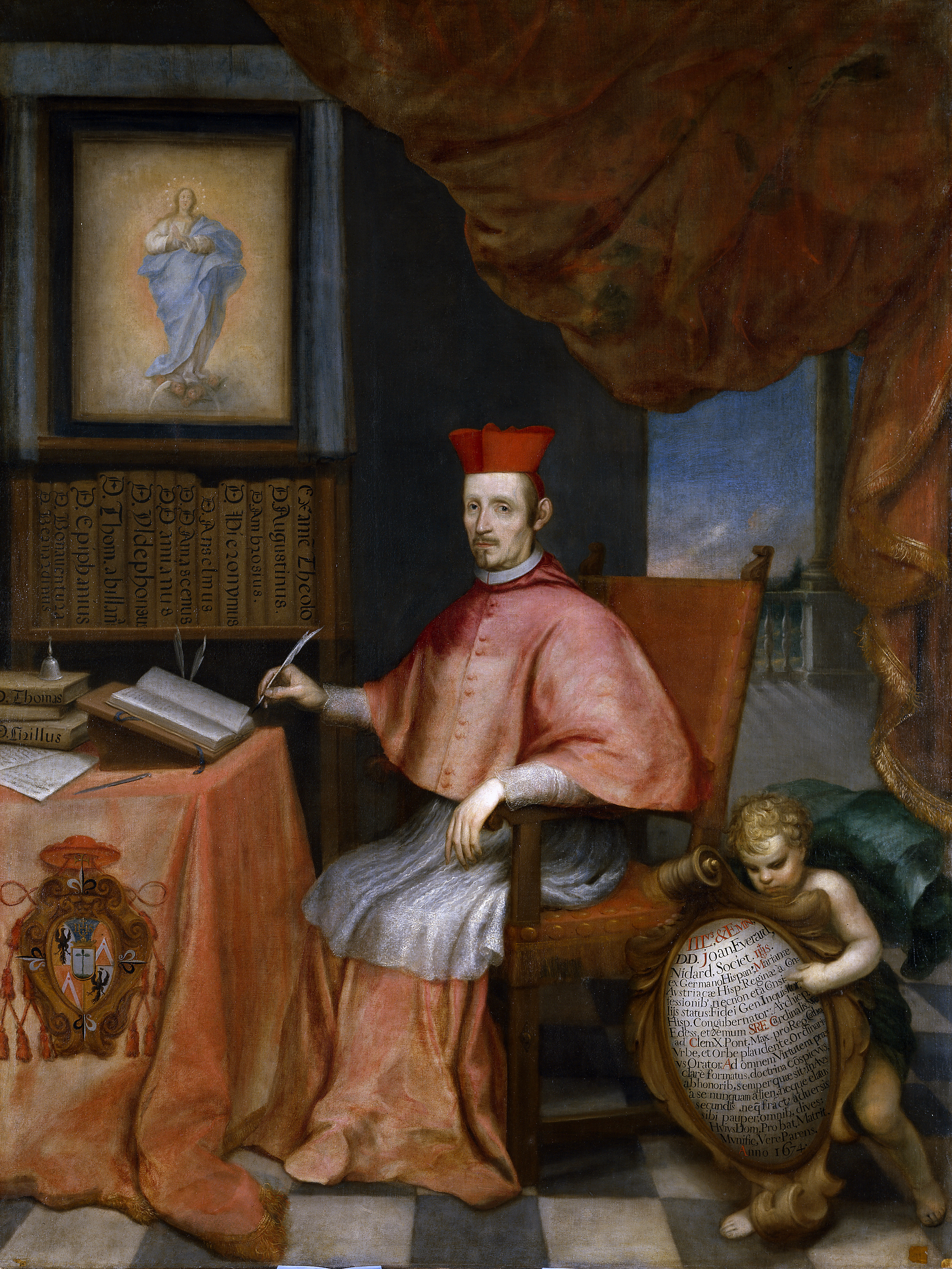
Portrait of Cardinal Juan Everardo Nithard, by Alonso del Arco (c. 1674). Prado Museum (Madrid).

Juan Everardo Nithard SJ (German: Johann Eberhard Nithard) (Falkenstein (Upper Austria), 8 December 1607 – Rome, 1 February 1681) was an Austrian priest of the Society of Jesus, confessor of Mariana of Austria (Queen and Regent of Spain), cardinal, and valido (royal favorite) of Spain.

== Biography ==
Born in a Catholic family in Tirol, at the age of 21 he entered the Society of Jesus and studied at the University of Graz. Emperor Ferdinand III made him preceptor of his children Leopold and Mariana.

When Archduchess Mariana married her maternal uncle King Philip IV of Spain in 1649, Nithard accompanied her as her confessor to the Spanish Court. When the King died, Queen Mariana became regent for her four-year-old son Charles.

She made Nithard Grand Inquisitor in 1666, which gave him access to the Regency Board, from where he became the most important person of the Spanish Court. From then on he was the de facto prime minister or valido of Spain. He allied himself with the influential royal favorite Mariana Engracia Álvarez de Toledo Portugal y Alfonso-Pimentel.

When Nithard signed the disadvantageous Treaty of Lisbon (1668) with Portugal and Treaty of Aix-la-Chapelle (1668) with France, the members of the Councils and in particular John Joseph of Austria started plotting to overthrow him. In 1669 he was dismissed by a military pronunciamiento led by John.

After his dismissal, Nithard was named ambassador in Rome, Bishop of Agrigento, and later Archbishop (Titular bishop) of Edessa. In 1672 Pope Clement X made him a cardinal. He wrote his Memorias, died in 1681, and was buried in the Church of the Gesu in Rome.

== In literature ==
In her Mémoires, Madame d'Aulnoy sketches Nithard's character in recounting the recent history of the Spanish court: Sa naissance était obscure, et son esprit servit presque seul à l'avancement de sa fortune ; il l'avait souple et complaisant, il étudiait le caractère de ceux dont il avait besoin, et il ne s'éloignait jamais de leurs sentiments. transl. His birth was obscure, and his mind was almost the only tool he had in the advancement of his fortune; it was supple and obliging, he studied the character of those of whom he required something, and never distanced himself from their opinions." Madame d'Aulnoy writes about the Queen's close relationship with Nithard, the nobility's resentment of her unilateral decision to name Nithard Grand Inquisitor, as well as the hatred of John Joseph of Austria for the Jesuit, which eventually resulted in the former leading an uprising to oust Nithard.

Catholic Church titles
Preceded by Pascual de Aragón	Grand Inquisitor of Spain; 1666–1669	Succeeded by Diego Sarmiento de Valladares
