= Nuestra Señora de Loreto, Algezares =

Church in Algezares, Spain

Our Lady of Loreto (Spanish: Nuestra Señora de Loreto) is a Roman Catholic parish church located in Plaza Juan XXIII of the pedanía of Algezares, part of the city of Murcia, in the region of Murcia, Spain.

== History ==
A church at the site was known by the 16th century. It is dedicated to the Virgin of Loreto, the patron of the neighborhood. The facade has a Renaissance style portal surmounted by Virgin and Child in the niche above. The bell-tower on the side of the facade has clock.
