= Catalina Fernández de Córdoba-Figueroa y Enríquez de Ribera =

Castilian aristocrat

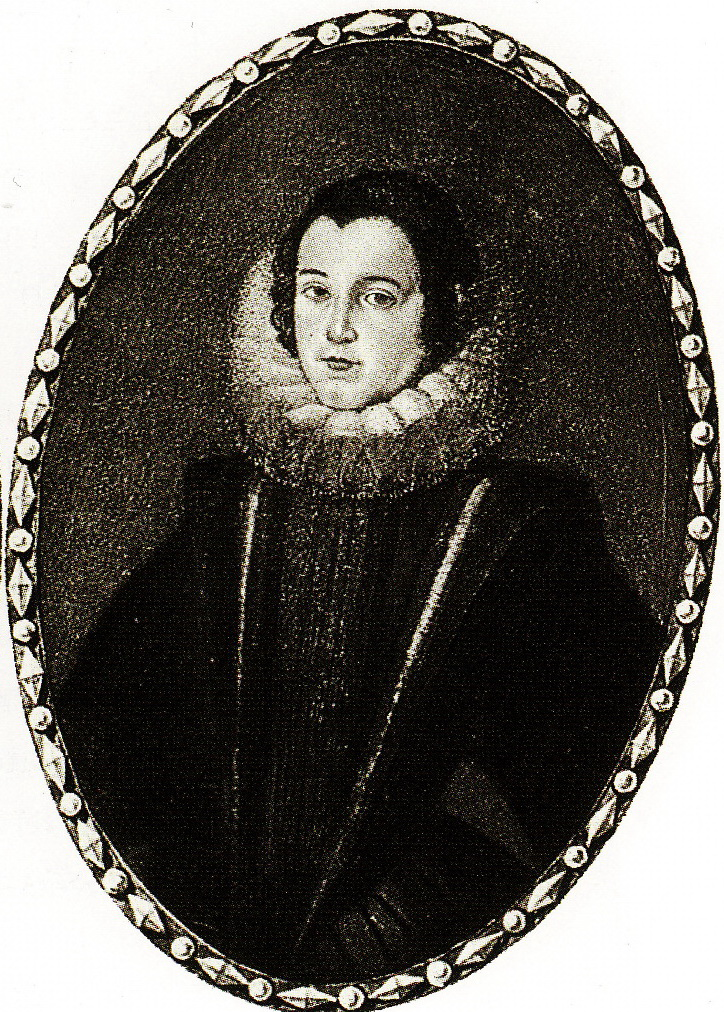
- Catalina Fernandez
- Born: November 4, 1589; Lucena, Córdoba, Spain
- Died: August 11, 1646; Zaragoza
- Occupation: writer

Catalina Fernández de Córdoba-Figueroa y Enríquez de Ribera (November 4, 1589 – August 11, 1646) was a Castilian aristocrat of the lineage of the House of Córdoba.
