= Peace of Münster =

1648 treaty between the Netherlands and Spain

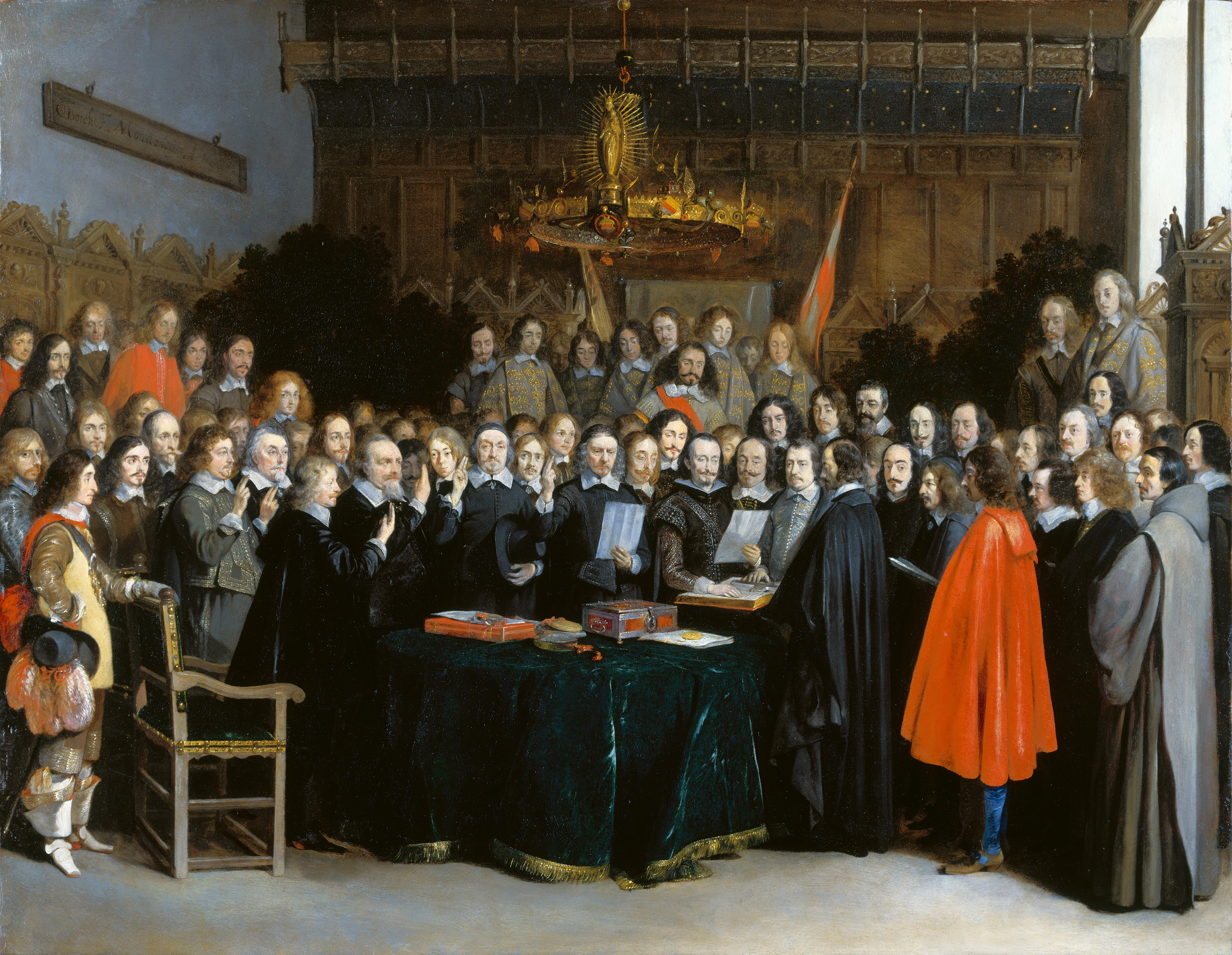
- Ratifying the Peace of Münster
- Context: End of the Eighty Years' War
- Signed: 30 January 1648
- Location: Münster, Germany
- Negotiators: (Habsburg Spain) Gaspar de Bracamonte; (Habsburg Spain) Antoine Brun; (Dutch Republic) Adriaan Pauw; (Dutch Republic) Johan de Knuyt
- Signatories: (Habsburg Spain) Philip IV of Spain; Dutch Republic

The Peace of Münster, signed on 30 January 1648, was a treaty between Philip IV of Spain and the Lords States General of the Dutch Republic. (Note: The Treaty does not use the word Republic but instead recognises the Lords States General as sovereign.) Negotiated in parallel to, but not part of, the Peace of Westphalia, under its terms Spain formally recognised the independent Dutch Republic, and ended the Eighty Years' War.

== Negotiations ==
Negotiations began in 1641 in the town of Münster, in the Holy Roman Empire. With the initiation of Spanish-Dutch peace talks, Dutch trade with the Levant and the Iberian Peninsula began to flourish. Dutch merchants, benefiting from both the availability of relatively cheap shipping and the cessation of hostilities, soon dominated the markets that had been previously dominated by English traders. Dutch merchants would also benefit from the foreign upheavals of the English Civil War and gain on English trade in their American colonies.

While Spain did not recognise the Dutch Republic, it agreed that the Lords States General of the United Netherlands was 'sovereign' and could participate in the peace talks. On the Dutch side this was a result of the immense political pressure from the entire Bicker-De Graeff Clan. Their leaders Andries and Cornelis Bicker, Cornelis and Andries de Graeff from Amsterdam as well as Jacob de Witt from Dordrecht vehemently pushed for this peace. In January 1646, eight Dutch representatives arrived in Münster to begin negotiations; these included two delegates from Holland with one each from the other six provinces. The Spanish envoys were Gaspar de Bracamonte, 3rd Count of Peñaranda and Antoine Brun, who were given wide negotiating authority by Philip IV of Spain.

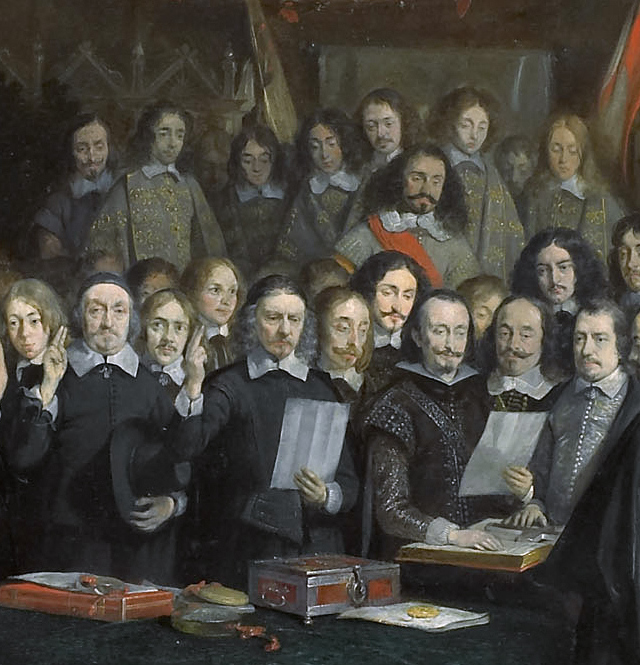
Detail of the Peace of Westphalia in Münster (Gerard Terborch 1648)

On 30 January 1646, Adriaan Pauw and Johan de Knuyt, representing Holland and Zeeland, reached an armistice for twenty years and recognition of State sovereignty. On 8 January 1647, a provisional peace agreement was reached, recognizing the status quo in the East and West Indies, as well as the patents of the Dutch East India Company and the West India Company. In March 1647, Frederick Henry of Orange died. Bicker, Adriaan Pauw and the inner power circle of the States of Holland advocated a drastic reduction in Dutch forces. In July 1647, the Spanish government made a proposal aimed at making Amsterdam the staple market for Spanish silver. In October the States General decided to authorize the admiralties to issue passports for the export of silver imported from Spain. Andries Bicker was involved in the request. He provided ships to transport Spanish silver from Cádiz to the Spanish Netherlands.

The States General sent eight delegates from several of the provinces as none trusted the others to represent them adequately. They were Willem Ripperda (Overijssel), Frans van Donia (Friesland), Adriaen Clant tot Stedum (Groningen), Adriaan Pauw and Jan van Mathenesse (Holland), Barthold van Gent (Gelderland), Johan de Knuyt (Zeeland) and Godert van Reede (Utrecht). The negotiations were held in what is now the Haus der Niederlande in Münster.

=== Outcome ===
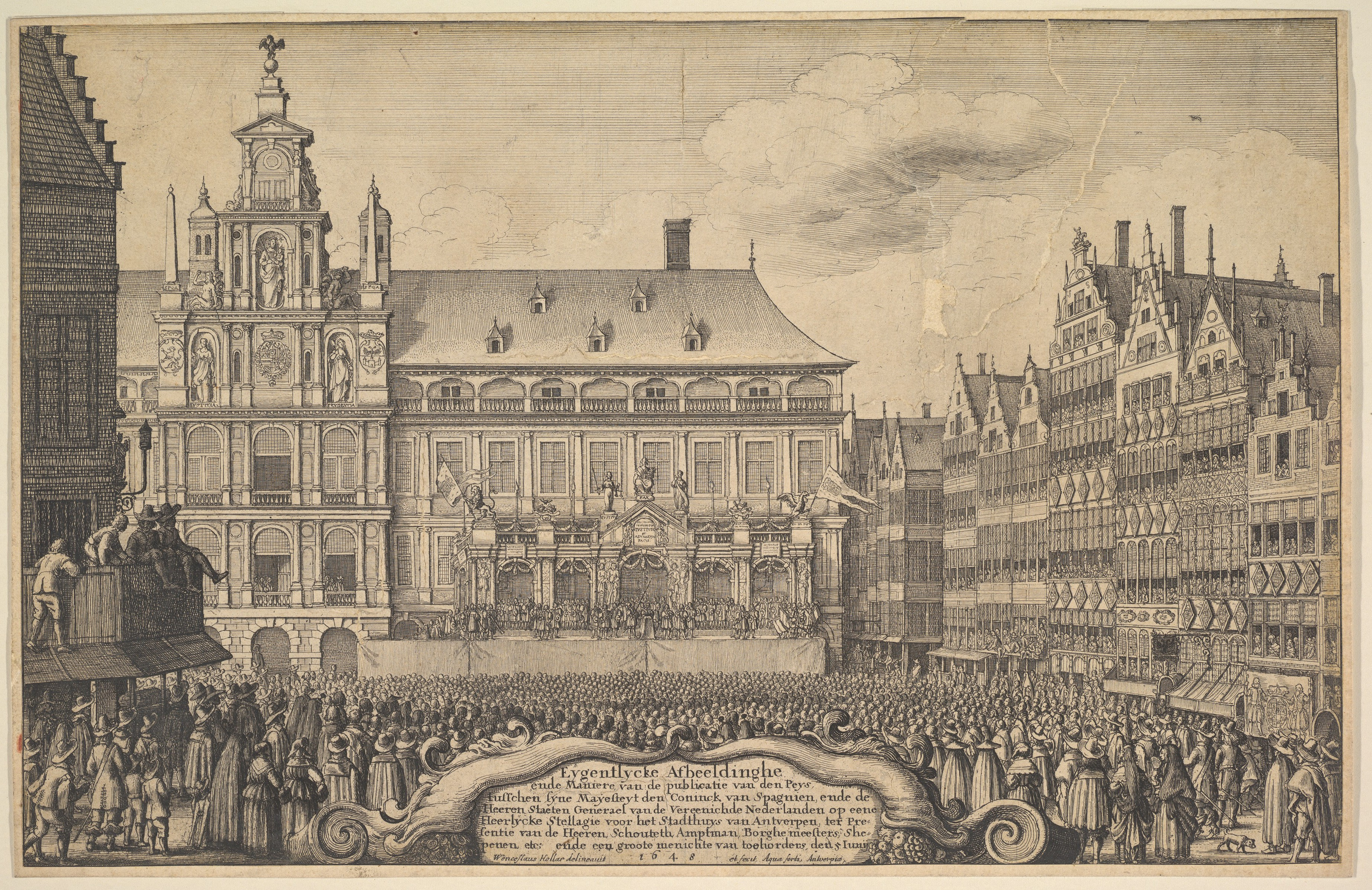
Proclamation of the treaty of Münster by Wenceslaus Hollar

On 30 January 1648, the parties reached agreement and the text sent to The Hague and Madrid for approval. As an immediate consequence of the signing of the treaty, on 4 February the ambassadors of both countries agreed to and signed on to a particular item on the navigation and trade between the two states, her colonies and dominions.

The treaty was ratified by king Philip IV in Madrid on 1 March, and by the Assembly of the States General in The Hague on 18 April and solemnly published and announced in the town hall of Münster on 15 May 1648. The delegate of Zeeland refused to attend, and the delegate of Utrecht suffered a possibly diplomatic illness. The States General narrowly approved the Treaty on 5 June 1648.

The text was adopted in four copies, two in French and two in Dutch. The Utrecht delegate Nederhorst initially refused to put down his signature and seal, but after being forced to do so by his province, he put them on 30 April (although they no longer fit neatly on the document). On 15 May 1648, the peace was definitively signed and solemnly ratified with an oath by Dutch and Spanish envoys, while a huge crowd was spectating the proceedings from the sidelines.

Despite achieving independence, there was considerable opposition to the treaty within the States General since it allowed Spain to retain the Southern Provinces and permitted religious toleration for Catholics. Support from the powerful province of Holland meant it was narrowly approved but these differences resulted in political conflict.

== Contents ==
During the peace talks, negotiators representing the Republic and Spain reached an agreement relatively quickly. The text of the Twelve Years' Truce was taken as the foundation, and this made it much easier to formulate the peace treaty, because many articles could be copied without many changes. If one compares the texts of the Twelve Years' Truce of 1609 to the Peace of Münster of 1648, the articles that correspond in whole or in part are as follows:

Twelve Years' Truce (1609)	Art. 1	2	3	4	5	6	7	8	9	10/11	12	13	14	15	16	17	18	19	20	21	22	23	24	25	26	27	28	29	30	31	32	33	34	36	37	38
Peace of Münster (1648)	Art. 1	2	3	4	5	7	8	17	20	22	23	24	25	31	32	33	34	42	43	46	47	48	51	54	55	56	57	58	59	60	61	62	63	75	77	79

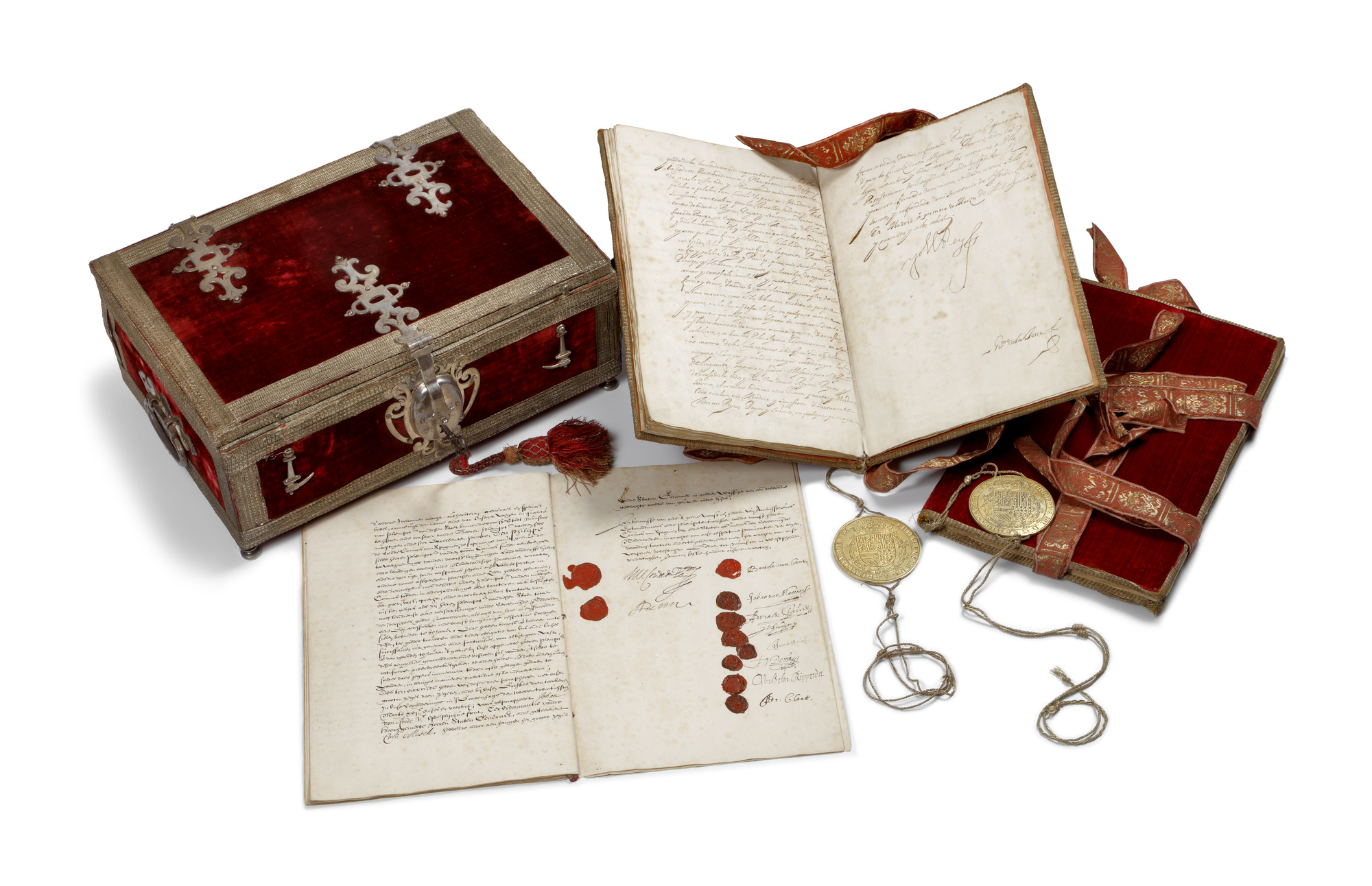
Archives of the peace treaty of Münster with the signatures and personal seals of the negotiators, in the National Archives in The Hague. The treaty is about forty pages in total.

The States-General of the Dutch Republic were formally recognised by Spain as a sovereign entity. This important concession by Spain was therefore the first point. Spain stopped regarding the Republic's inhabitants as rebellious Spanish subjects (which it had done for nearly a century). Peace seemed near. France, with which the Republic had agreed to come to a joint treaty with Spain, hindered progress by constantly coming up with new demands. The States then decided to conclude a separate peace with Spain without France.

=== Copies ===
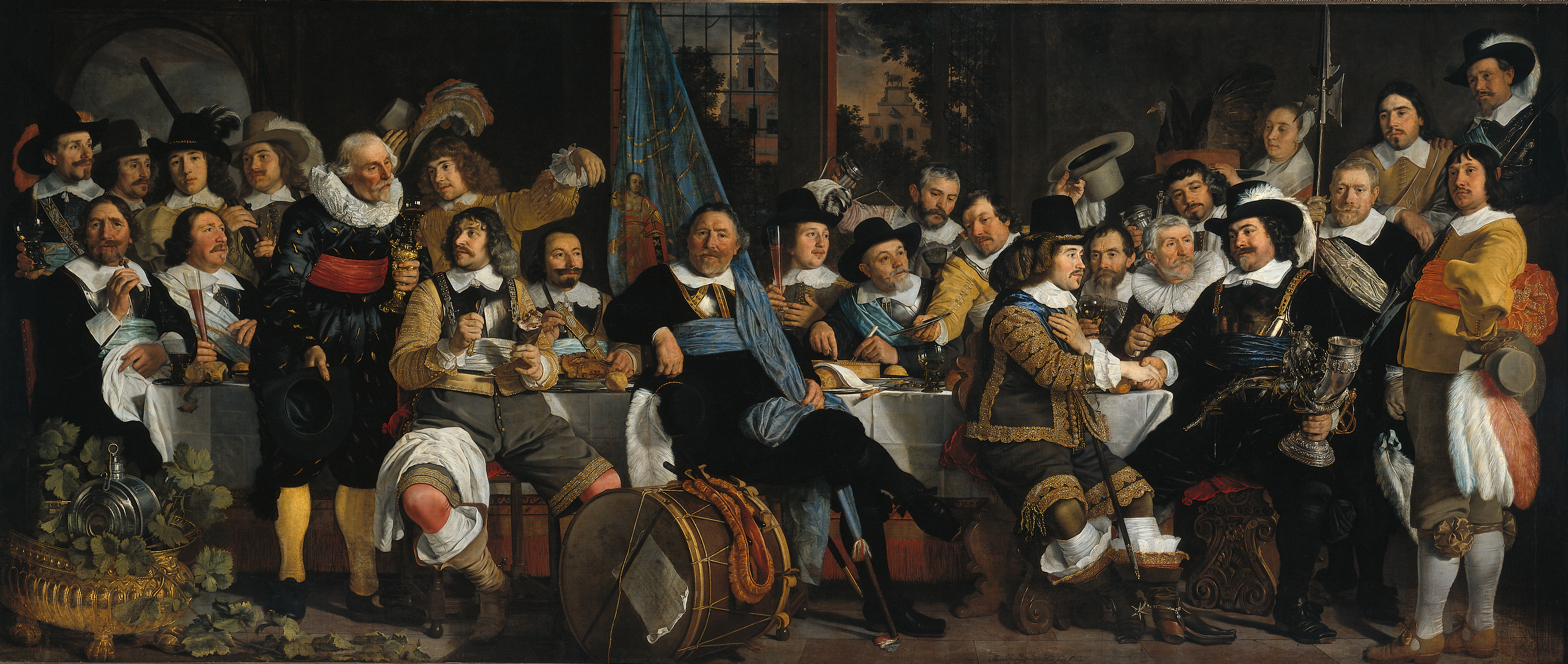
The Celebration of the Peace of Münster (1648) by Bartholomeus van der Helst

In the Netherlands, the National Archives in The Hague keeps two copies of the Peace of Münster, a Dutch-language one ("NL-HaNA 1.01.02 12588.55B"), and a Francophone version ("NL-HaNA 1.01.02 12588.55C"). Both versions are provided by the Spanish side with French-language ratifications, both signed by King Philip IV – one in Spanish with Yo el Rey ("I the King"), the other in French with Philippe ("Philip") – and both bearing his seal in solid gold. They are on display in the archive's exhibition room. The Archivo General de Simancas in Spain preserves the other Dutch-language copy ("ES.47161.AGS//EST,LEG,2943,27") and the other French-language copy ("ES.47161.AGS//EST,LEG,2943,28").

== See also ==
- Act of Abjuration
- Thirty Years' War ended with Peace of Westphalia, consisting of the Treaty of Münster and the Treaty of Osnabrück

== Bibliography ==
- Boer, H. W. J. de, H. Bruch en H. Krol (red.) Adriaan Pauw (1585–1653); staatsman en ambachtsheer. Heemstede, VOHB, 1985
- Groenveld, Simon (2009). Unie – Bestand – Vrede. Drie fundamentele wetten van de Republiek der Verenigde Nederlanden. Hilversum: Uitgeverij Verloren. p. 200. ISBN 9789087041274. (in cooperation with H.L.Ph. Leeuwenberg and H.B. van der Weel)
- Israel, Jonathan (1995). The Dutch Republic: Its Rise, Greatness, and Fall 1477–1806. Oxford: Clarendon Press. ISBN 0-19-873072-1.
- Lesaffer, Randall (2006). "Siege Warfare and the Early Modern Laws of War". Ius Brabanticum, ius commune, ius gentium (PDF). pp. 87–109.
- Manzano Baena, Laura (Winter 2007), "Negotiating Sovereignty: The Peace Treaty of Münster, 1648", History of Political Thought, Volume 28, Number 4, pp. 617–641. JSTOR 26222899.
- Mulder, Liek; Doedens, Anne; Kortlever, Yolande (2008). Geschiedenis van Nederland, van prehistorie tot heden. Baarn: HBuitgevers. p. 288. ISBN 9789055746262.
- Poelhekke, J. J. De vrede van Munster. 's-Gravenhage, Martinus Nijhoff, 1948.
