= Peace of Westphalia =

1648 treaties ending the Thirty Years' War and Eighty Years' War

Treaties of Osnabrück and Münster
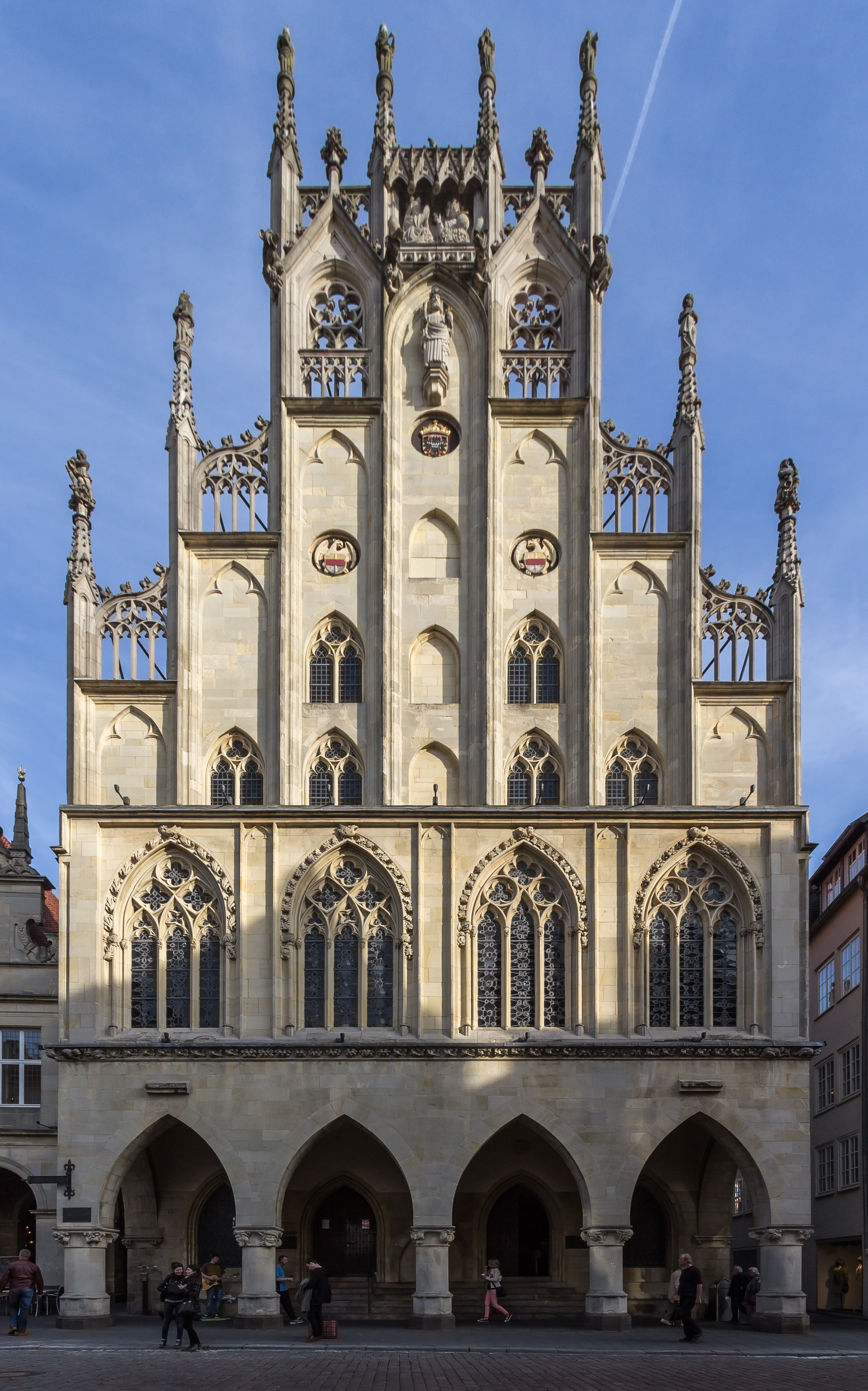
- The historic town hall of Münster where the treaty was signed
- Type: Peace treaty
- Context: Thirty Years' War
- Drafted: 1646–1648
- Signed: 24 October 1648
- Location: Osnabrück and Münster, Westphalia, Holy Roman Empire
- Parties: 109
- Languages: Latin

The Peace of Westphalia (German: Westfälischer Friede, pronounced [vɛstˈfɛːlɪʃɐ ˈfʁiːdə]) is the collective name for two peace treaties signed in October 1648 in the Westphalian cities of Osnabrück and Münster. They ended the Thirty Years' War (1618–1648) and brought peace to the Holy Roman Empire, closing a calamitous period of European history that killed between 4.5 and 8 million people. Ferdinand III, Holy Roman Emperor, the kingdoms of France and Sweden, and their respective allies among the princes of the Holy Roman Empire, participated in the treaties.

The negotiation process was lengthy and complex. Talks took place in two cities because each side wanted to meet on territory under its own control. A total of 109 delegations arrived to represent the belligerent states, but not all delegations were present at the same time. Two treaties were signed to end the war in the Empire: the Treaty of Münster and the Treaty of Osnabrück. These treaties ended the Thirty Years' War in the Holy Roman Empire, with the Habsburgs (rulers of Austria and Spain) and their Catholic allies on one side, battling the Protestant powers (Sweden and certain Holy Roman principalities) allied with France (though Catholic, strongly anti-Habsburg under King Louis XIV).

Several scholars of international relations have identified the Peace of Westphalia as the origin of principles crucial to modern international relations, collectively known as Westphalian sovereignty. However, some historians have argued against this, suggesting that such views emerged during the nineteenth and twentieth centuries in relation to concerns about sovereignty during that time. Regardless of whether the Peace of Westphalia was a critical juncture or not, narratives about the Peace of Westphalia have profoundly shaped international legal and political thought in subsequent centuries.

== Background ==
Europe had been battered by both the Thirty Years' War and the overlapping Eighty Years' War (begun c. 1568), exacting a heavy toll in money and lives. The Eighty Years' War was a prolonged struggle for the independence of the Protestant-majority Dutch Republic (the modern Netherlands), supported by Protestant-majority England, against Catholic-dominated Spain and Portugal. The Thirty Years' War was the most deadly of the European wars of religion, centered on the Holy Roman Empire. The war, which developed into four phases, included a large number of domestic and foreign players, siding either with the Catholic League or the Protestant Union (later Heilbronn League). The Peace of Prague (1635) ended most religious aspects of the war, and the French–Habsburg rivalry gained prominence. With between 4.5 million and 8 million dead in the Thirty Years' War alone, and decades of constant warfare, the need for peace became increasingly clear.

== Locations ==
Peace negotiations between France and the Habsburg Emperor began in Cologne in 1636. These negotiations were initially blocked by Cardinal Richelieu of France, who insisted on the inclusion of all his allies, whether fully sovereign countries or states within the Holy Roman Empire. In Hamburg, Sweden, France, and the Holy Roman Empire negotiated a preliminary peace in December 1641. They declared that the preparations of Cologne and the Treaty of Hamburg were preliminaries of an overall peace agreement.

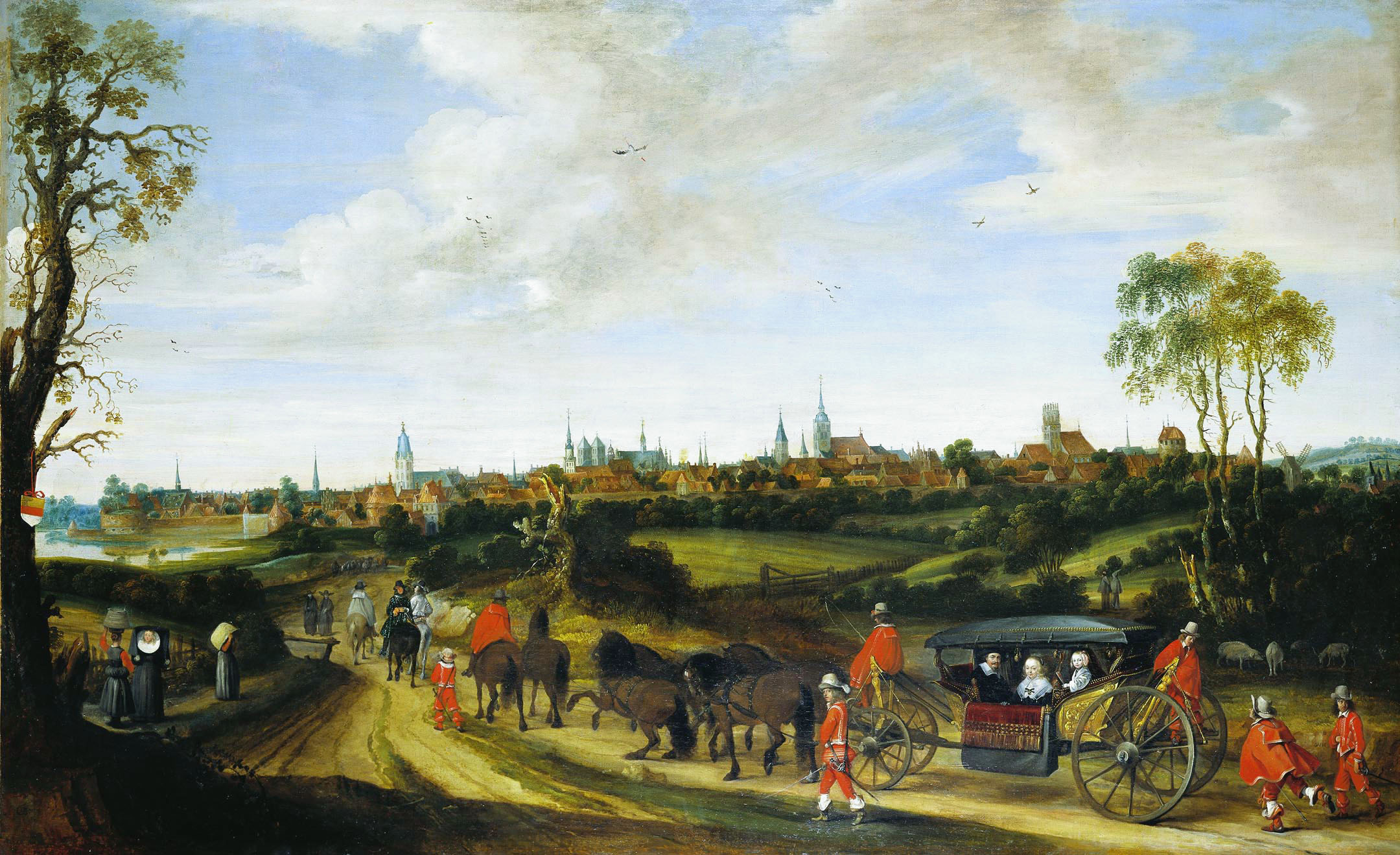
Dutch envoy Adriaan Pauw enters Münster around 1646 for the peace negotiations.

The main peace negotiations took place in Westphalia, in the neighbouring cities of Münster and Osnabrück. Both cities were maintained as neutral and demilitarized zones for the negotiations.

In Münster, negotiations took place between the Holy Roman Empire and France, as well as between the Dutch Republic and Spain who on 30 January 1648 signed a peace treaty ending the Eighty Years' War that was not part of the Peace of Westphalia. Münster had been, since its re-Catholicism in 1535, a strictly mono-denominational community. It housed the Chapter of the Prince-Bishopric of Münster. Only Roman Catholic worship was permitted, while Calvinism and Lutheranism were prohibited.

Sweden preferred to negotiate with the Holy Roman Empire in Osnabrück, which was controlled by Protestant forces. Osnabrück was a bi-denominational Lutheran and Catholic city, with two Lutheran churches and two Catholic churches. The city council was exclusively Lutheran, and the burghers mostly so, but the city also housed the Catholic Chapter of the Prince-Bishopric of Osnabrück and had many other Catholic inhabitants. Osnabrück had been subjugated by troops of the Catholic League from 1628 to 1633 and was then taken by Lutheran Sweden.

== Delegations ==
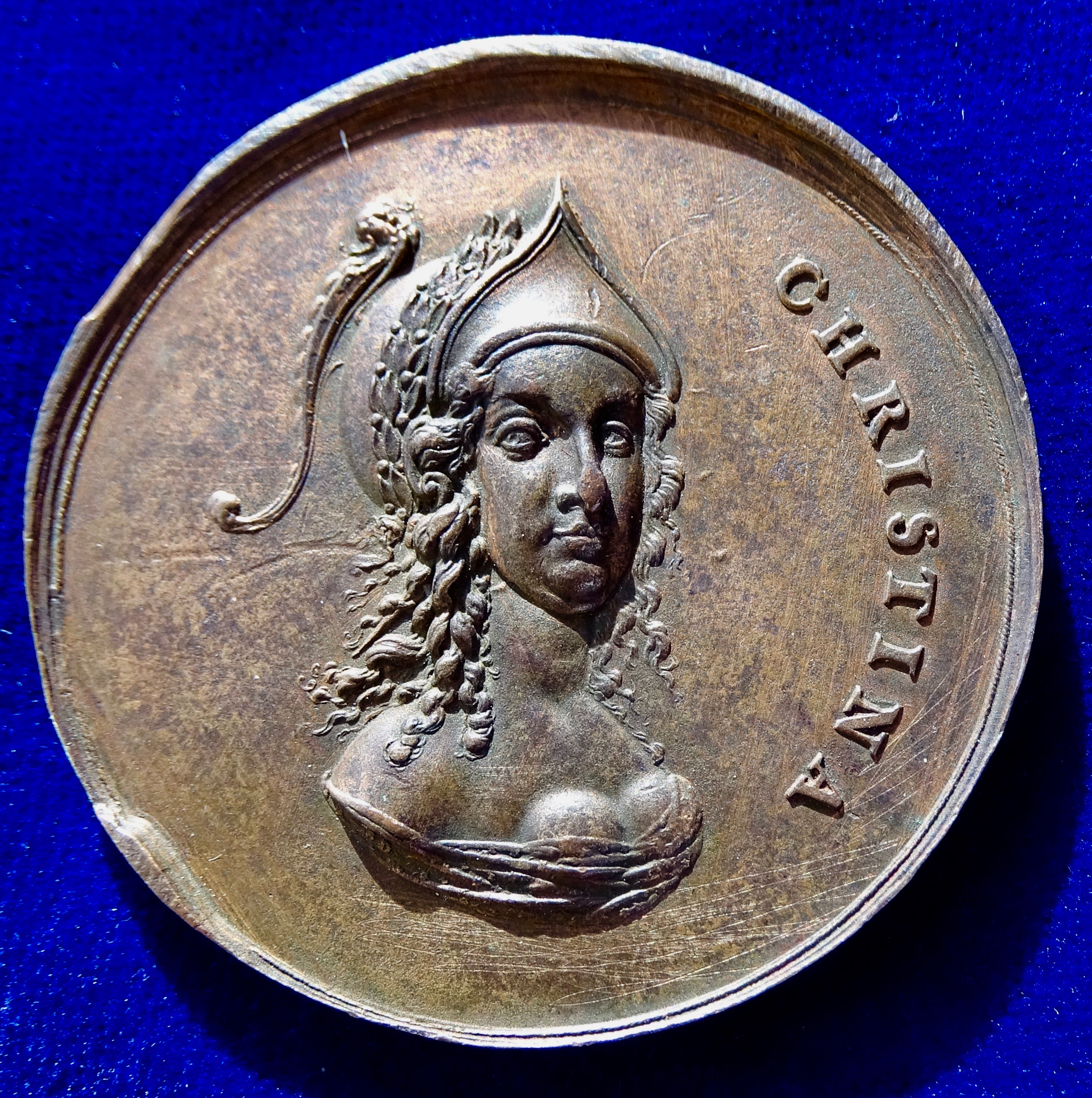
Sebastian Dadler undated medal (1648), Christina of Sweden, portrait with feathered helmet right. Obverse

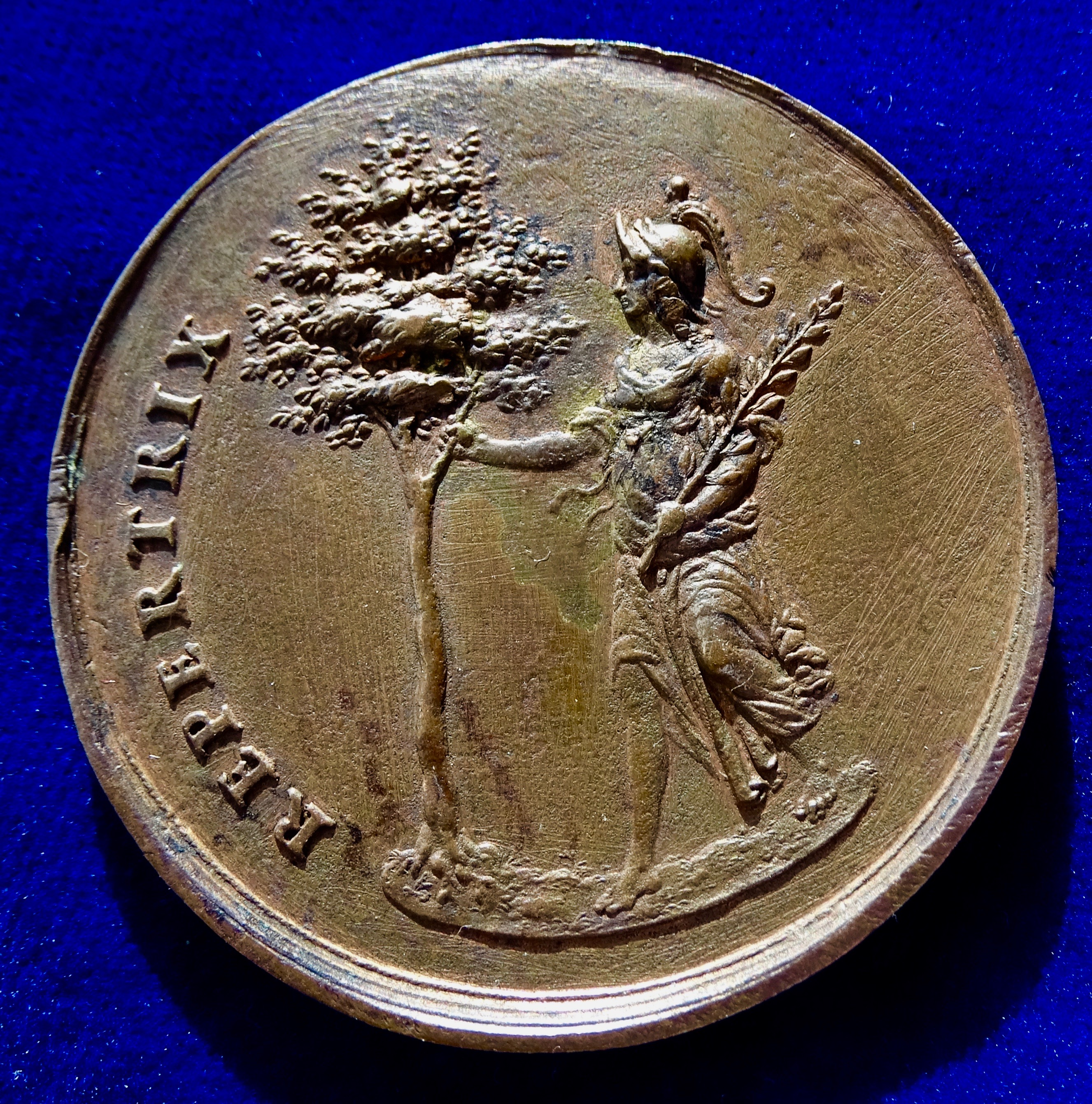
The reverse of this medal: Christina of Sweden as Minerva holding an olive branch in her left arm and grasping the tree of knowledge with her right hand.

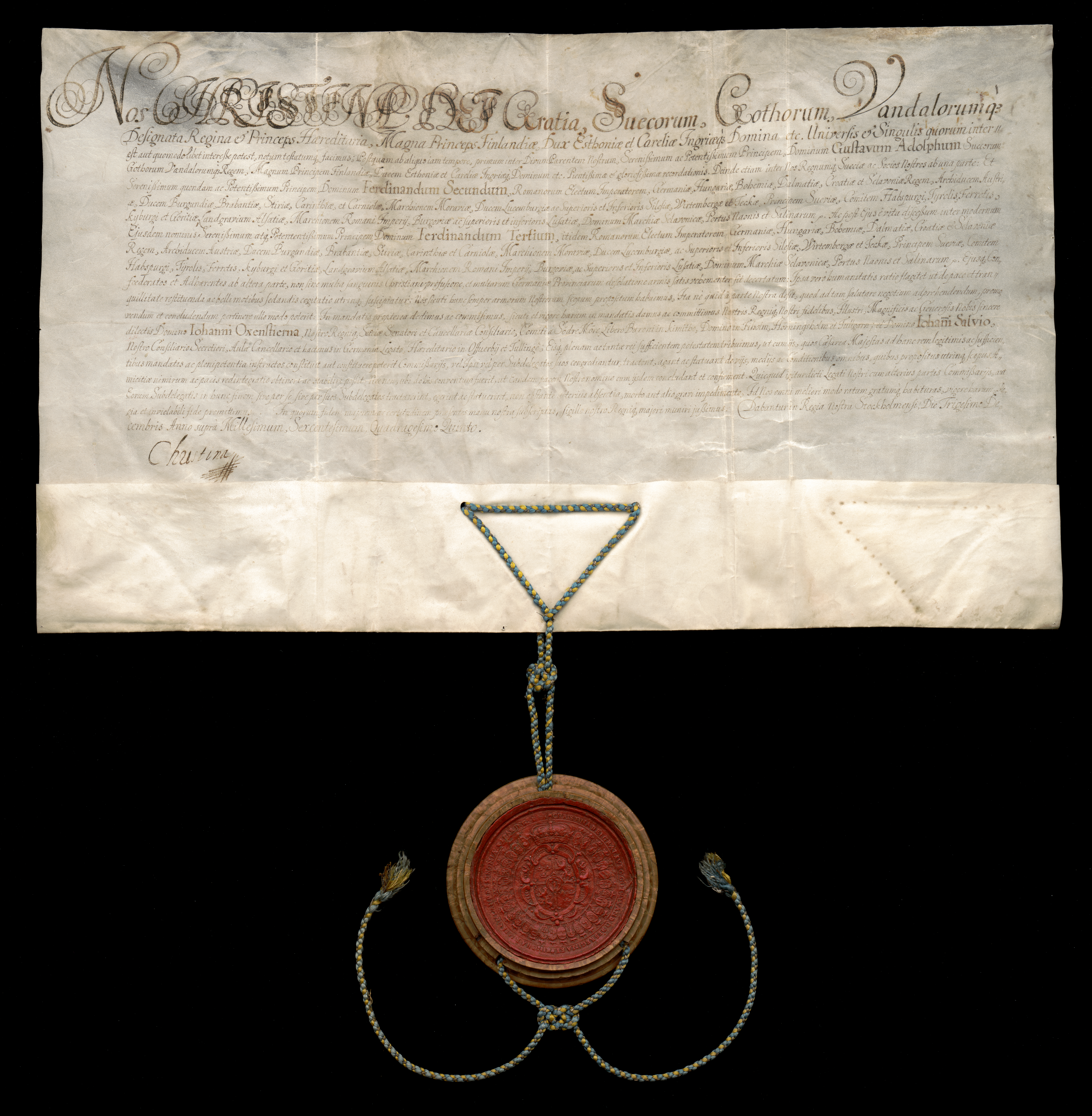
Peace treaty of Osnabrück, October 24, 1648

The peace negotiations had no exact beginning or end, because the 109 delegations never met in a plenary session. Instead, various delegations arrived between 1643 and 1646 and left between 1647 and 1649. The largest number of diplomats were present between January 1646 and July 1647.

Delegations had been sent by 16 European states, 66 Imperial States representing the interests of 140 Imperial States, and 27 interest groups representing 38 groups.

- The French delegation was headed by Henri II d'Orléans, Duke of Longueville and further comprised the diplomats Claude d'Avaux and Abel Servien.
- The Swedish delegation was headed by Count Johan Oxenstierna and was assisted by Baron Johan Adler Salvius.
- The Imperial delegation was headed by Count Maximilian von Trautmansdorff. His aides were:
  - In Münster, Johann Ludwig von Nassau-Hadamar and Isaak Volmar.
  - In Osnabrück, Johann Maximilian von Lamberg and Reichshofrat Johann Krane.
- Philip IV of Spain was represented by two delegations:
  - The Spanish delegation was headed by Gaspar de Bracamonte y Guzmán, and notably included the diplomats and writers Diego de Saavedra Fajardo, and Bernardino de Rebolledo.
  - The County of Burgundy and the Spanish Netherlands were represented by Joseph de Bergaigne (who died before peace was concluded) and Antoine Brun.
- The papal nuncio in Cologne, Fabio Chigi, and the Venetian envoy, Alvise Contarini, acted as mediators.
- Various Imperial Estates of the Holy Roman Empire also sent delegations; among these Johann Ernst Pistoris represented the Electorate of Saxony, Johann VIII zu Sayn-Wittgenstein the Margraviate of Brandenburg, and Georg Christoph von Haslang the Electorate of Bavaria. Important Protestant envoys were Wolfgang Conrad von Thumbshirn for Saxe-Altenburg and Jakob Lampadius for Brunswick-Lüneburg. The Catholic estates were divided between those willing to compromise like Mainz represented by Hugo Eberhard Kratz von Scharfenstein, and Catholic hardliners like Franz Wilhelm von Wartenberg for the Electorate of Cologne.
- The Dutch Republic sent a delegation of six, including two delegates from the province of Holland, including Adriaan Pauw, and Willem Ripperda from the province of Overijssel; two provinces were absent.
- The Swiss Confederacy was represented by Johann Rudolf Wettstein.
- The Portuguese delegations did not participate, as Spain threatened to withdraw from all negotiations, largely due to the still ongoing Portuguese Restoration War.

== Treaties ==
Two separate treaties constituted the peace settlement:

- The Treaty of Münster (Instrumentum Pacis Monasteriensis, IPM), between the Holy Roman Emperor and France, along with their respective allies
- The Treaty of Osnabrück (Instrumentum Pacis Osnabrugensis, IPO), between the Holy Roman Emperor and Sweden, along with their respective allies

== Results ==
=== Westphalia pertaining to the Holy Roman Empire ===
Much of the Peace of Westphalia focused on reorganizing the Holy Roman Empire, the main battleground of the Thirty Years' War.

A common idea is that Emperor Ferdinand III was stripped of power, and said power was given to the rulers of the Imperial estates. The extent to which Ferdinand's power was diminished is now challenged by modern research, with some saying that Ferdinand's loss of influence was overstated by older literature. The emperor still maintained significant power in the Imperial Diet, for example. Central authority was still maintained through institutions like the Aulic Council.

Westphalia guaranteed the right to practice any of the recognized denominations: Catholicism, Lutheranism, and Calvinism. The last was finally given legal recognition as an official religion. The independence of the Dutch Republic, which practiced religious tolerance, also provided a safe haven for European Jews.

Contrary to common belief, the Peace of Westphalia did not necessarily reconfirm the status of the Peace of Augsburg (particularly the principle of cuius regio, eius religio). Rather, it provided a reinterpretation.

What has been established by this treaty [of Westphalia], with the mutual agreement of the parties, concerning certain disputed articles in the Treaty of Augsburg, shall be regarded as a permanently valid interpretation of that treaty. This interpretation must be followed in court and elsewhere until religious matters can, with God's grace, be resolved. This applies regardless of any objection or protest by anyone, whether clergy or laypeople, within or outside the Empire, at any time. All such objections are declared null and void by the terms of this treaty.

Rather than confirming the Augsburg settlement's policy of ius reformandi (in which subjects were to follow their ruler's religion), Westphalia replaced it with an interpretation that sovereign rulers such as princes could no longer dictate the religion of their subjects. "Whatever sovereignty the electors, princes, and estates of the Holy Roman Empire enjoyed in their territories, the private exercise of religion was no longer subject to this sovereignty but had effectively been removed from the sovereign domain."

The Holy See was very displeased at the settlement, with Pope Innocent X calling it "null, void, invalid, iniquitous, unjust, damnable, reprobate, inane, empty of meaning and effect for all time" in the papal brief Zelo Domus Dei.

The Peace of Westphalia also set up new rules for the Reichskammergericht (Imperial Chamber Court), and stipulated that half its judges must be Protestant. Westphalia also called for 50 judges to be appointed, but this number was rarely reached due to financial issues.

=== Tenets ===
The main tenets of the Peace of Westphalia were:

- Ius reformandi was removed: Subjects were no longer forced to follow the religion of their ruler. Rulers were allowed to choose between Catholicism, Lutheranism, and Calvinism.
- 1 January 1624 was defined as the normative date for determining the official religion of a state (though as stated above, subjects did not need to follow the designated official religion). This law was engrained into Imperial law, meaning individual princes could not abolish it. Ecclesiastical property was to be restored to the condition of 1624.
- France and Sweden were recognised as guarantors of the imperial constitution with a right to intercede.

=== Territorial adjustments ===
The Holy Roman Empire in 1648, after the territorial adjustments made by the Peace of Westphalia

- France retained the bishoprics of Metz, Toul, and Verdun near Lorraine, received the cities of the Décapole in Alsace (except for Strasbourg, the Bishopric of Strasbourg, and Mulhouse) and the city of Pignerol near the Spanish Duchy of Milan.
- Sweden received an indemnity of five million thalers, which it used primarily to pay its troops. Sweden further received Western Pomerania (thenceforth Swedish Pomerania), Wismar, and the Prince-Bishoprics of Bremen and Verden as hereditary fiefs, thus gaining a seat and vote in the Imperial Diet of the Holy Roman Empire as well as in the Upper Saxon, Lower Saxon, and Westphalian circle diets (Kreistage). However, the wording of the treaties was ambiguous:

- To escape incorporation into Swedish Bremen-Verden, the city of Bremen had claimed Imperial immediacy. The emperor had granted this request and separated the city from the surrounding Bishopric of Bremen. Sweden launched the Swedish-Bremen wars in 1653/54 in a failed attempt to take the city.
- The treaty did not decide the Swedish-Brandenburgian border in the Duchy of Pomerania. At Osnabrück, both Sweden and Brandenburg had claimed the whole duchy, which had been under Swedish control since 1630 despite legal claims of Brandenburgian succession. While the parties settled for a border in 1653, the underlying conflict continued.
- The treaty ruled that the Dukes of Mecklenburg, owing their re-investiture to the Swedes, cede Wismar and the Mecklenburgian port tolls. While Sweden understood this to include the tolls of all Mecklenburgian ports, the Mecklenburgian dukes as well as the emperor understood this to refer to Wismar only.
- Wildeshausen, a petty exclave of Bremen-Verden and fragile basis for Sweden's seat in the Westphalian circle diet, was also claimed by the Prince-Bishopric of Münster.

- Bavaria retained the Palatinate's vote in the Electoral College of the Holy Roman Empire, which it was granted by the imperial ban on the Elector Palatine Frederick V in 1623. The Prince Palatine, Frederick's son, was given a new, eighth electoral vote.
- The Palatinate was divided between the re-established Elector Palatine Charles I Louis (son and heir of Frederick V) and Maximilian I, Elector of Bavaria, and thus between the Protestants and Catholics. Charles I Louis obtained the Lower Palatinate, along the Rhine, while Maximilian kept the Upper Palatinate, to the north of Bavaria.
- Brandenburg-Prussia received Farther Pomerania, and the Bishoprics of Magdeburg, Halberstadt, Kammin, and Minden.
- The Prince-Bishopric of Osnabrück would alternate between Catholic and Lutheran bishops, with the Protestant bishops chosen from the cadets of the House of Brunswick-Lüneburg.
- The Swiss Confederacy attained legal independence from the Holy Roman Empire, although it had been de facto independent since the Treaty of Basel (1499).
- Barriers to trade and commerce erected during the war were abolished, and "a degree" of free navigation was guaranteed on the Rhine.

== Legacy ==
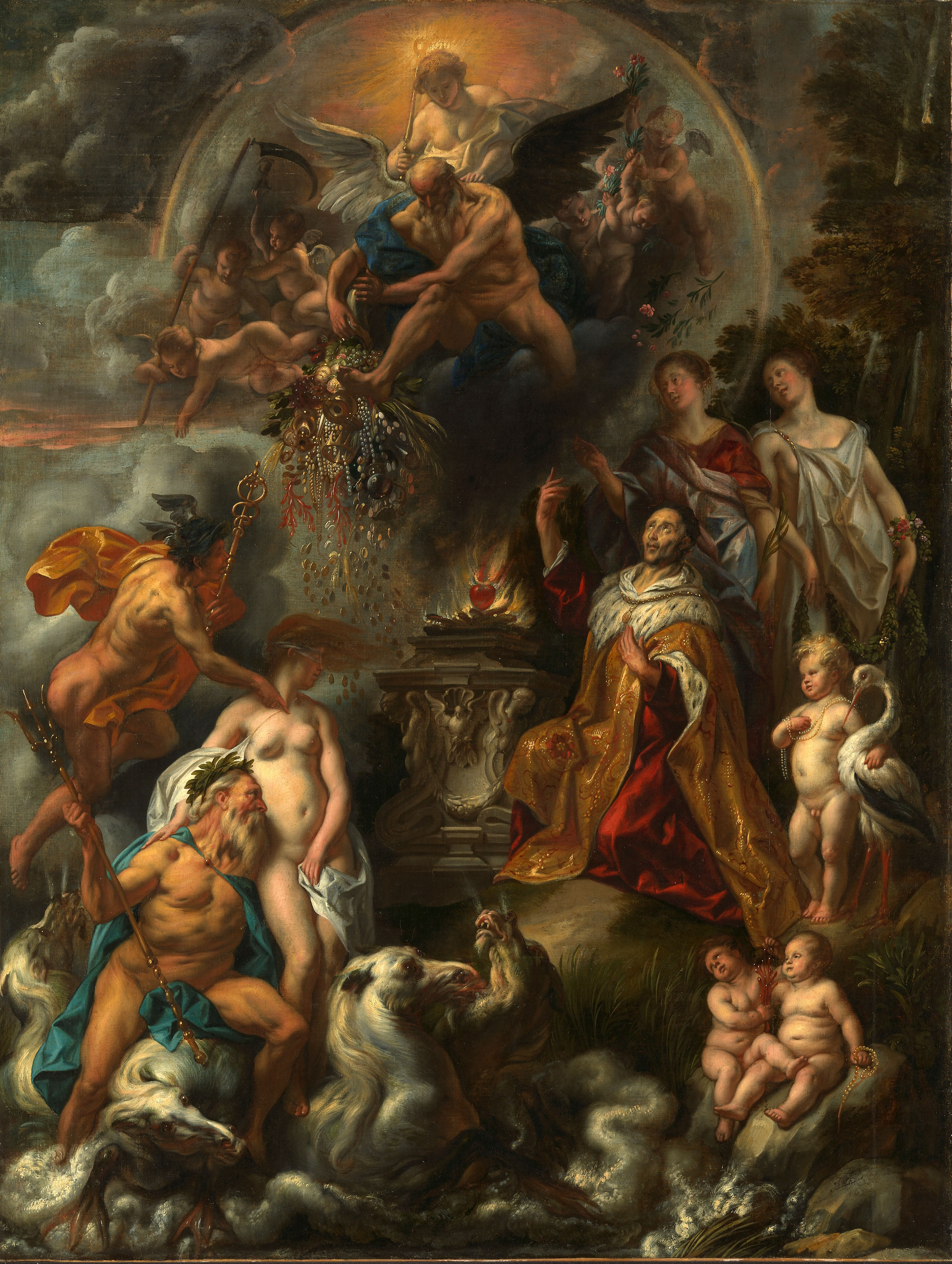
Allegory of the Peace of Westphalia, by Jacob Jordaens

The treaties did not entirely end conflicts arising out of the Thirty Years' War. Fighting continued between France and Spain until the Treaty of the Pyrenees in 1659. The Dutch-Portuguese War that had begun during the Iberian Union between Spain and Portugal, as part of the Eighty Years' War, went on until 1663. The Portuguese Restoration War also continued until 1668. Nevertheless, the Peace of Westphalia did settle many outstanding European issues of the time.

=== Westphalian sovereignty ===
Some scholars of international relations have identified the Peace of Westphalia as the origin of principles crucial to modern international relations, including the inviolability of borders and non-interference in the domestic affairs of sovereign states. This system became known in the literature as Westphalian sovereignty. Most modern historians have challenged the association of this system with the Peace of Westphalia, calling it the "Westphalian myth". They have challenged the view that the modern European states system originated with the Westphalian treaties. The treaties do not contain anything in their text about religious freedom, sovereignty, or balance of power that can be construed as international law principles. Constitutional arrangements of the Holy Roman Empire are the only context in which sovereignty and religious equality are mentioned in the text, but they are not new ideas in this context. While the treaties do not contain the basis for the modern laws of nations themselves, they do symbolize the end of a long period of religious conflict in Europe.

== See also ==
- Churches of Peace
- Eighty Years' War
- Freedom of religion
- History of Sweden, 1648–1700
- List of treaties
- Peace of Augsburg
- Peace of Münster
- Thirty Years' War
- Westphalian sovereignty
