= Widdelswehr =

- District of Emden
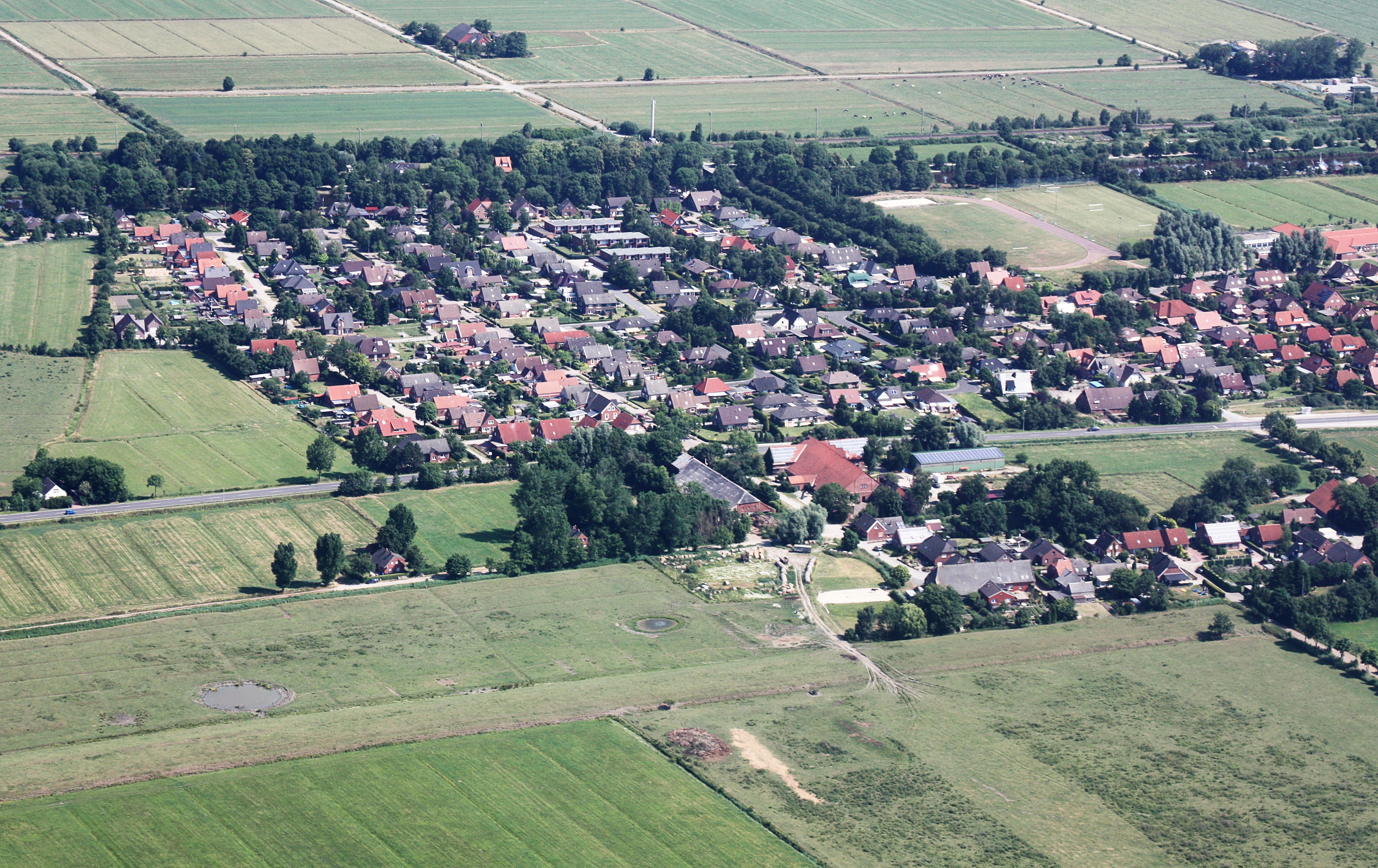
- Aerial view of Widdelswehr

- Location of Widdelswehr-Jarßum within Emden
- Interactive map of Widdelswehr
- Location within Germany Location within Lower Saxony
- Coordinates: 53.33789°N 7.26525°E
- Country: Germany
- State: Lower Saxony
- City: Emden

Population
  - Metro: 1,159
- Time zone: UTC+01:00 (CET)
  - Summer (DST): UTC+02:00 (CEST)
- Dialling codes: 04921
- Vehicle registration: 26725

Widdelswehr is a village in Lower Saxony, Germany. Together with Jarßum, it is a district (Stadtteil) of the city of Emden. It is located on the northern embankment of the Ems and to the west of Petkum. Until 1972, Widdelswehr was an independent municipality that was part of the district Leer.

The village was an East Frisian chieftain's seat in the Middle Ages. The village of was probably first mentioned in the Werden land register in the 10th century as Uuerue and certainly in the 10th to 11th centuries as Uuiggeldasgihueruia. The first part of the word developed from the proper name Wigold, the second part refers to a terp (warft; an artificial dwelling mount). This means that the place name could be translated as "warft of Wigold”.
