= Treaty of Münster (October 1648) =

Part of the Peace of Westphalia

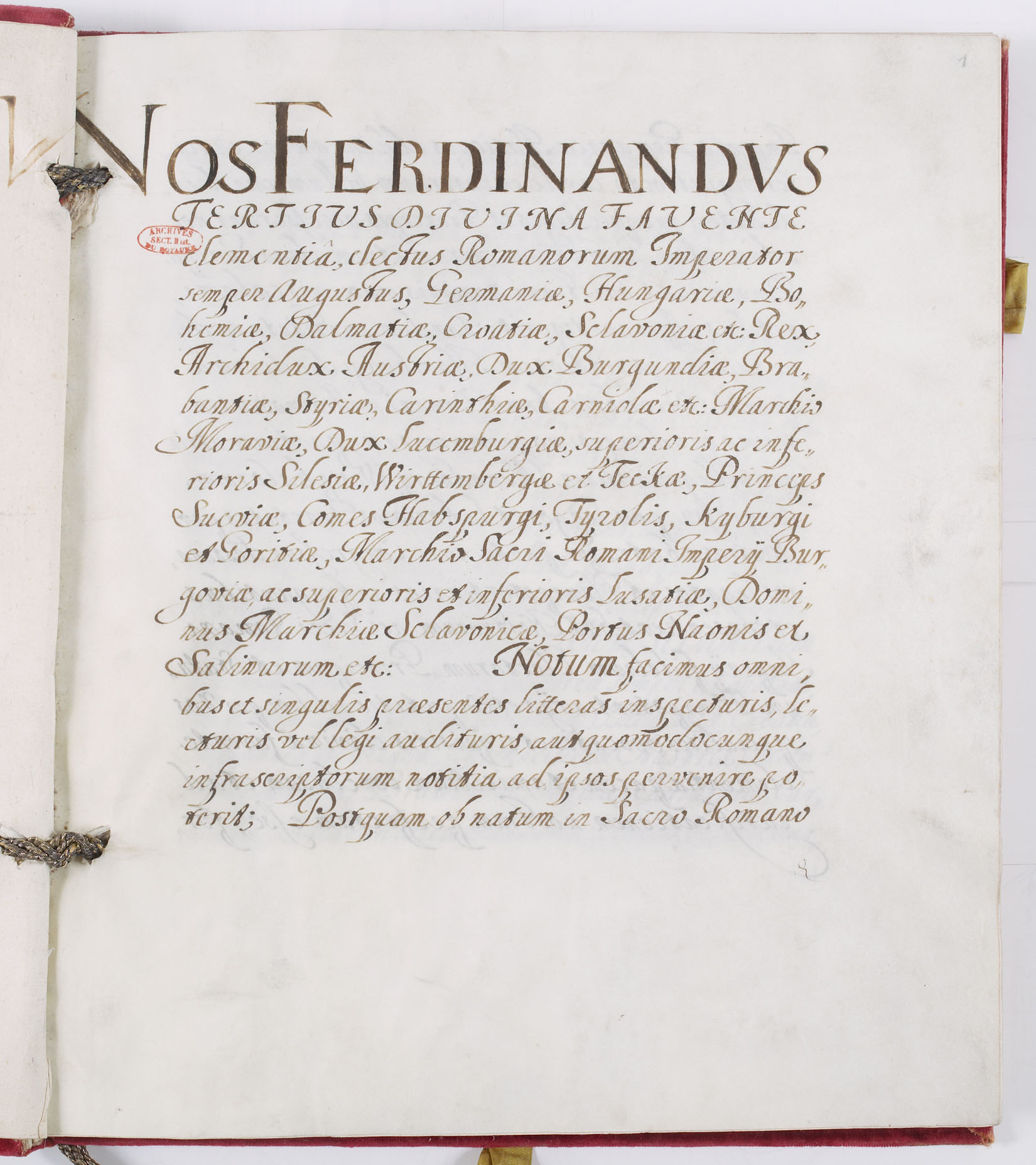
Solemn dispatch of the treaty of peace of Münster, made in Vienna by the emperor Ferdinand III, 7 November 1648. Archives Nationales. AE/I/1/11

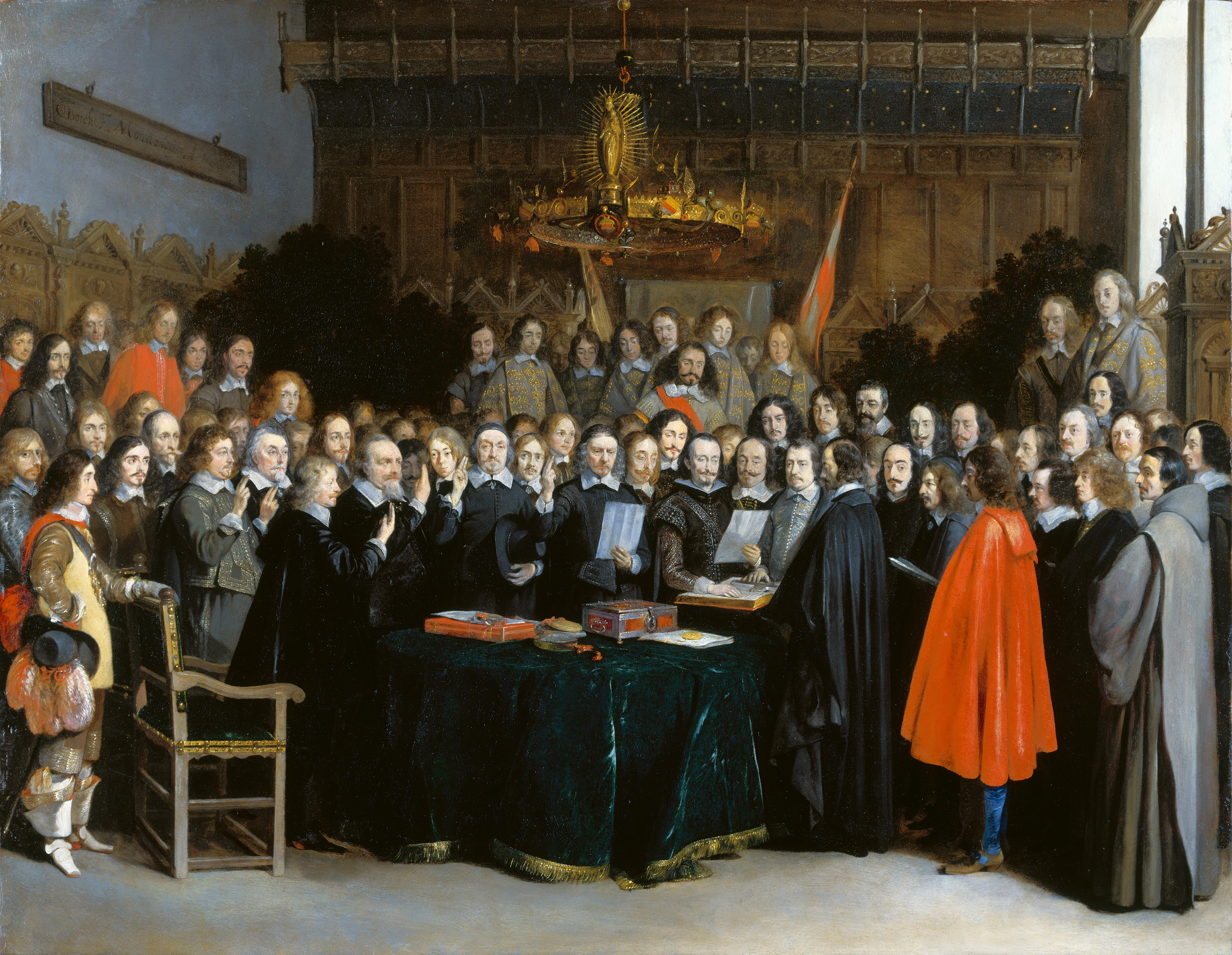
The ratification of the Treaty of Münster, part of the Peace of Westphalia that ended the Thirty Years' War

The Treaty of Münster (German: Vertrag von Münster) of 24 October 1648 was a treaty signed in Münster between, on the one hand, the Kingdom of France with regent cardinal Jules Mazarin for the underage king Louis XIV, plus his allies, and, on the other hand, Holy Roman Emperor Ferdinand III and his allies.

== Background ==
The treaty was part of the Peace of Westphalia, which ended the Thirty Years' War (1618–1648) and the Eighty Years' War (c. 1566–1648).

- Peace of Münster (30 January 1648), which ended the Eighty Years' War between the Spanish Empire and the Dutch Republic.
- Treaty of Münster (24 October 1648), which ended the war between France and the Holy Roman Empire (since 1635).
- Treaty of Osnabrück (24 October 1648), which ended the war between Sweden and the Holy Roman Empire (since 1630).

== Contents ==
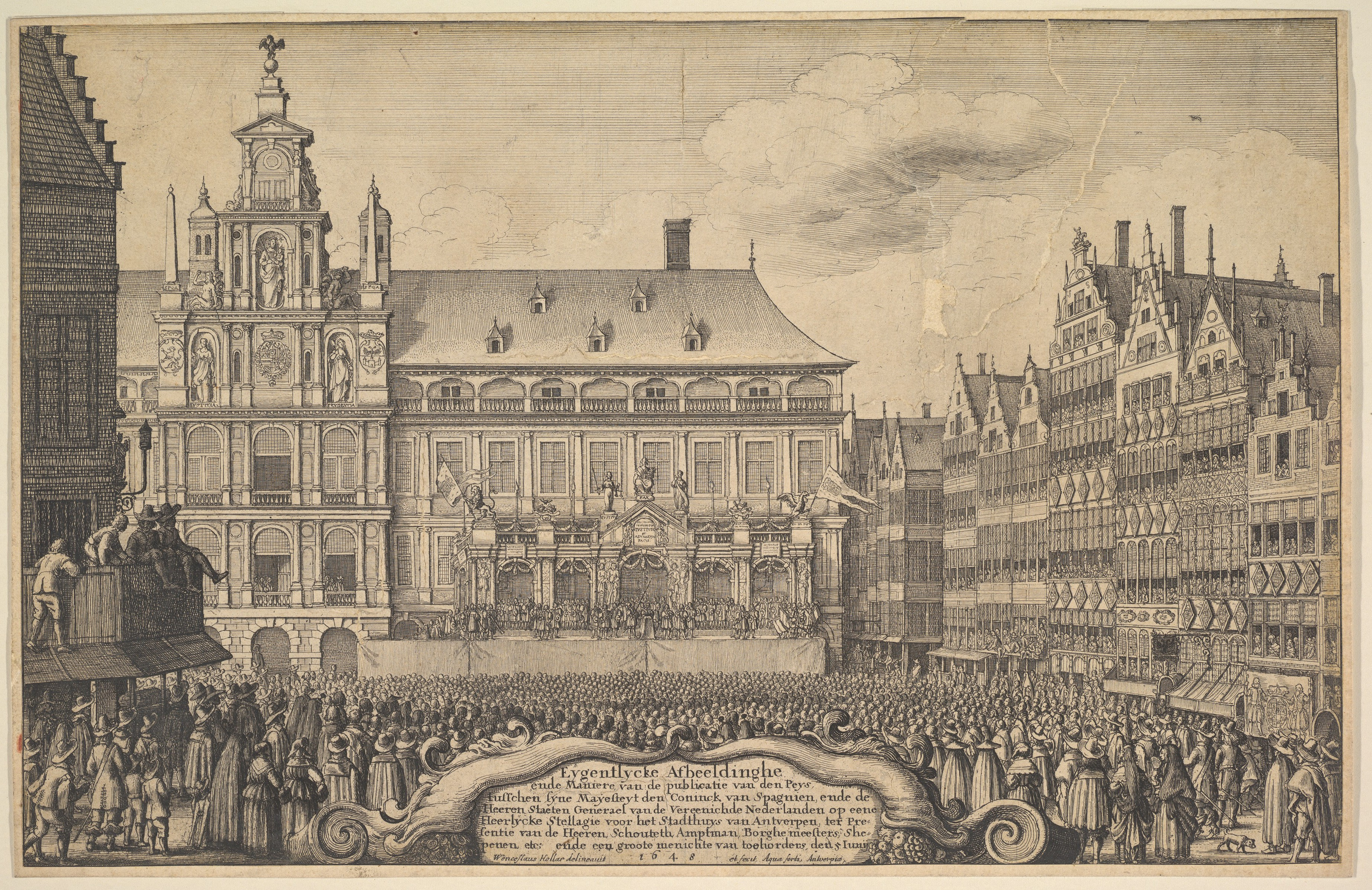
Proclamation of the treaty of Munster by Wenceslaus Hollar

The treaty consists of a main act and two annexes. The main act is the peace treaty itself. The first annex is the act of cession to the King of France of the Three Bishoprics, Alsace, Brisach and Pignerol; the second is the act of cession of Alsace to the King of France.

This treaty took a long time to materialise. Indeed, the negotiations started on 25 December 1641, but the signatures were not formalised until seven years later. This delay was due to some delicate issues – including the structure of the Empire – on which the authorities did not agree.

== Bibliography ==
- Duparc, Pierre (1948). "Les actes du traité de Münster de 1648 entre la France et l'Empire" (fac-similé). Bibliothèque de l'École des Chartes (in French). 107 (1): 52–61. doi:10.3406/bec.1948.449379.
