= University of Dole =

University based in Dole founded in the 15th century

Coat of arms of the University of Dole

The University of Dole was founded in 1423 by Philip the Good of Burgundy at Dole in the Free County of Burgundy (then a principality of the Holy Roman Empire, but now in France). It became a leading university in western Europe, historically notable for its teaching of canon and civil law.

== History ==
From its foundation the university was student run, on the Bologna model, but in 1613 the college of professors sent a formal deputy to the archdukes in Brussels, seeking to convert the University to a Magisteruniversität such as Louvain and Douai. The archdukes issued edicts (1616-1618) with that intent, but the students would not have it, overtly repudiated the edicts, and boycotted the university. It is probable that the edicts were never enforced.

In 1691 Louis XIV, who had conquered the region in 1678, moved the university from Dole to Besançon where its successor is now known as the University of Franche-Comté.

== Notable faculty ==
- Henry Cornelius Agrippa von Nettesheim - lectured on Johann Reuchlin's De verbo mirifico (1509)

== Notable alumni ==
- Wigle Aytta van Zwichem (1507-1577) – Dutch statesman and jurist, received his doctorate from Dole in 1526
- Otto von Truchsess von Waldburg (1514-1573) – Prince-Bishop of Augsburg
- Claude de La Baume (1534-1584) – cardinal and Archbishop of Besançon
- Balthazar Gerards (1557-1584) – assassin of William the Silent
- Jean-Baptiste Besard (1567-1625?) – Lawyer, Doctor of Medicine and Composer for the Lute
- Antoine Brun (1599-1654) – diplomat
- Jean-Bernard Knepper – Burgomeister of Luxemburg City 1693-1698

== See also ==
- List of medieval universities
