= Petkum =

- District of Emden
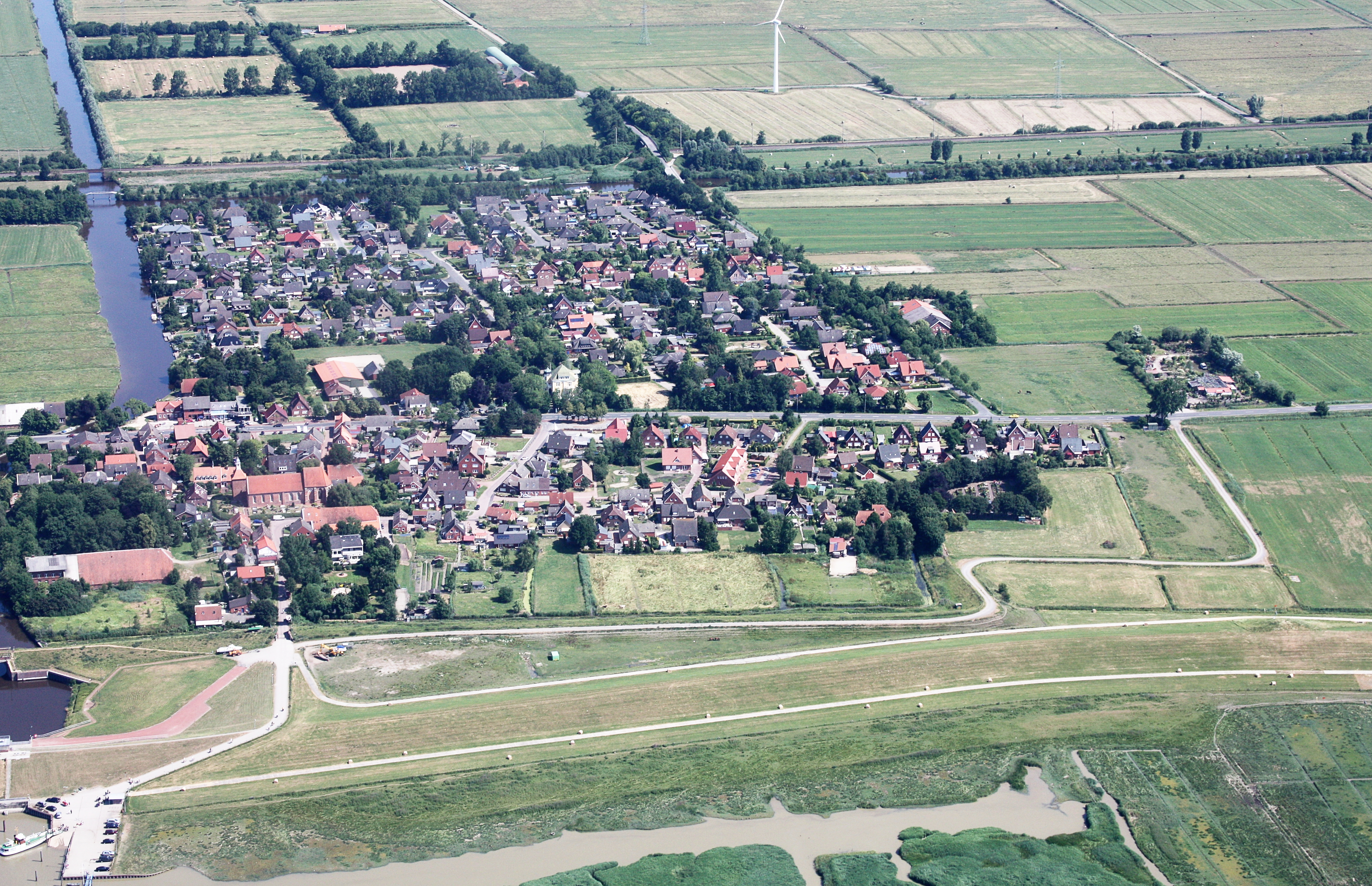
- Aerial view of Petkum

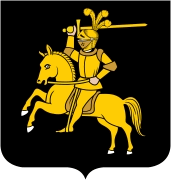
- Coat of arms

- Location of Petkum within Emden
- Interactive map of Petkum
- Location within Germany Location within Lower Saxony
- Coordinates: 53.33593°N 7.27539°E
- Country: Germany
- State: Lower Saxony
- City: Emden
- Elevation: 1 m (3.3 ft)

Population
  - Metro: 1,043
- Time zone: UTC+01:00 (CET)
  - Summer (DST): UTC+02:00 (CEST)
- Dialling codes: 04921
- Vehicle registration: 26725

Petkum (East Frisian Low Saxon: Petjem) is the easternmost district (Stadtteil) of the German city of Emden, in Lower Saxony. It is located to the east of Widdelswehr. Until 1972 it was part of the Leer district, since then it has been administratively part of the city of Emden.

The small East Frisian village, the oldest center located on a warft on the Eems, has a long history: in 2006 Petkum celebrated the 1200th anniversary of the village. The St. Antonius Church in the village was built in the thirteenth century. The village is connected by ferry to Ditzum on the other side of the river.

The former Herrlichkeit of Petkum with its own administration and jurisdiction was first mentioned in the 10th century as Pettinghem. In 1364 the place was also recorded as Pectium. Today's spelling has been documented since 1369. The settlement's name can probably be translated as "dwelling of the people of Patjo" or "dwelling of the people of Bado".

A branch of the prominent Ripperda family originated from Petkum.

== Gallery ==
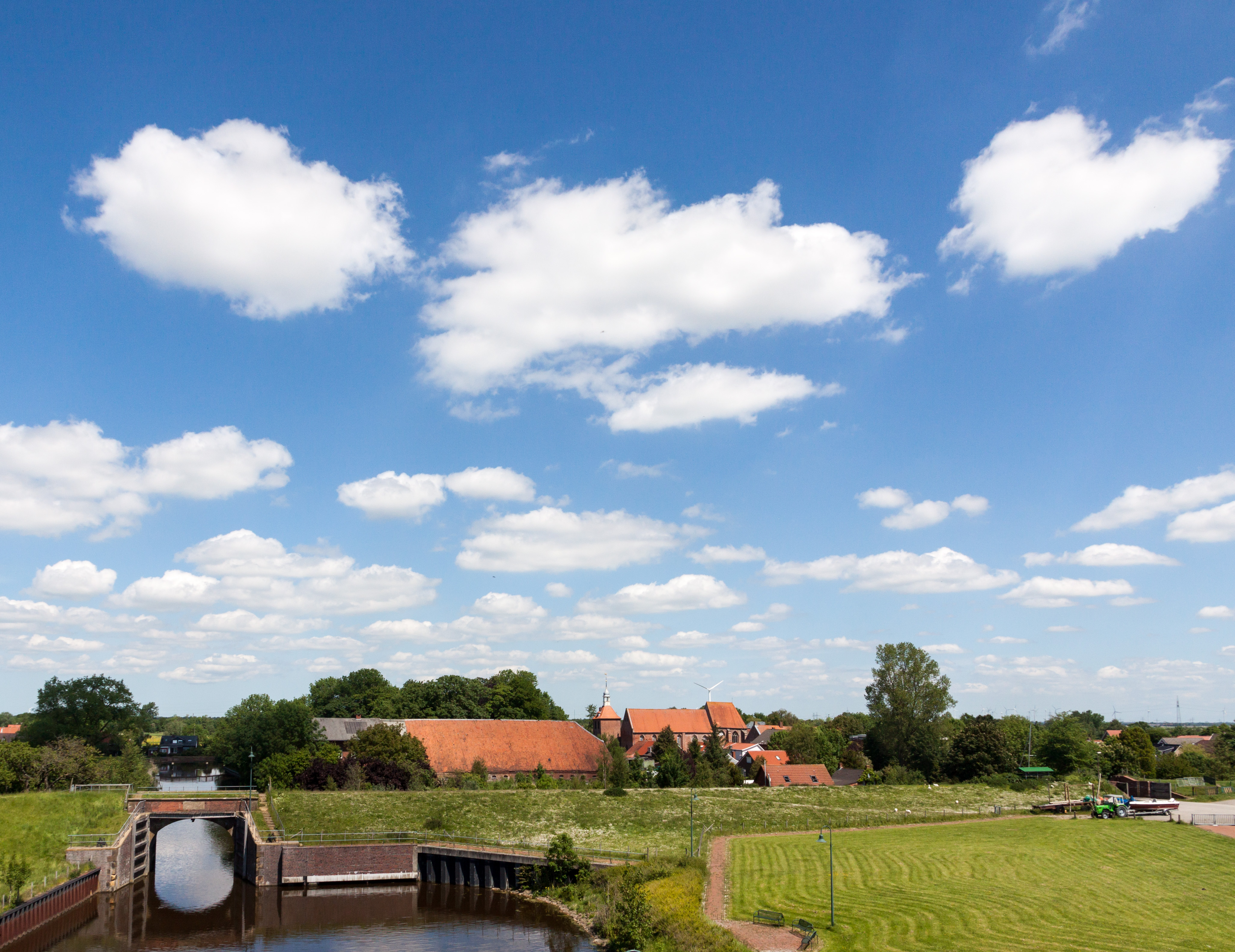
View of Petkum

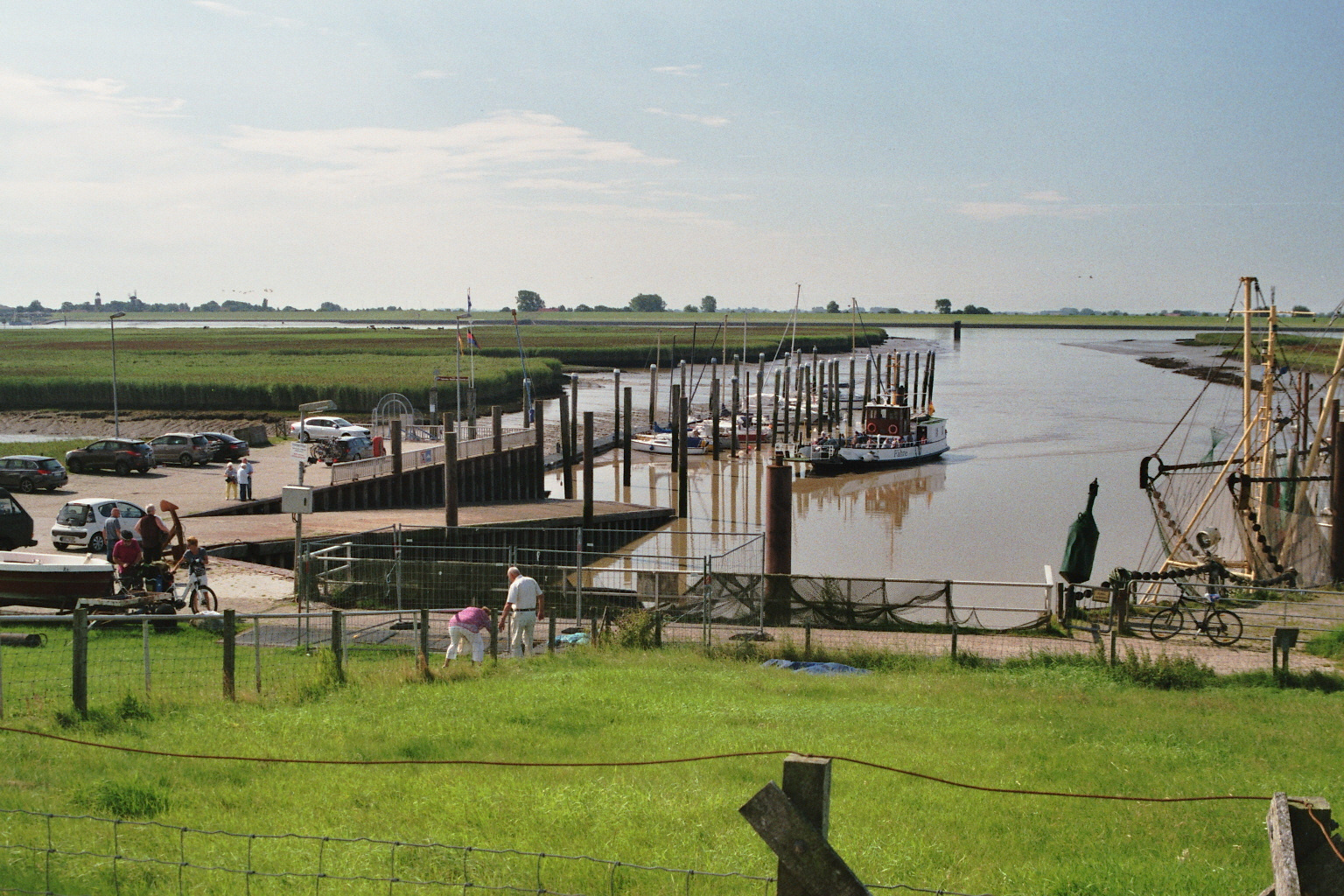
Petkum harbour

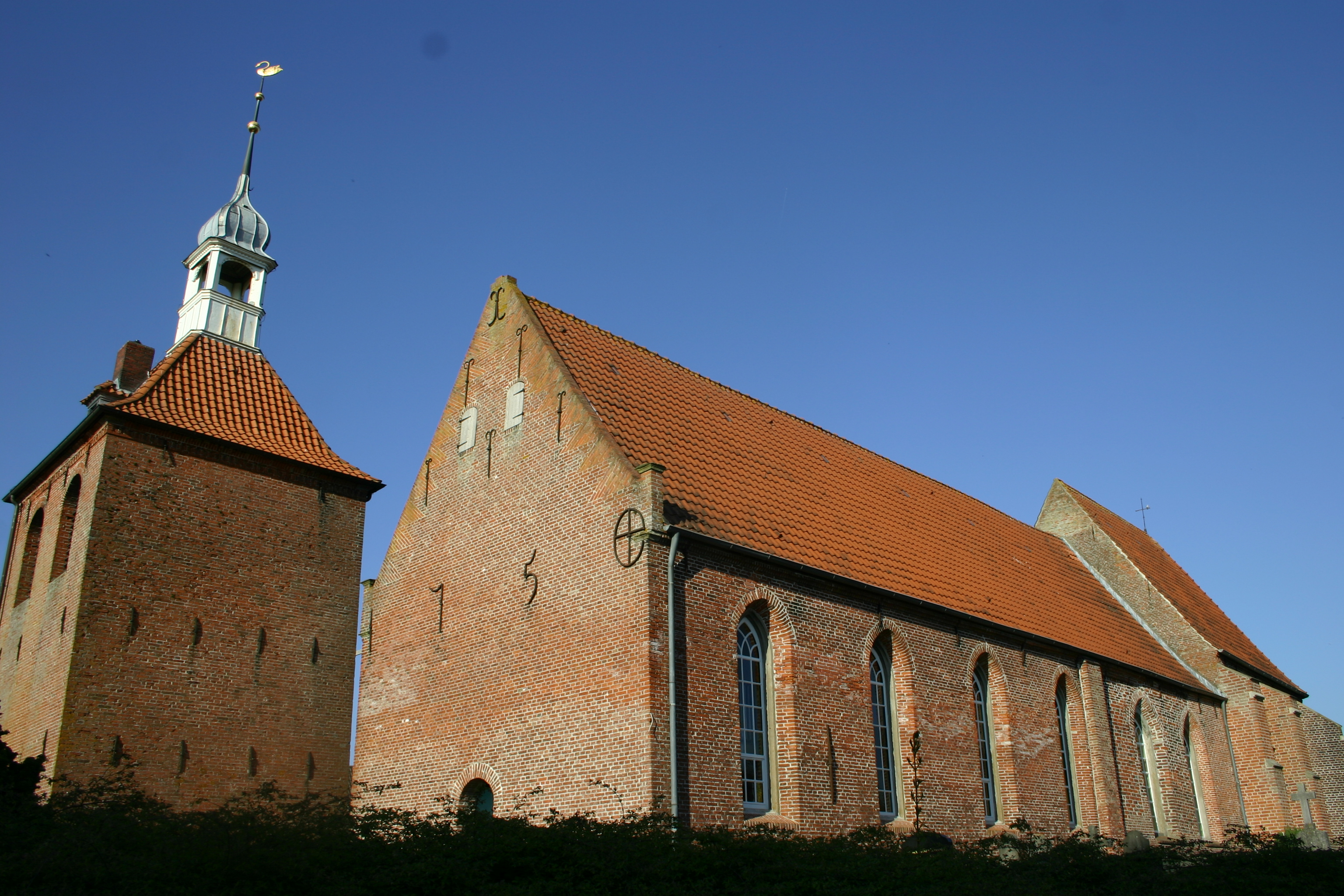
St. Antonius Church
