= Ripperda =

- noble family
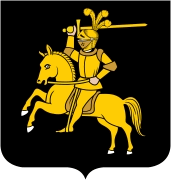
- Country: Netherlands
- Founded: 14th century
- Titles: Baron; Duke
- Estates: Castle Vorden; Castle Weldam; Castle Ellerburg; Castle Boxbergen; Castle Petkum; Castle Hengelo
- Cadet branches: Ripperda tot Farmsum; Ripperda tot Winsum; Ripperda tot Oosterwijtwert; Ripperda tot Peize; Ripperda tot Beurse; Ripperda tot Boxbergen; Ripperda tot Weldam; Ripperda tot Vorden von Ripperda zu Venhaus von Ripperda-Ellerburg von Ripperda zu Petkum von Ripperda-Cosyn de Ripperda

The Ripperda family is an old and prominent family that belonged to the German, Austrian, Spanish and Dutch nobility. Members of this family have played a major role in European history as soldiers, politicians and diplomats.

== Origins ==
The origins of the name are not completely clear but the family seems to originate from East Frisia, settling in the north-eastern part of the Netherlands (de Ommelanden), the current province of Groningen, in the 13th century. The name Ripperda is a patronymic variation of the Old Germanic and Frisian name Ripperd (Ripert or Rupert). In fact, it is generally believed that the family is descended from Ripertus de Nothemsum, chieftain in Holwierde around 1267.

== Barons ==
In 1474, Frederick III, Holy Roman Emperor conferred upon Unico II Ripperda and all his descendants the title of baron with Imperial immediacy (“Reichsunmittelbarer Häuptling und Freiherr”) and the right to issue coins ("muntrecht"). On 3 September 1676, Leopold I, Holy Roman Emperor recognised this nobility diploma and confirmed the title of baron ("Reichsfreiherr") for all members of the house of Ripperda.

From the 11th century, members of this family had ruled as local chiefs in the provinces of Groningen and East Frisia. Later, they also belonged to the local nobility of Drenthe, Overijssel, Zutphen, Münster and Minden, among others. Their influence and wealth continued to increase throughout The Netherlands and Westphalia with the help of advantageous marriages and alliances. At their zenith, in the 17th and 18th centuries, the Ripperdas were among the most powerful and wealthiest nobles in the region. As such, they are closely related to a number of other prominent noble families.

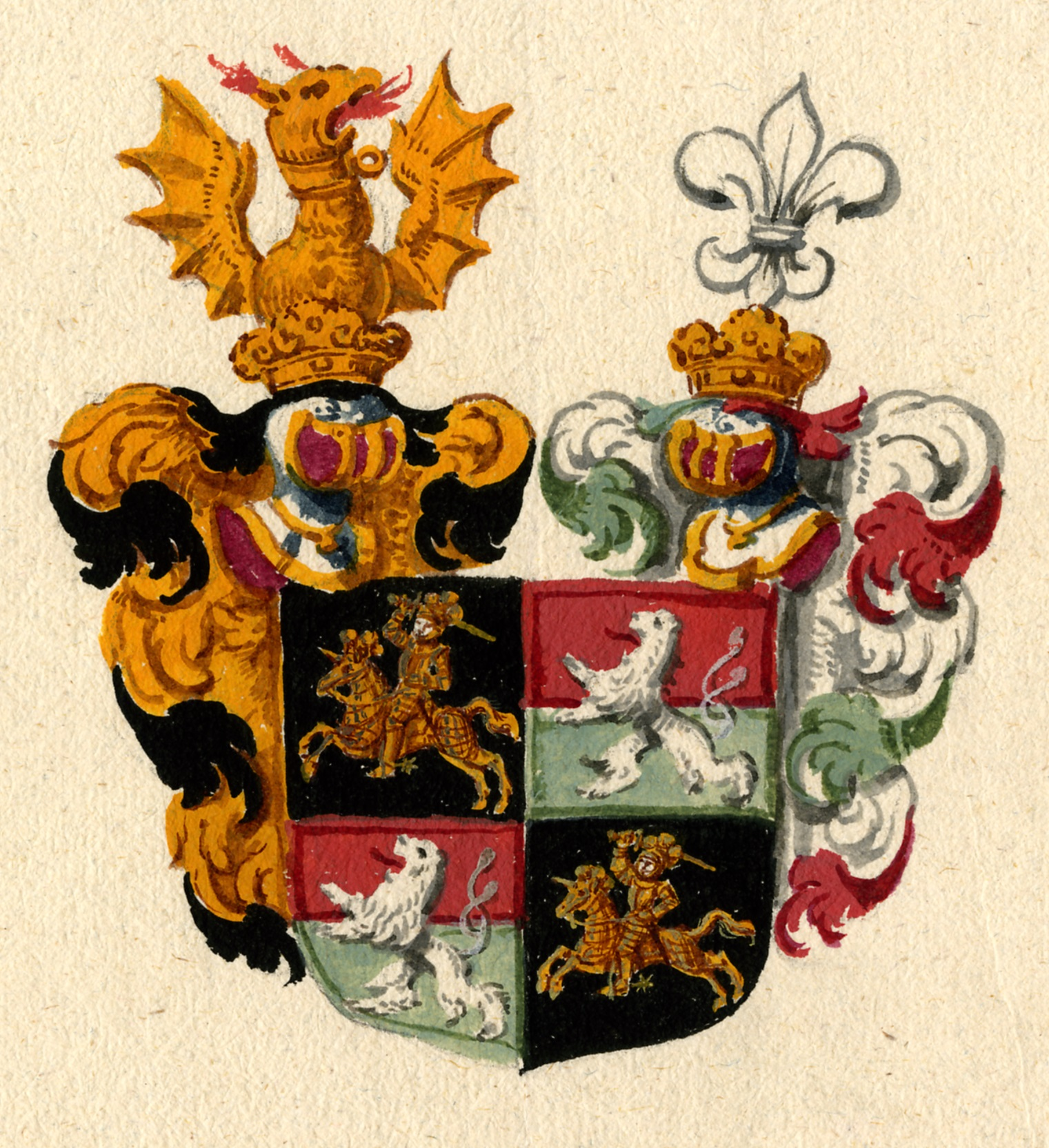
Coat-of-Arms von Ripperda-Petkum

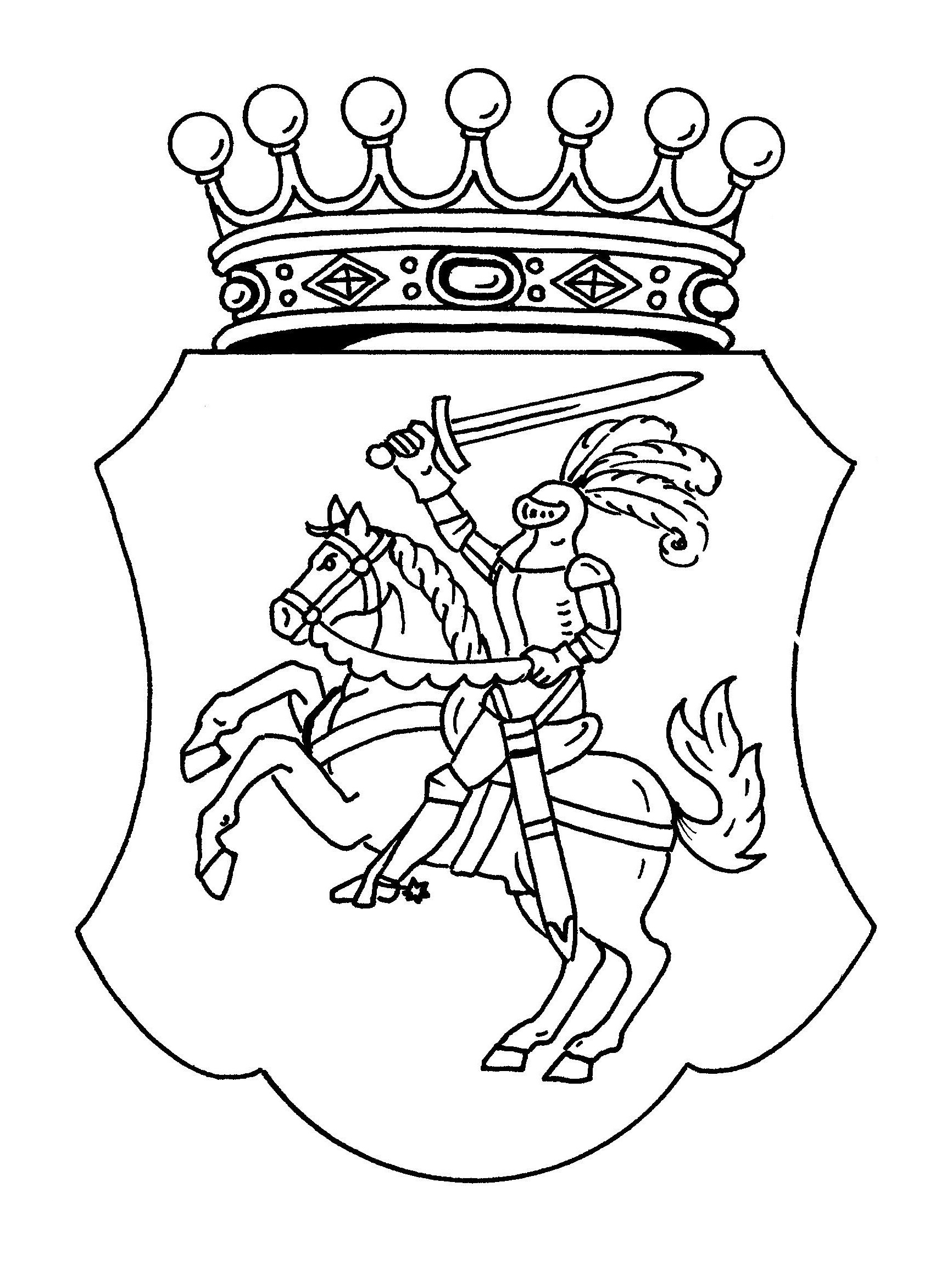
Coat-of-Arms House of Ripperda

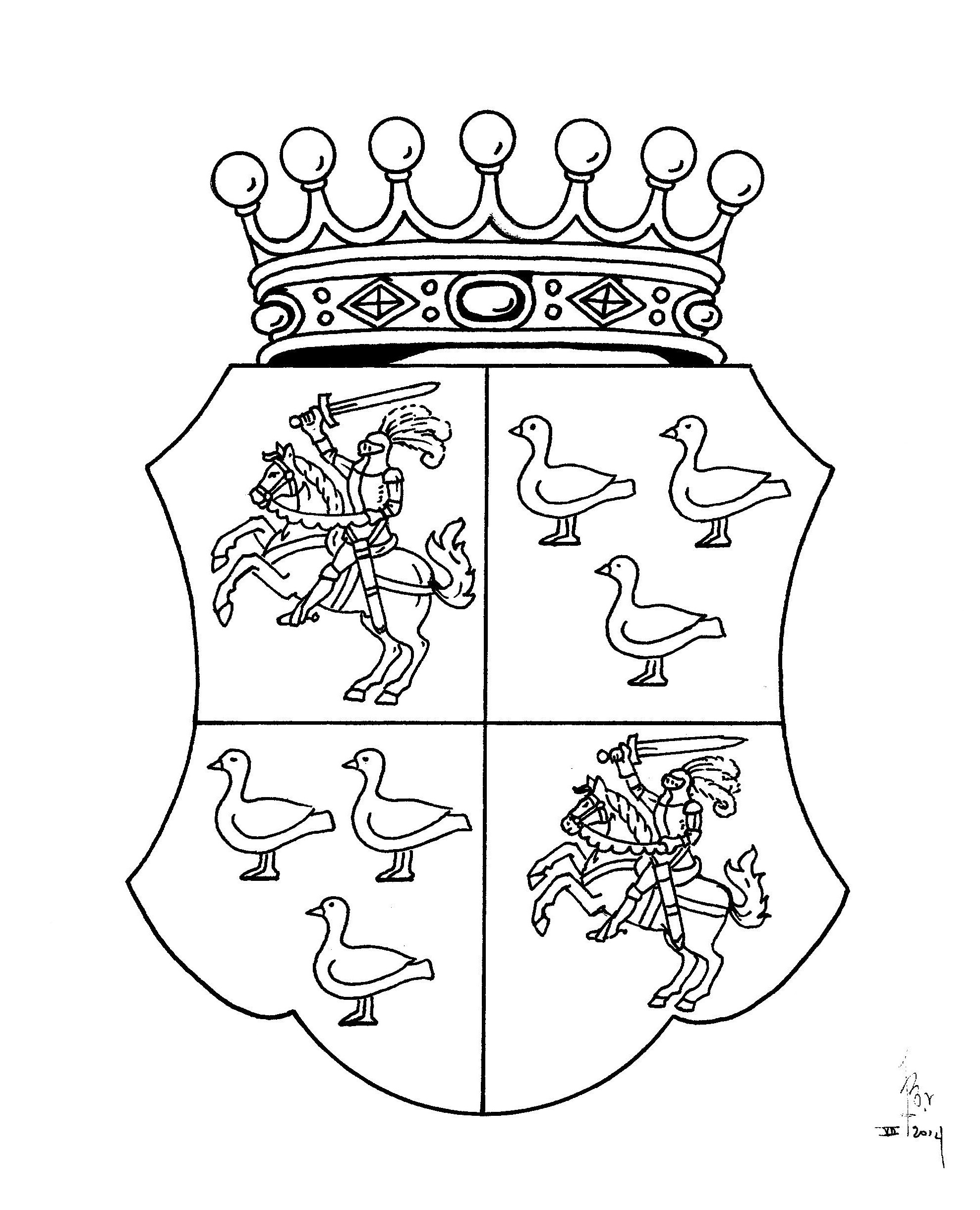
Coat-of-Arms von Ripperda-Cosyn

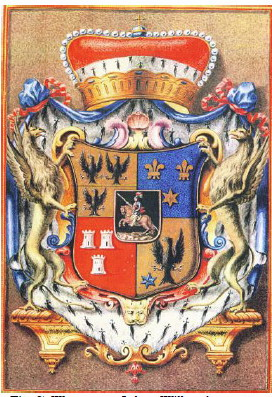
Coat-of-Arms of the Duke de Ripperda

== Ripperdas today ==
The Dutch branches of Ripperda-Farmsum, -Oosterwijtwerd, -Winsum, -Vorden and -Weldam had all died out by the late 18th century. The German branch of Ripperda-Petkum died out in 1739; the Spanish branch De Ripperdá in 1873, the Austrian branch of Ripperda-Boxbergen in 1920; and the German branch of Ripperda-Ellerburg shortly after World War II. Today, two Danish members of the branch of Ripperda-Ellerburg (a.k.a. "de Ripperda") survive in Copenhagen, and five of the Dutch-German branch, von Ripperda-Cosyn, in London and Paris.

In addition, numerous descendants of an illegitimate son of John Willem Ripperda (listed below) exist in Lingen (Germany) and the United States. However, the latter have never belonged to the nobility and are not formally recognised by the family.

== Famous scions ==
- John William, Baron Ripperda.
- Wigbolt Ripperda.
- Juan María Vicencio de Ripperdá.
- Willem Ripperda.

== Sources ==
- "Genealogie van het Geslacht Ripperda" by mr. C.P.L. Rutgers (1902).
- "Genealogie van het Geslacht Ripperda" by Pieter van Agteren (2014).
- "Het Geslacht Ripperda" by R.S. Roorda (1954).
- "Genealogie über 16 Generationen des Reichsfreiherrlichen Geschlechtes von Ripperda" by Udo Reichsfreiherr von Ripperda (Königsberg, 1934).
- "Huisarchief van Farmsum" in the archives of the Hoge Raad van Adel (High Council for Nobility), The Hague.
- "Johan Willem Ripperda – De man die geen koning werd van Corsica" by Sytze van der Veen (2007).
- Von Ripperda family-archive.
- "Gothäisches Genealogisches Taschenbuch der Freiherrlichen Hauser" (1894, 1904, 1942)
- "Genealogisches Handbuch des Adels - Band 122, Adelslexikon XI Pre-Rok" (2000)
- "Portraits of the House of Ripperda - A Catalogue" by Charles F. Ponsonby (2016)
