= Jarßum =

- District of Emden
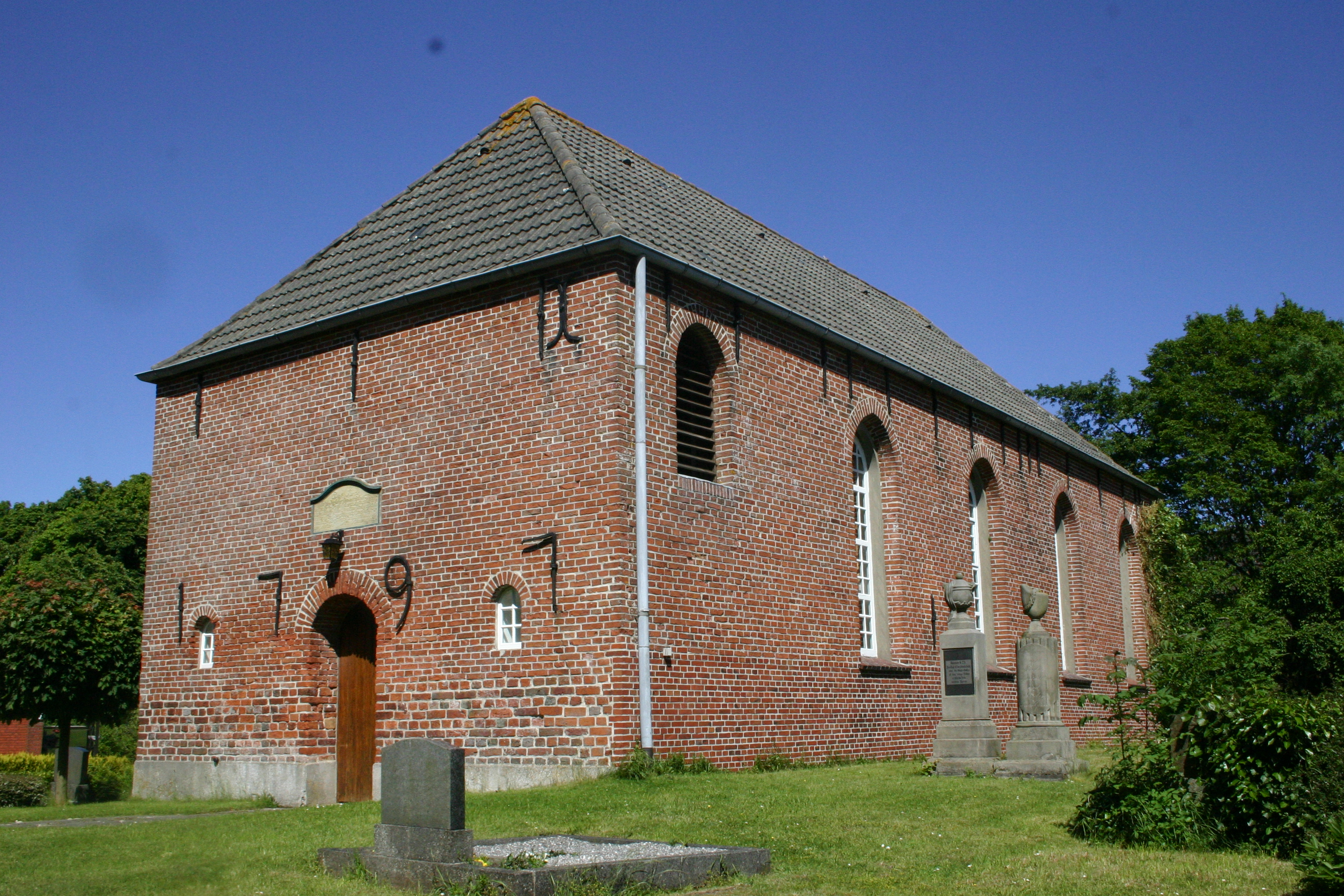
- Church of Jarßum

- Location of Widdelswehr-Jarßum within Emden
- Interactive map of Jarßum
- Location within Germany Location within Lower Saxony
- Coordinates: 53.33835°N 7.25188°E
- Country: Germany
- State: Lower Saxony
- City: Emden

Population
  - Metro: 1,159
- Time zone: UTC+01:00 (CET)
  - Summer (DST): UTC+02:00 (CEST)
- Dialling codes: 04921
- Vehicle registration: 26725

Jarßum or Jarssum is a village in Lower Saxony, Germany. Together with Widdelswehr, it is a district (Stadtteil) of the city of Emden. It is located on the northern embankment of the Ems.

In the land records of the monastery of Werden, Jarßum is listed as Gerzhem in the 10th century. The name Jarßum means 'house of a distinguished man' named Jarrich or Gerrad. Variations of the name are Jarsum or Jarrsum. Today both the spelling with ß and ss are used.

The village has a church from 1797. This replaced an older church from the fourteenth century.
