= Antoine Brun =

Burgundian diplomat (1599–1654)

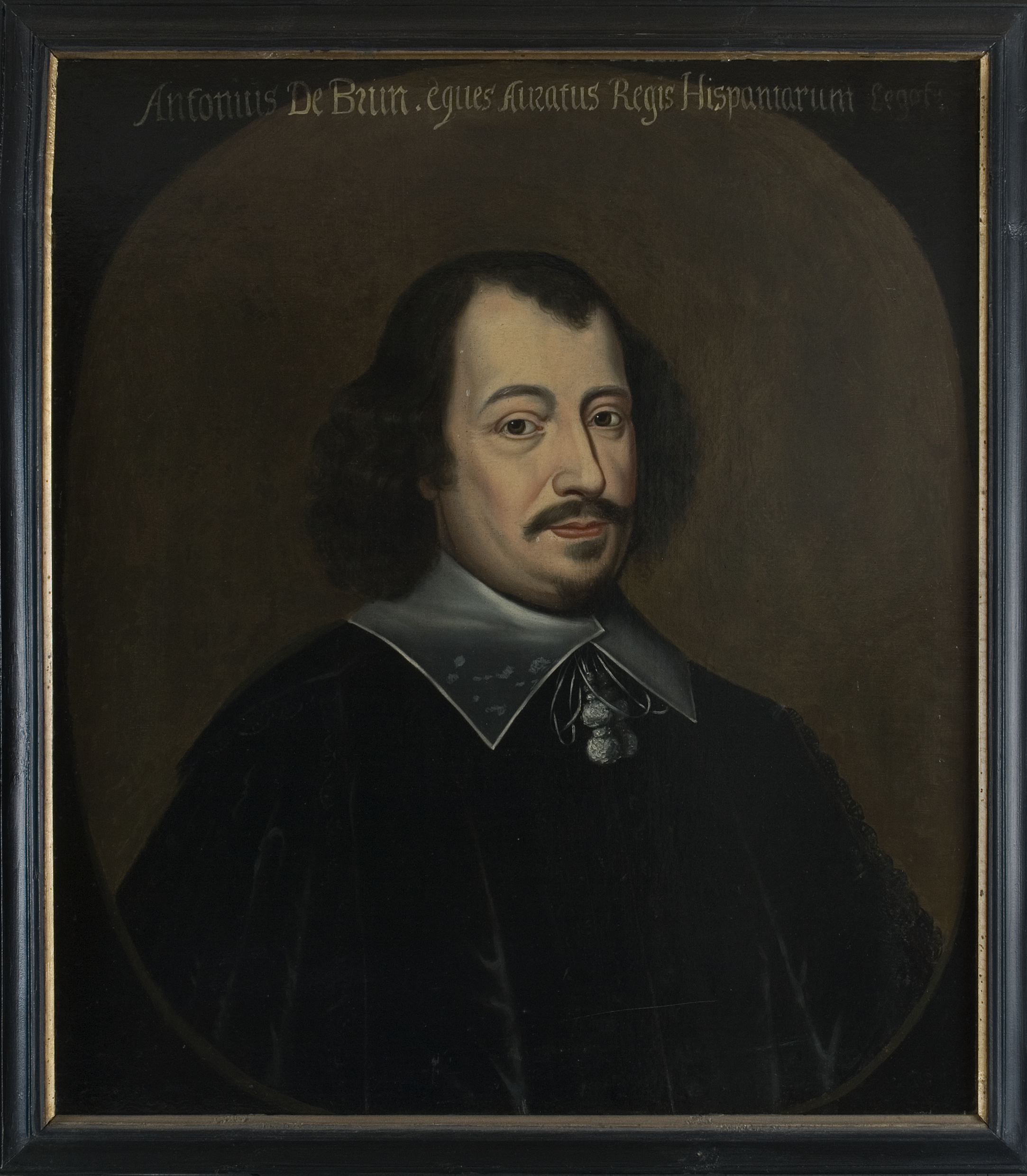
- Antoine de Brun, 1600-1654

ambassador
- Monarch: Philip IV of Spain

Personal details
- Born: 29 June 1599 Dole, Franche-Comté
- Died: 2 January 1654 (aged 54)
- Education: University of Dole (civil law)

Anthoine Brun (1599–1654), baron d'Aspremont, was a Burgundian (Franche-Comté) diplomat in the service of Philip IV of Spain.

== Life ==
Brun was born on 29 June 1599, the son of Claude Brun, advocate in the Parlement of Dole. He studied law at the universities of Dole and Bourges. In 1632 he was appointed procurator general of the Parlement of Dole. He was a leading figure in organising resistance to the French invasion of Franche-Comté in 1636.

Brun was appointed to the Supreme Council of Flanders in 1642. As a representative of the king of Spain, he played an important role in the negotiations leading to the Peace of Münster (1648).

Thereafter he became the king's first resident ambassador in the newly recognised Dutch Republic. He took up residence in The Hague in mid-1649, his first official despatch as ambassador being dated 29 June 1649. In 1650 he concluded a naval treaty with the Dutch on behalf of the king.

He was also a man of letters, publishing a French translation of a selection of the letters of Justus Lipsius: Le Chois des Epistres de Lipse (1650).

He died 2 January 1654.

== Publications ==
- Le Manifeste d'Antoine Brun (1638), edited by Emile Longin (Vesoul, 1905).
- Le Chois des Epistres de Lipse, translated by Antoine Brun (Lyon, 1650).

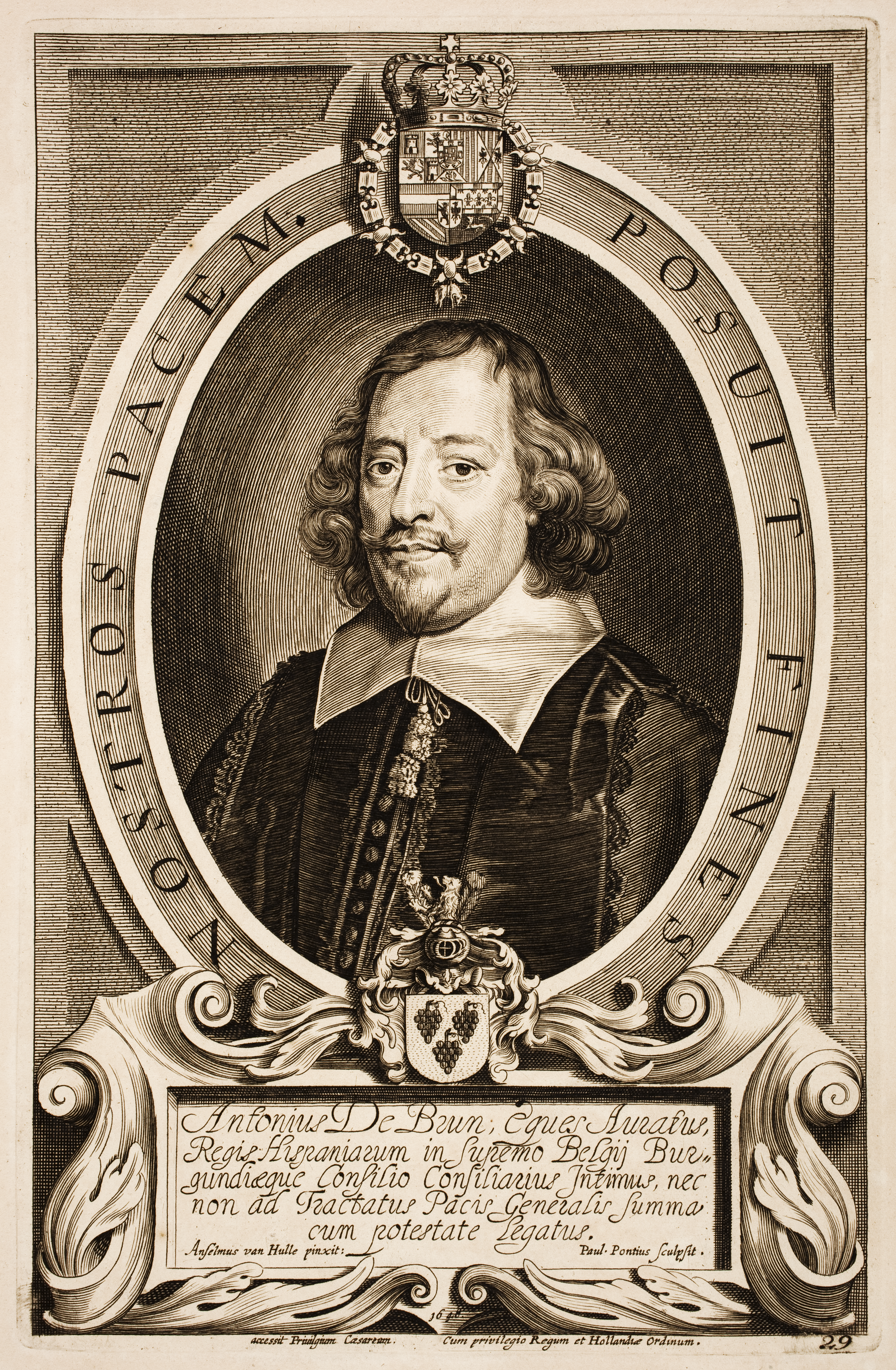
Engraved portrait of Antoine Brun
