= Willem Ripperda =

Dutch nobleman and diplomat

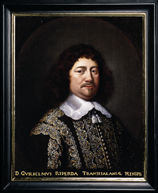
Willem, Baron Ripperda

Willem, Baron Ripperda, Lord of Hengelo, Boekelo, Boxbergen, Rijsenburg and Solmsburg (Twente, 1600 – Hengelo, 1669), was an ambassador at the peace conferences of Osnabrück and Münster which ended both the Thirty Years' War in Germany and the Eighty Years' War between Spain and the Netherlands.

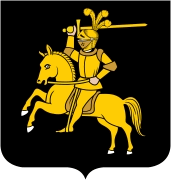
Coat of arms of the Ripperda family

Willem was the son of Baron Unico Ripperda van Boxbergen, drost of Twente, and Anna van Doetinchem. The old, noble House of Ripperda originally came from Groningen. In 1627 he married Aleyd van den Bouchorst tot Wimmenum.

Willem Ripperda left his military career in 1623. In 1631 he was elected to represent the Province of Overijssel at the States-General of the Netherlands in The Hague. He was a loyal supporter of the Prince of Orange and was sent to the peace negotiations in Osnabrück and Münster in 1644. These resulted in the signing of the Peace of Westphalia.

== Sources ==
- Genealogie van het Geslacht Ripperda von mr. C.P.L. Rutgers (1902)
- Genealogie van het Geslacht Ripperda von P.W.G. van Agteren (2014))
- Genealogie über 16 Generationen des Reichsfreiherrlichen Geschlechtes von Ripperda von Udo Reichsfreiherr v. Ripperda (Koningsbergen, 1934)
- Dutch Culture in a European Perspective, Willem Frijhoff, Marijke Spies, Published by Uitgeverij Van Gorcum, 2004, ISBN 90-232-3963-6, ISBN 978-90-232-3963-5
